= 2015 Palarong Pambansa =

Multi-sports competition

58th Palarong Pambansa
- Logo of the 2015 Palarong Pambansa
- Host city: Tagum, Davao del Norte (main)
- Country: Philippines
- Motto: Sports: Breaking Borders, Building Peace
- Teams: 17 regional athletic associations
- Athletes: 12,000+
- Events: 17 regular games 5 demonstration games 4 special games
- Opening: 04 May
- Closing: 09 May
- Opened by: Secretary of Education; Bro. Armin Luistro, FSC
- Athlete's Oath: Harrison Cerillo
- Judge's Oath: Cesar Abalon
- Torch lighter: Kyla Cielo Bernaldez
- Main venue: Davao del Norte Sports and Tourism Complex
- Broadcast partners: ABS-CBN, Sky Cable, Rappler
- Ceremony venue: Davao del Norte Sports and Tourism Complex
- Website: davnorpalaro2015.com

The 2015 Palarong Pambansa was the 58th edition of the annual multi-sporting event for Filipino student-athletes. The games were held in Tagum, Davao del Norte from 3 to 9 May 2015. This is the first hosting of the Province of Davao del Norte, 60 years after it hosted the Palarong Pambansa as part of the larger Davao province. Tagum hosts most of the venues and billeting centers while the municipalities of Carmen, Sto. Tomas, New Corella, and Kapalong, and the cities of Panabo and Samal Island provided additional billeting centers and venues for the delegates. The events were mostly held within the Davao del Norte Sports and Tourism Complex, including the opening and closing ceremonies.

A total of 26 sports disciplines were contested during the Palaro, 17 of them as regular games, 5 as demonstration games, and 4 as special games for athletes with special needs. For the first time, beach volleyball was played as a demonstration sport.

The Provincial Government of Davao del Norte spent three years preparing what they promised to be "the best Palaro ever." This included the construction of a redesigned Davao del Norte Sports and Tourism Complex according to international standards.

The opening ceremony was on the second day of the games on 4 May while the closing ceremony was held on 9 May.

The National Capital Regional Athletic Association bagged its 11th straight championship title after seven days of sports competitions.

== Bidding ==
After Luzon and Visayas have hosted the two previous Palarong Pambansa competitions in Laguna and Negros Oriental respectively, the next host province for the 2015 games will now come from the island of Mindanao, according to the Palarong Pambansa Law. At least five bids were made for the 2015 Palarong Pambansa: Koronadal, South Cotabato (which hosted the 1996 and 2007 Palaro), Tagum, Davao del Norte (its first time), Tubod, Lanao del Norte (which hosted the 2003 Palaro) and Dipolog, Zamboanga del Norte (which hosted the 1982 Palaro) made their bids for the games. Surigao del Norte and Butuan also made a joint bid together to host the games; Agusan del Norte was initially part of the joint bid of Surigao del Norte and Butuan. Cagayan de Oro, where the 1988 Palaro was held, also expressed interest to bid for the games but was not included in the final vote for the host.

The Department of Education's Management Committee held a vote at the DepEd Central Office in Pasig, Metro Manila on December 15, 2014 to determine the 2015 hosts. Tagum, Davao del Norte won the bid, receiving a majority vote of 16 out of 18. Provincial Governor Rodolfo P. Del Rosario celebrated the result by assuring the organizers that "we will give them the best Palaro and that will be our battlecry: the best Palaro ever."

2015 Palarong Pambansa bids
City	Province	Region
Cagayan de Oro^{1}	Misamis Oriental	Region X or Northern Mindanao
Dipolog	Zamboanga del Norte	Region IX or Zamboanga Peninsula
Koronadal	South Cotabato	Region XII or Soccsksargen
Surigao; Butuan	Surigao del Norte; Agusan del Norte^{2}	Region XIII or Caraga
Tagum	Davao del Norte	Region XI or Davao Region
Tubod	Lanao del Norte	Region X or Northern Mindanao

Winning bid
^{1} – was not included in the final bidding
^{2} – was initially included in the joint bid of Surigao del Norte and Butuan

== Marketing ==
=== Logo and branding ===
The logo and theme for the 2015 Palarong Pambansa was unanimously approved and unveiled by the organizing committee on 27 January 2015. The official logo of the 2015 Palarong Pambansa is inspired from the games' theme "Sports: Breaking Borders, Building Peace."

The primary element of the logo is a stylized dove which signifies peace, carrying with it an olive branch with 17 leaves representing the 17 regions of the Philippines. Three flaming tails emerge from the dove which stand for the diversity of the tri-peoples (Lumads or indigenous people, Muslims, and Christians) who participate in the Palarong Pambansa. It is emblazoned with an elaborate okir motif (a traditional artistic motif used by the Islamic tribes), a fish (standing for Christianity), and beadworks of the lumads. The dove also has the outline of the letter P, the first letter of the words "Palarong Pambansa," and the colors of the dove are taken from the Philippine flag.

Below the dove is a banana leaf with the words "Davao del Norte," which represents the chief agricultural produce of the province which is the banana; due to this, Davao del Norte is nicknamed as the "Banana Capital of the Philippines." According to Davao del Norte Governor Rodolfo P. Del Rosario, the banana leaf also embodies the resilience of the Dabaonon people, who constantly emerge stronger and better from natural calamities, "just like the ever-enduring banana plant."

=== Music ===
The official theme song for the 2015 Palarong Pambansa is entitled Palaro ng Pagkakaisa (The Games of Unity), written and composed by Davao-based songwriter and singer Maan Chua, and arranged by Paolo Sisi. The music video for the song was directed by Willie Apa Jr., and featured the DNSTC and several tourist destinations within Davao del Norte, including Samal Island, Talaingod, Christ the King Cathedral in Tagum (the largest Catholic cathedral in the region and houses the largest wooden rosary in the world), and the New City Hall of Tagum. The music video features the national promoters for the games, namely 15-time Southeast Asian Games gold medalist in athletics Elma Muros, two-time Olympian in swimming Eric Buhain, and former Azkals player Yannick Tuason, alongside their respective younger counterparts: Mariafe Basong, a runner from the indigenous tribes of Talaingod, Davao del Norte, Roger Porton Jr., a swimmer from Samal Island, and Kier James Macaren, a football player from Davao City.

=== TV and Radio Advertisements ===
The first TV teaser was shown to the public on 1 March 2015, a one-minute and twenty second TV advertisement with several aerial shots of the DNSTC and archived video footage from previous Palaro games, alongside a forty-second radio advertisement. A month before the games, the official thirty-second TV ad was shown by the media sponsors and through the 2015 Palarong Pambansa website. It features the promoters (Muros, Buhain, and Tuazon) together with their counterparts, similar to that with the music video; this TV advertisement was also directed by Willie Apa Jr.

== Participating regions ==
The 2015 Palarong Pambansa sees all 17 regions of the Philippines participate in the games.

Host Region

Regions			No. of Participants		
Code	Regional Athletic Association Name	Region	Athletes	Officials	Total
ARMMAA	Autonomous Region in Muslim Mindanao Athletic Association	Autonomous Region in Muslim Mindanao			
CARAA	Cordillera Administrative Region Athletic Association	Cordillera Administrative Region			
NCRAA	National Capital Region Athletic Association	National Capital Region			
RIAA	Region I Athletic Association	Region I or Ilocos Region			
CaVRAA	Cagayan Valley Regional Athletic Association	Region II or Cagayan Valley			
CLRAA	Central Luzon Regional Athletic Association	Region III or Central Luzon			
STCAA	Southern Tagalog - Calabarzon Athletic Association	Region IV-A or Southern Tagalog – Calabarzon			
MRAA	Mimaropa Regional Athletic Association	Region IV-B or Southern Tagalog – Mimaropa			
BRAA	Bicol Regional Athletic Association	Region V or Bicol Region			
WVRAA	Western Visayas Regional Athletic Association	Region VI or Western Visayas			
CVRAA	Central Visayas Regional Athletic Association	Region VII Central Visayas			
EVRAA	Eastern Visayas Regional Athletic Association	Region VIII or Eastern Visayas			
ZPRAA	Zamboanga Peninsula Regional Athletic Association	Region IX or Zamboanga Peninsula			
NMRAA	Northern Mindanao Regional Athletic Association	Region X or Northern Mindanao			
DavRAA	Davao Regional Athletic Association	Region XI or Davao Region			
SRAA	Soccsksargen Regional Athletic Association	Region XII or Soccsksargen			
CARAGARAA	Caraga Regional Athletic Association	Region XIII or Caraga			

== Venues ==
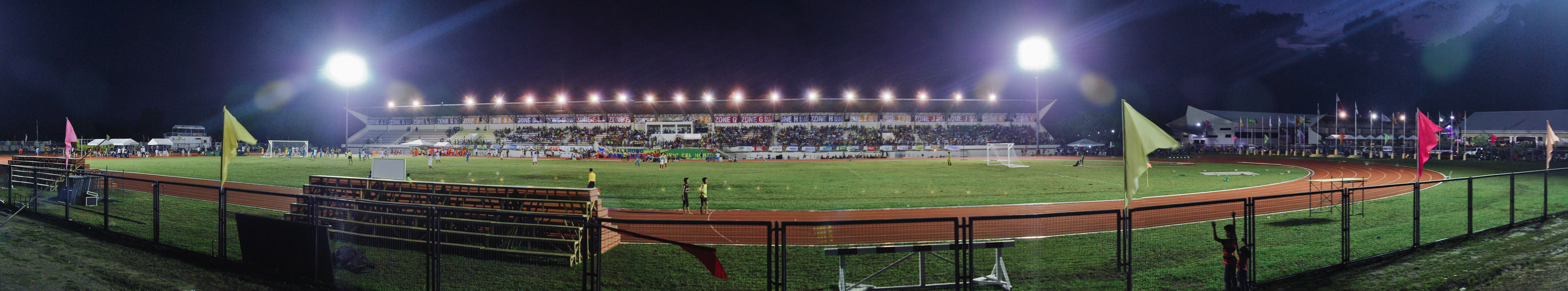
Davao del Norte Sports and Tourism Complex

At least 27 venues were named for the games including venues to be used for demonstration sports and the Special Games. Majority of the venues are within the limits of the city of Tagum and are played within the Davao del Norte Sports and Tourism Complex. The gymnastics event was conducted in Panabo City while one of the venues for the demonstration sport of beach volleyball was in Samal Island.

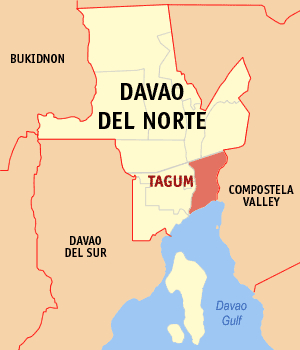
Tagum

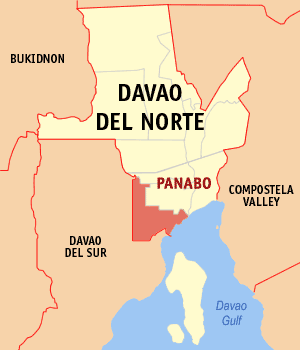
Panabo

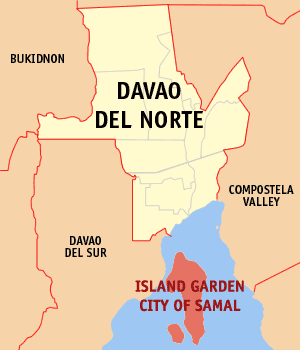
Samal Island (Island Garden City of Samal)

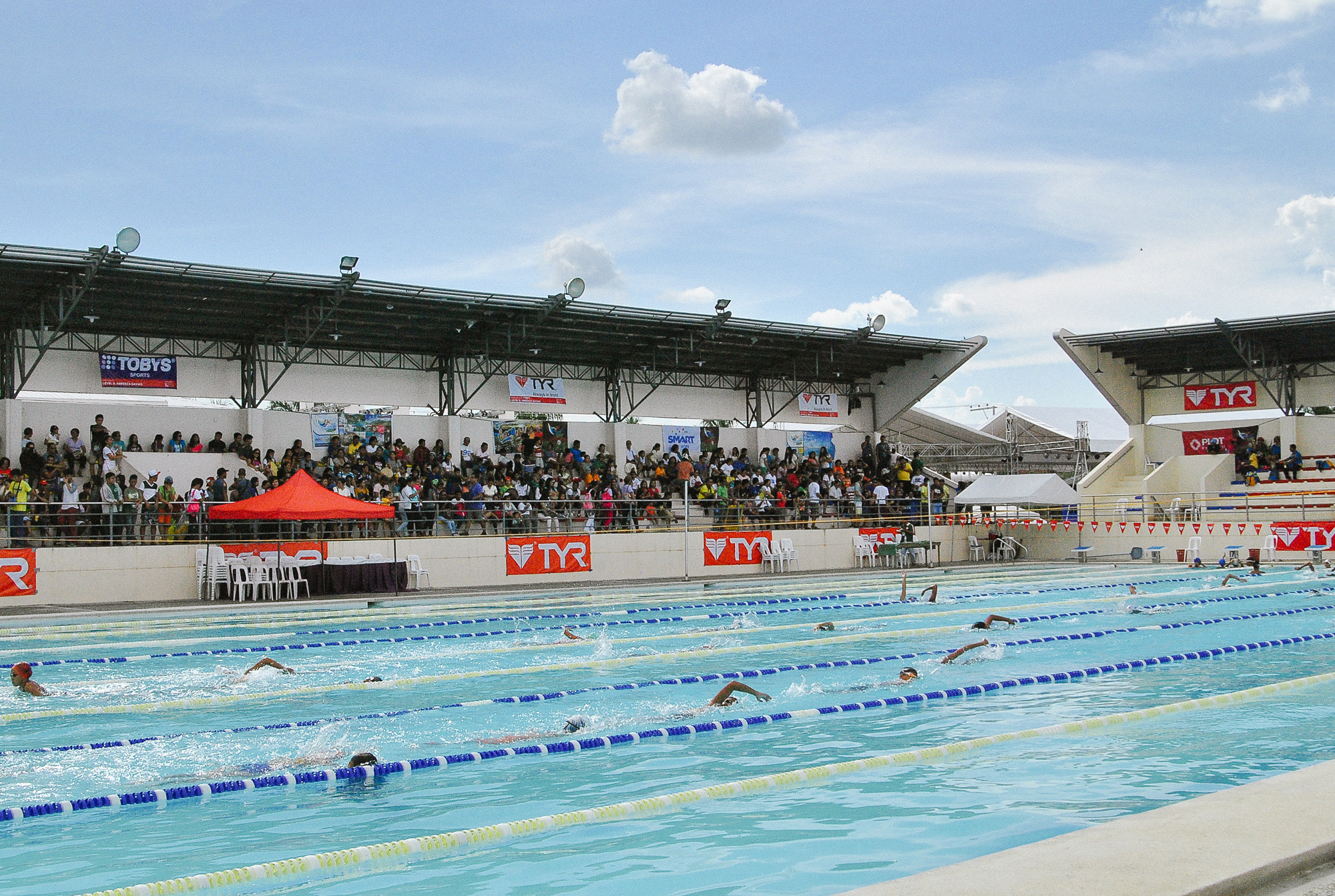
DNSTC Aquatic Center

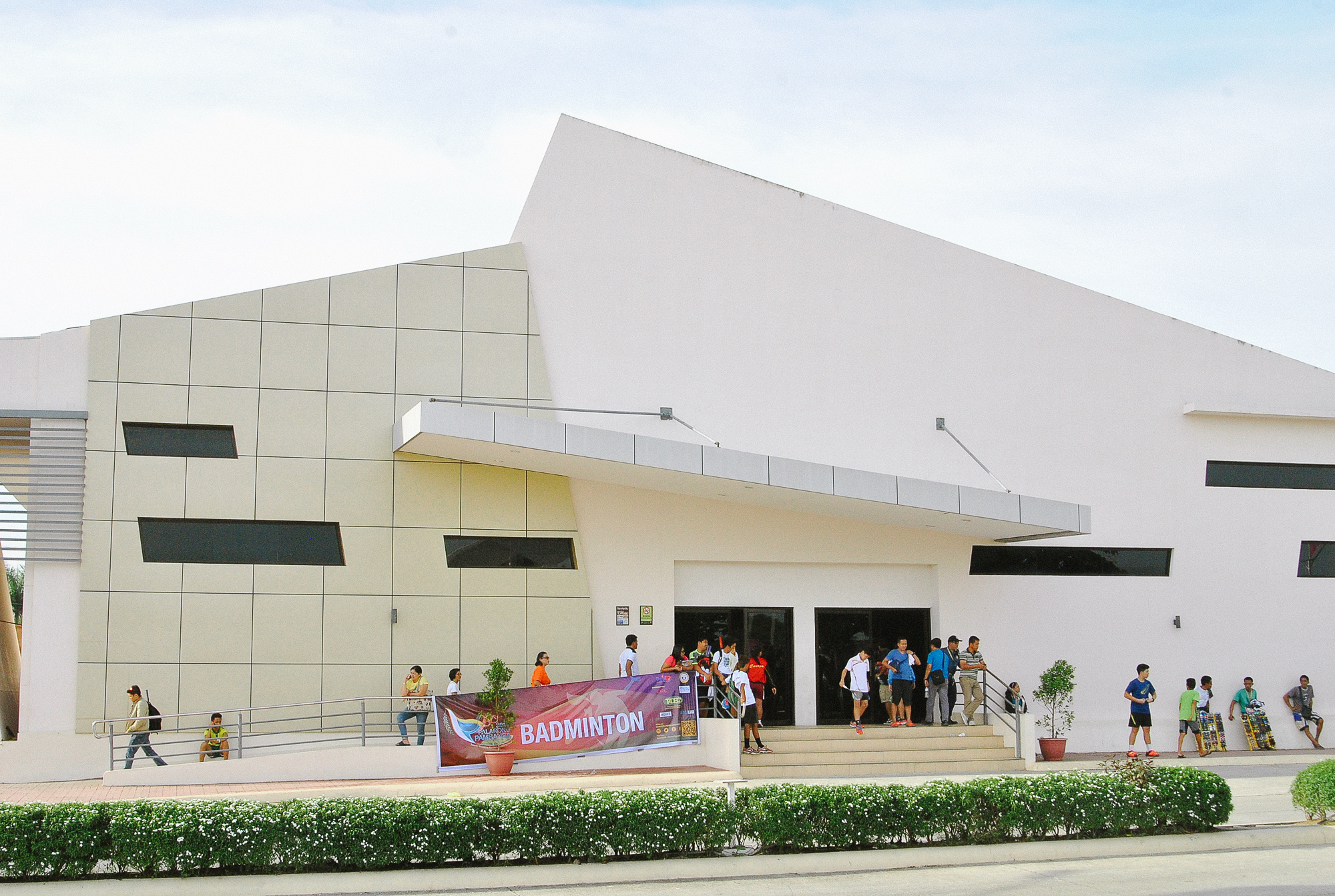
RDR Gymnasium

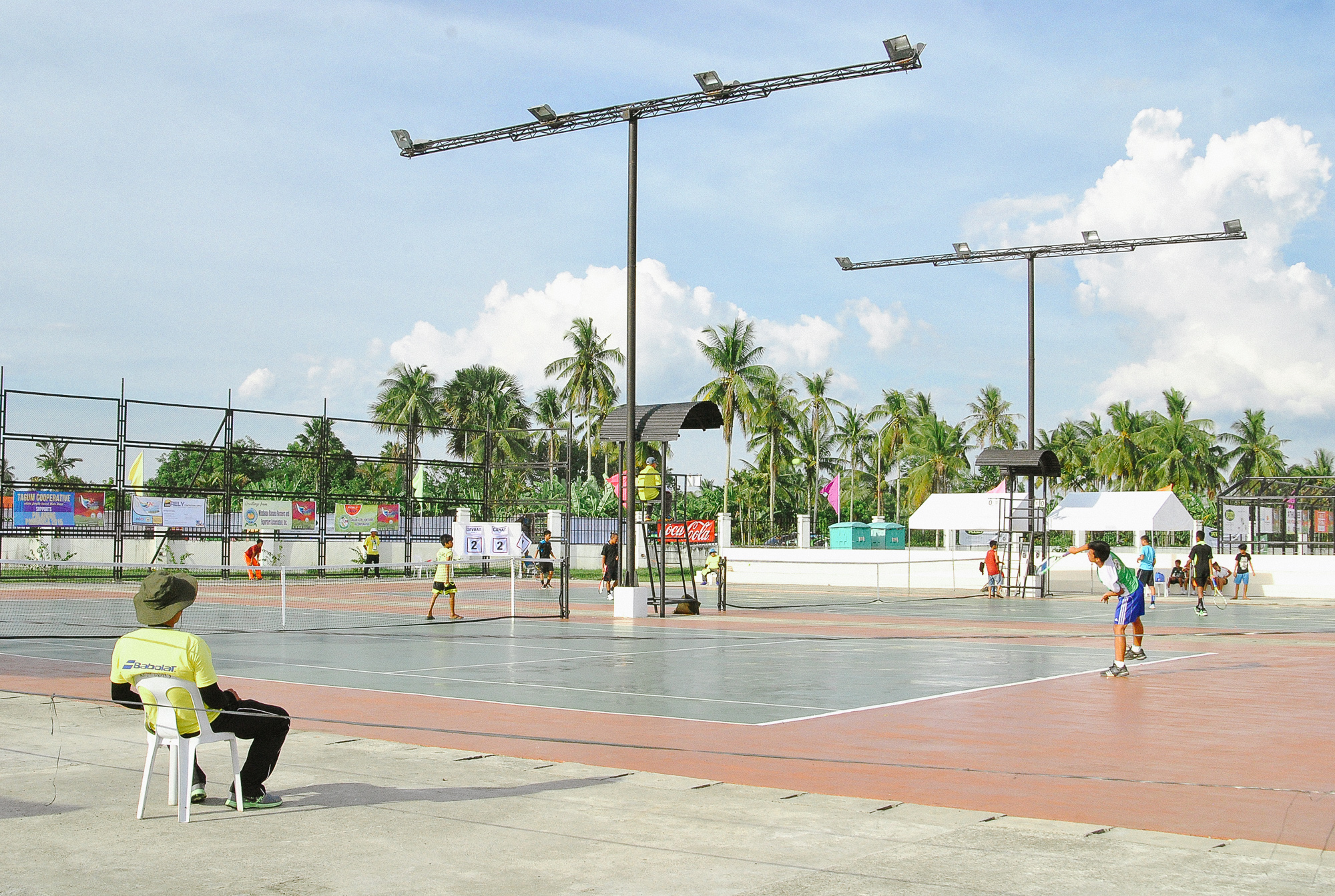
DNSTC Tennis Court

2015 Palarong Pambansa main venues
Event	Venue	Address	Notes
Archery	Davao del Norte Sports and Tourism Complex	Mankilam, Tagum	
Athletics	Davao del Norte Sports and Tourism Complex	Mankilam, Tagum	DNSTC Track Oval
Badminton	Davao del Norte Sports and Tourism Complex	Mankilam, Tagum	Took place in the Rodolfo del Rosario (RDR) Gymnasium, within DNSTC
Aquatics	Davao del Norte Sports and Tourism Complex	Mankilam, Tagum	
Football	Davao del Norte Sports and Tourism Complex	Mankilam, Tagum	Pitch A and B of DNSTC
Tennis	Davao del Norte Sports and Tourism Complex	Mankilam, Tagum	4 tennis courts of DNSTC
Arnis	ACES Tagum College Gymnasium	National Highway, Mankilam, Tagum	
Baseball	LYR Property	National Highway, Canocotan, Tagum	3 baseball diamonds. Unnamed grounds owned by LYR Group of Companies, right across the LGU Tagum Property.
Baseball	LGU Tagum Property	National Highway, Canocotan, Tagum	Unnamed grounds own by the City Government of Tagum, right across the LYR Property.
Basketball	Rotary Gymnasium	Rotary Park, Magugpo Poblacion, Tagum	Located within Rotary Park
Basketball	University of Southeastern Philippines Gymnasium	National Highway, Apokon, Tagum	
Basketball	Barangay San Miguel Gymnasium	San Miguel, Tagum	
Basketball	St. Mary's College Multi-purpose Gymnasium	National Highway, Magugpo East, Tagum	
Boxing	Tagum Trade and Cultural Center Pavilion	Magugpo Poblacion, Tagum	
Chess	Bulwagan ng Lalawigan	Provincial Government Center, Mankilam, Tagum	Located within the Provincial Government Center grounds
Football	Energy Park	Apokon, Tagum	
Softball	Energy Park	Apokon, Tagum	2 diamonds
Gymnastics	Panabo Multi-purpose Cultural, Tourism and Sports Complex	City Government Center, National Highway, Poblacion, Panabo City	Located in neighboring city of Panabo.
Sepak Takraw	Barangay Mankilam Gymnasium	Mankilam, Tagum	Venue for Elementary student competitions
Sepak Takraw	JS Gaisano Gymnasium	Quirante II St., Magugpo Poblacion, Tagum	Venue for Secondary student competition
Sepak Takraw	Assumpta School of Tagum	National Highway, Mankilam, Tagum	Venue for Secondary student competition
Table Tennis	NCCC Mall of Tagum	National Highway, Magugpo East, Tagum	
Taekwondo	Gaisano Mall of Tagum	National Highway, Magugpo East, Tagum	
Tennis	Tagum City Lawn Tennis Club Court	Rotary Park, Magugpo Poblacion, Tagum	3 courts
Tennis	Diocese of Tagum Clergy House (Bishop's Palace)	Seminary Drive, Magugpo West, Tagum	
Volleyball	University of Mindanao Tagum College Gymnasium	Arellano St., Magugpo Central, Tagum	
Volleyball	Max Mirafuentes Academy Gymnasium	Suaybaguio District, Magugpo North, Tagum	
Volleyball	Barangay Magugpo North Gymnasium	Suaybaguio District, Magugpo North, Tagum	
Volleyball	Magugpo UCCP Gymnasium	National Highway, Magugpo East, Tagum	

Demonstration sports venues
Event	Venue	Address	Notes
Futsal	Barangay Apokon Gymnasium	Apokon, Tagum	
Billiards	Gaisano Mall of Tagum	Magugpo East, Tagum	2nd floor
Wrestling	Tagum Fundamental Baptist Academy Gymnasium	Magugpo South, Tagum	
Wushu	Queen of Apostles College Covered Court	Seminary Drive, Magugpo West, Tagum	
Beach Volleyball	Paradise Resort	Babak District, Island Garden City of Samal	Located in Samal Island
Beach Volleyball	Tagum City Volleydrome	Rotary Park, Magugpo Central, Tagum	

Special games venues
Event	Venue	Address	Notes
Bocce	St. Mary's College High School Ground	Magugpo East, Tagum	
Goal Ball	St. Mary's College High School Ground	Magugpo East, Tagum	
Athletics	Davao del Norte Sports and Tourism Complex	Mankilam, Tagum	
Aquatics	Davao del Norte Sports and Tourism Complex	Mankilam, Tagum	

== Billeting Centers ==
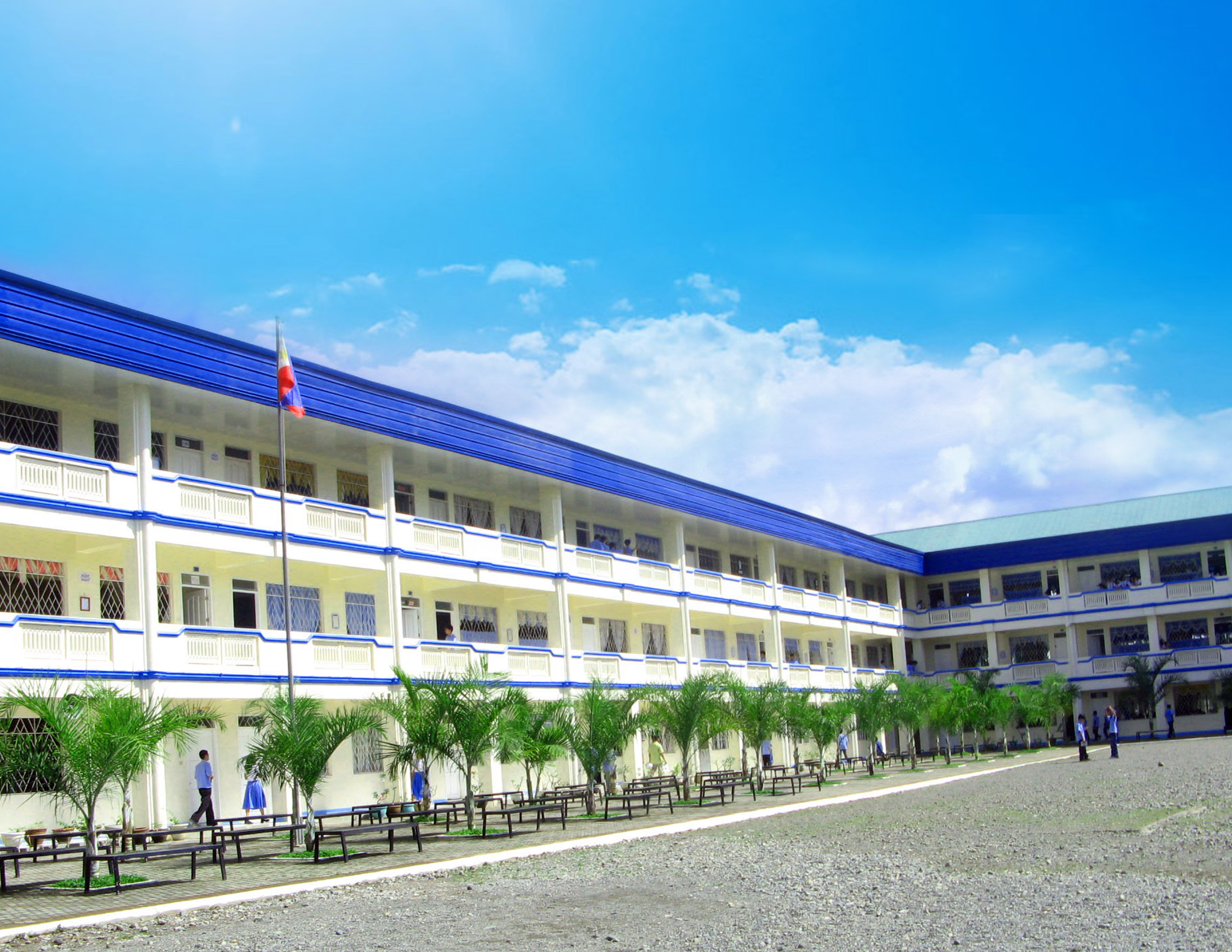
Tagum City National High School

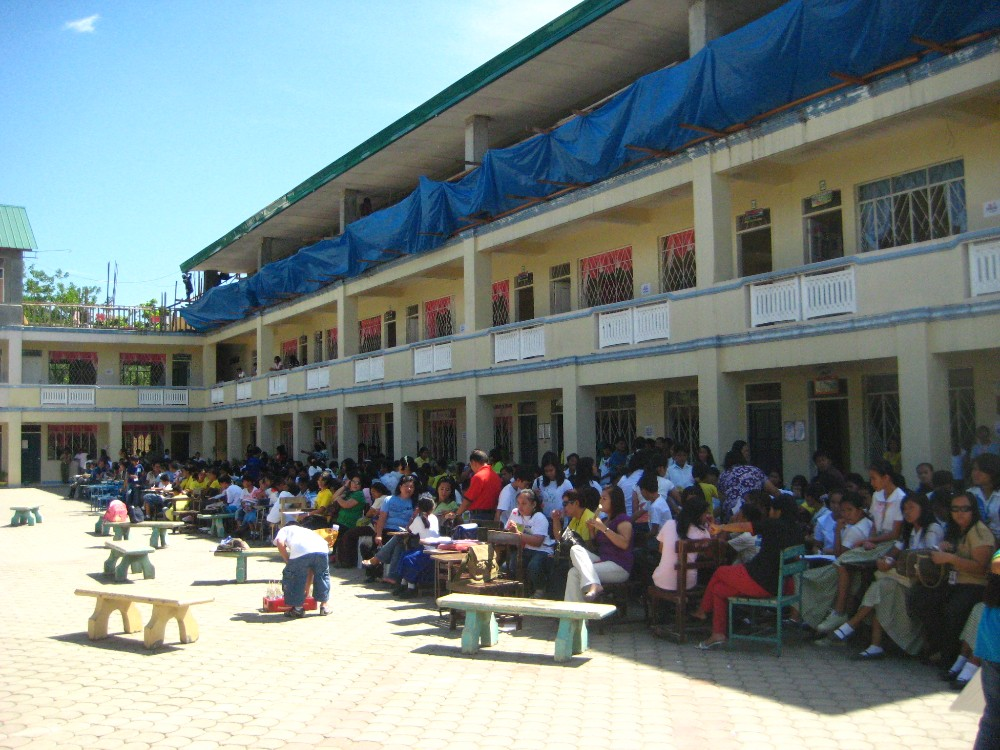
Tagum City National Comprehensive High School

La Filipina National High School

Several public elementary and secondary schools within Tagum and surrounding cities and municipalities within Davao del Norte were selected as billeting and housing centers for the delegates, and schools within close proximity with each other housed the same region.

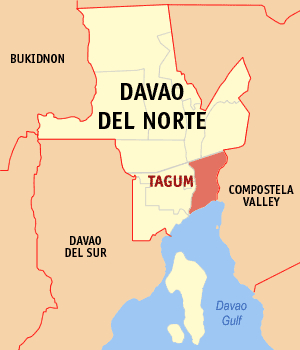
Tagum

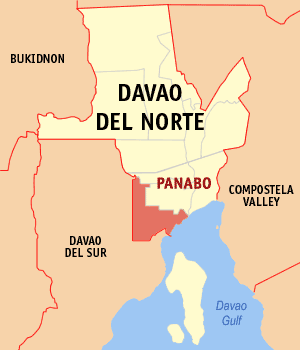
Panabo

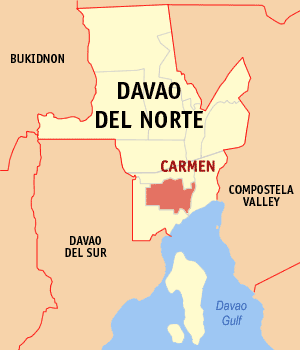
Carmen

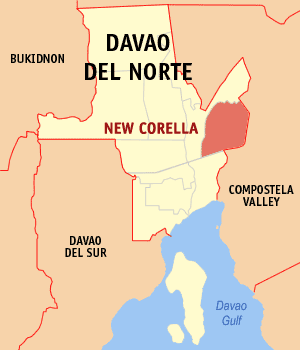
New Corella

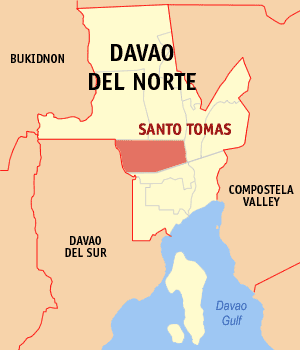
Santo Tomas

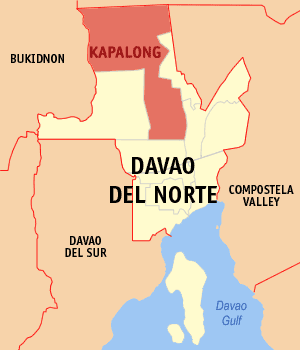
Kapalong

Host Region

Billeting Centers for Regional Delegates
Region	Billeting Center	Address
ARMMAA	Jose Tuazon Jr. Memorial National High School	Madaum, Tagum
ARMMAA	Madaum Elementary School	Madaum, Tagum
CARAA	La Filipina National High School	La Filipina, Tagum
CARAA	La Filipina Elementary School	La Filipina, Tagum
NCRAA	Mangga Elementary School	Mangga, Visayan Village, Tagum
NCRAA	Apokon Elementary School	Apokon, Tagum
RIAA	Magugpo Pilot Central Elementary School	Sobrecarey corner Mabini Sts., Magugpo Central, Tagum
CaVRAA	Magugpo Pilot Imelda Elementary School	Sobrecarey St., Magugpo Central, Tagum
CLRAA	Panabo National High School	Gredu, Panabo City
STCAA	Rizal Elementary School	Sobrecarey St., Magugpo Central, Tagum
MRAA	Sto. Tomas Central Elementary School	Tibal-og, Sto. Tomas, Davao del Norte
BRAA	University of Mindanao Tagum College	Arellano St., Magugpo Central, Tagum
WVRAA	Carmen National High School	National Highway, Poblacion, Carmen, Davao del Norte
WVRAA	Carmen Central Elementary School	National Highway, Poblacion, Carmen, Davao del Norte
CVRAA	Don Ricardo Briz Central Elementary School	Briz District, Magugpo East, Tagum
CVRAA	Bethel UCCP Learning Center	Mabini St., Magugpo Central, Tagum
EVRAA	New Corella National High School	Poblacion, New Corella, Davao del Norte
EVRAA	New Corella Central Elementary School	Poblacion, New Corella, Davao del Norte
ZPRAA	Laureta Elementary School	San Miguel, Tagum
ZPRAA	Laureta National High School	San Miguel, Tagum
NMRAA	Panabo Central Elementary School	National Highway, San Francisco, Panabo City
DavRAA	Tagum City National Comprehensive High School	Mankilam, Tagum
SRAA	Tagum City National High School	Mangga, Visayan Village, Tagum
CARAGARAA	Maniki Central Elementary School	Maniki, Kapalong, Davao del Norte

Billeting Centers for Technical Officials
Billeting Center	Address
Tagum National Trade School	Apokon, Tagum
Visayan Village Elementary School	National Highway, Visayan Village, Tagum
Mankilam Elementary School	National Highway, Mankilam, Tagum
Union Elementary School	National Highway, Mankilam, Tagum
St. Mary's College	National Highway, Magugpo East, Tagum
Gredu Elementary School	National Highway, Gredu, Panabo City

== Media and Telecommunications ==
ABS-CBN, GMA, TV5, CNN Philippines. Rappler, PTV Sports, UNTV, and several other national news organizations covered the games through their regional news bureaus, as well as local and regional news agencies throughout Tagum and the Davao Region such as FM/AM stations and local television channels.

This is the first Palarong Pambansa to have a daily live video broadcast of all major events, including the opening and closing ceremonies, and sporting competitions; these were shown in the Palarong Pambansa 2015 official website, SkyCable Tagum Channel 12/SkyCable Manila Channel 85 (Digital, also on Destiny Cable) for subscribers in Mega Manila, and Rappler. In addition, the Davao del Norte Provincial Information Office also created several social media accounts (Facebook, Twitter, YouTube, and Instagram) and the social media hashtags #DavNorPalaro2015 and #SeeYouInDavNor dedicated to promote the 2015 Palarong Pambansa and the host province of Davao del Norte.

In free TV, the highlights and closing ceremonies was aired on PTV Sports, Sky Cable Channel 85 (Mega Manila; from May 11–17, 2015) and ABS-CBN Sports+Action, where a one-hour TV special hosted by TJ Manotoc and Tina Marasigan will also be shown on May 30.

To help with the documentation services, the organizers and the Davao del Norte Provincial Information Office sought the services of video production companies within Davao region to help cover the events, notably with the use of aerial drone photography and videography during the opening and closing ceremonies, and the live broadcast of the games. Local photography clubs in the region, such as the Camera Club of Tagum and Tagum Photographers' Society, provided additional photo documentation. A photo contest was also held in order to encourage other photographers to participate in documenting the various sports events.

All sporting venues and billeting centers are provided with high-speed and free wireless internet connectivity courtesy of Smart Communications, the main telecommunications provider and sponsor. This was ensured so that athletes, coaches, guests, visitors, game officials, media practitioners, and exhibitors are provided with up-to-date news, information, and content about the Palaro through its official website and social media.

== Security ==
Security during the 2015 Palarong Pambansa was handled by the Davao Regional Peace and Order Council (Davao RPOC) and Provincial Government of Davao del Norte through the Armed Forces of the Philippines and Philippine National Police. Almost 2,000 security personnel were deployed in all venues, billeting centers, checkpoints, and public areas throughout the games.

Several roads leading to DNSTC and throughout Tagum were blocked to incoming traffic by the PNP and AFP units. Several Joint AFP-PNP Action Centers (JAPAC) and manned checkpoints were situated in all major thoroughfares the city, including the entry and exit points at the Davao-Butuan-General Santos National Highway (Davao-Agusan Fil-Japan Friendship Highway) leading to Davao City and Compostela Valley, to the municipalities of Asuncion and Kapalong, and to Mati City, Davao Oriental. There was also a significant increase of police and military presence in all venues and billeting centers.

A province-wide suspension of validity of permit to carry firearms outside of residence (gun ban) was also enforced by the Philippine National Police through a Sangguniang Panlalawigan resolution from 30 April 2015 until 15 May 2015 to ensure that no gun-related violence or crime will be committed during the conduct of the games. According to Senior Police Superintendent Samuel Gadingan, the gun ban will boost security during the games.

Davao City Mayor Rodrigo Duterte also assured the visiting delegates that they will safe against terrorist attacks, while he called for insurgent groups such as the New People's Army and other armed groups not to create trouble during the games.

== Transportation ==
Five jeepneys and three vans were provided for each region by the provincial government in order to transport their delegates to and from the venues and billeting centers. Delegates can also rent additional vehicles if necessary, for an extra fee. Additional vehicles were also allocated to transport delegates between venues, especially to venues located further than 5 km from DNSTC such as the Energy Park at Apokon, ten minutes away from DNSTC, or the Panabo Multipurpose Cultural, Tourism and Sports Complex which is thirty minutes away at Panabo City. Within the city, commuter tricycles and short-haul jeepneys provide quick and easy transportation between points of destination. Some tricycles even had built-in WiFi routers and wireless internet so that the athletes and coaches who will ride in their tricycles can still connect to the internet, without additional cost to their fare.

To maintain easy access to the contest venues, only vehicles with a VIP Vehicular Pass, vehicles owned by the participating regional DepEd offices, and vehicles by the Provincial and City Government, emergency services, police, and military were allowed to drive through the blocked roads and enter the venues. The Capitol Circumferential Road and Capitol Avenue, both passing by the Provincial Government Center and DNSTC, were turned into pedestrian streets and parking spaces for private vehicles without the said vehicular pass.

== Sponsorship ==
Tagum Agricultural Development Company, Inc. (TADECO), Damosa Land, Davao Packaging Corporation, Davao International Container Terminal, Inc. and Pearl Farm Beach Resort are among the main sponsors of the games. The City Government of Davao also gave one million pesos as sponsorship, together with it security and medical support to augment what the Provincial Government has already in place. Smart Communications provided the telecommunications infrastructures on sports venues and billeting centers as part of its sponsorship.

== Local Economy ==
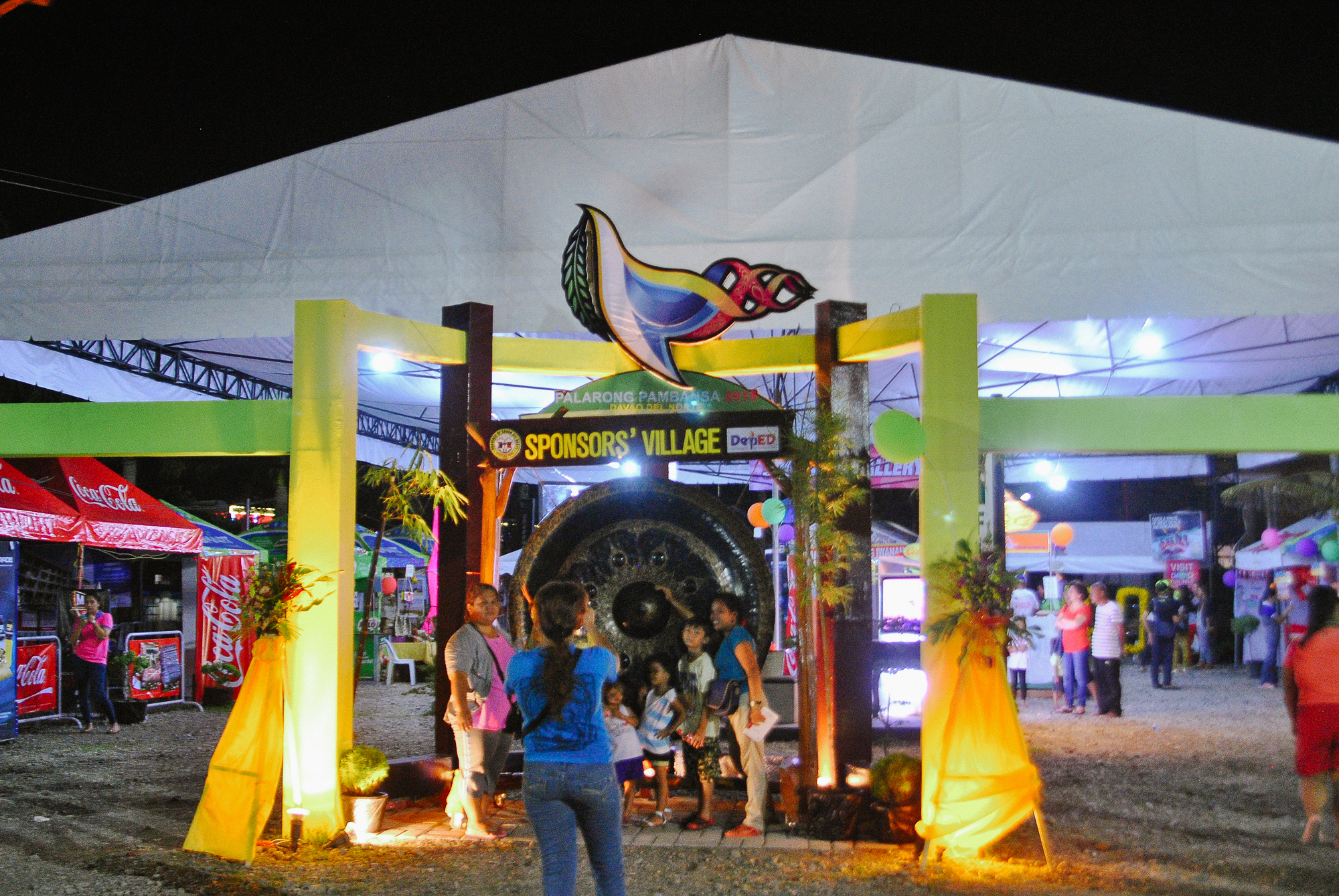
Sponsors' Area

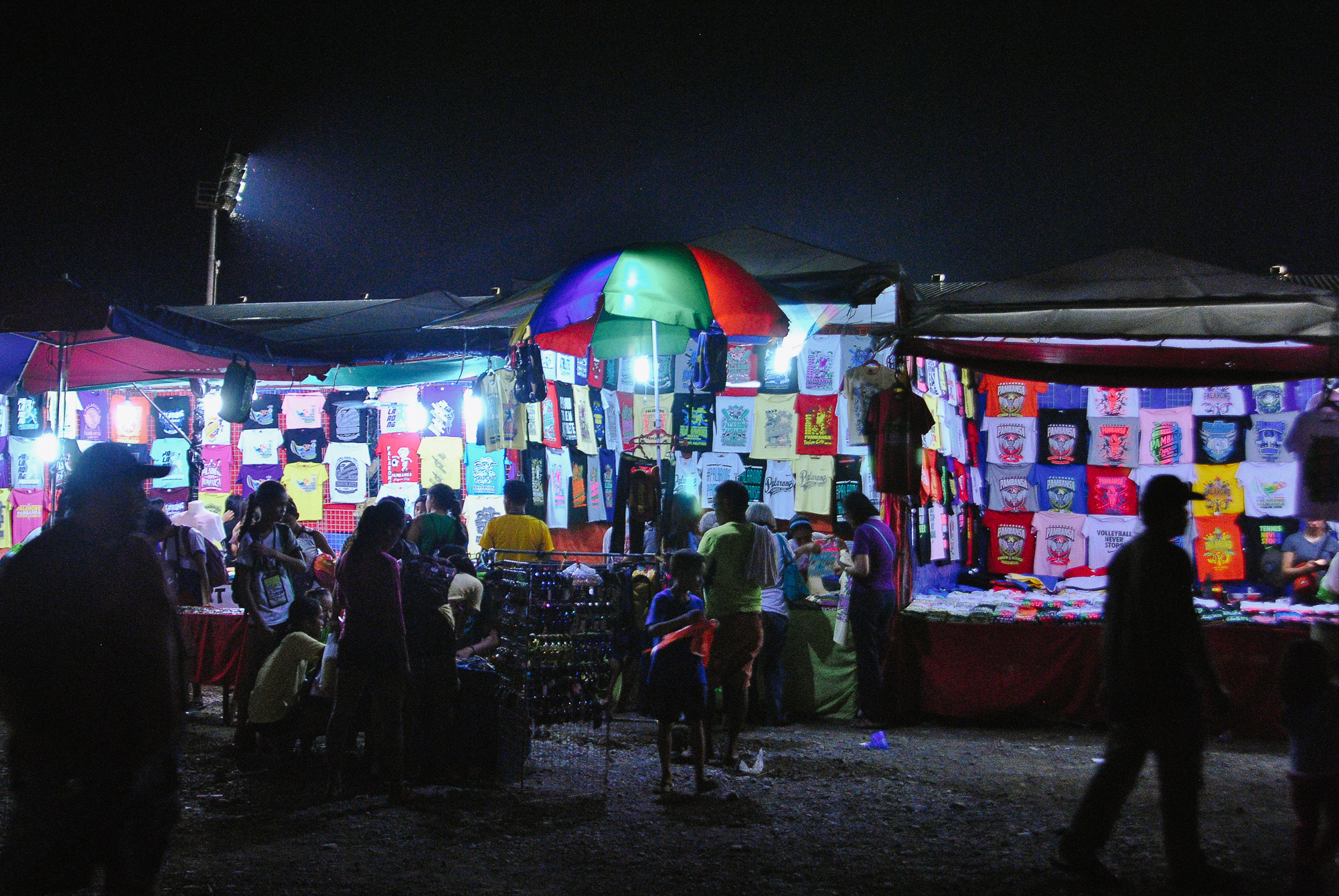
Stalls selling souvenir items at the Tiangge area.

The Provincial Government has allocated lots within the DNSTC as "Tiangge" (market) areas where exhibitors and vendors can sell their products, from food and drinks to shirt memorabilia to indigenous products. The Tourism Park within DNSTC also hosts a similar market area which is mostly occupied by food stalls and restaurants; at night this area becomes crowded with people as nightly concerts from local and national artists and celebrities are held here with no entrance fee. A Sponsors' Area is located beside the RDR Gymnasium where the main sponsors for the 2015 Palarong Pambansa can promote their products and services.

Due to the massive influx of delegates and visitors, around 40 dormitories, apartments, guest houses, inns, and even private homes opened their doors. Many of these housing establishments were already fully booked as early as one month before the Palaro games are to be held. Most of their customeres were chaperones, parents and relatives of student-athletes, and guests from other regions who came to Tagum just to witness the Palarong Pambansa.

According to City Tourism Council Chairperson Marlene Alastra, the 2015 Palarong Pambansa may double or triple the expected collected revenue for this year. Shopping centers have also provided discounts to Palaro delegates when they present their IDs. Even tricycle drivers (the main mode of transportation within the city) have lowered their fare rate from PHP9.00 to PHP8.00, but they were able to collect more during the conduct of the games, especially that it was held during summer vacation.

== The Palaro ==
=== Calendar ===
All times and dates are PST (UTC+8, GMT+0800)

OC	Opening ceremony	●	Event competitions	1	Gold medals	CC	Closing ceremony

Regular Games
May		3 Sun		4 Mon		5 Tue		6 Wed		7 Thu		8 Fri		9 Sat		Gold medals
–		AM	PM	AM	PM	AM	PM	AM	PM	AM	PM	AM	PM	AM	PM	–
Ceremonies					OC										CC	N/A
Archery		●				●		●		●		●				16
Arnis		●		●		●		●		●		●				18
Aquatics						●		●		●		●				60
Athletics		●				●		●		●		●				88
Badminton		●				●		●		●		●				16
Baseball		●		●		●		●		●		●				2
Basketball		●				●		●		●		●		●		4
Boxing							●		●		●		●			5
Chess		●				●		●		●		●				16
Football		●				●		●		●		●		●		2
Gymnastics		●		●		●		●		●		●				43
Sepak Takraw	Elem.	●		●		●		●		●		●				6
Sepak Takraw	Sec.	●		●		●		●		●		●				6
Softball		●		●		●		●		●		●				2
Table tennis		●				●		●		●		●				12
Taekwondo						●		●		●		●				48
Tennis		●				●		●		●		●				12
Volleyball	Sec. G	●		●		●		●		●		●				4
Volleyball	Others	●		●		●		●		●		●		●		4
Total																354
–		AM	PM	AM	PM	AM	PM	AM	PM	AM	PM	AM	PM	AM	PM	–
May		Sun		Mon		Tue		Wed		Thu		Fri		Sat		Gold medals
Reference: 2015 Palaro Pambansa Official Website

Demonstration Games
May	3 Sun		4 Mon		5 Tue		6 Wed		7 Thu		8 Fri		9 Sat		Gold medals
–	AM	PM	AM	PM	AM	PM	AM	PM	AM	PM	AM	PM	AM	PM	–
Billiards					●		●		●		●				4
Futsal		●	●		●		●		●		●				1
Wrestling								●		●					10
Wushu					●		●		●						10
Beach Volleyball									●		●		TBD		TBA
–	AM	PM	AM	PM	AM	PM	AM	PM	AM	PM	AM	PM	AM	PM	–
Total															25
May	3 Sun		4 Mon		5 Tue		6 Wed		7 Thu		8 Fri		9 Sat		Gold medals
Reference: 2015 Palaro Pambansa Official Website

Special Games
May	3 Sun		4 Mon		5 Tue		6 Wed		7 Thu		Gold medals
	AM	PM	AM	PM	AM	PM	AM	PM	AM	PM	–
Bocce	●				●		●		●		6
Goal Ball		●				●		●		●	1
Athletics	●				●		●		●		53
Aquatics						●		●		●	30
–	AM	PM	AM	PM	AM	PM	AM	PM	AM	PM	–
Total											90
May	3 Sun		4 Mon		5 Tue		6 Wed		7 Thu		Gold medals
Reference: 2015 Palaro Pambansa Official Website

=== Opening ceremony ===
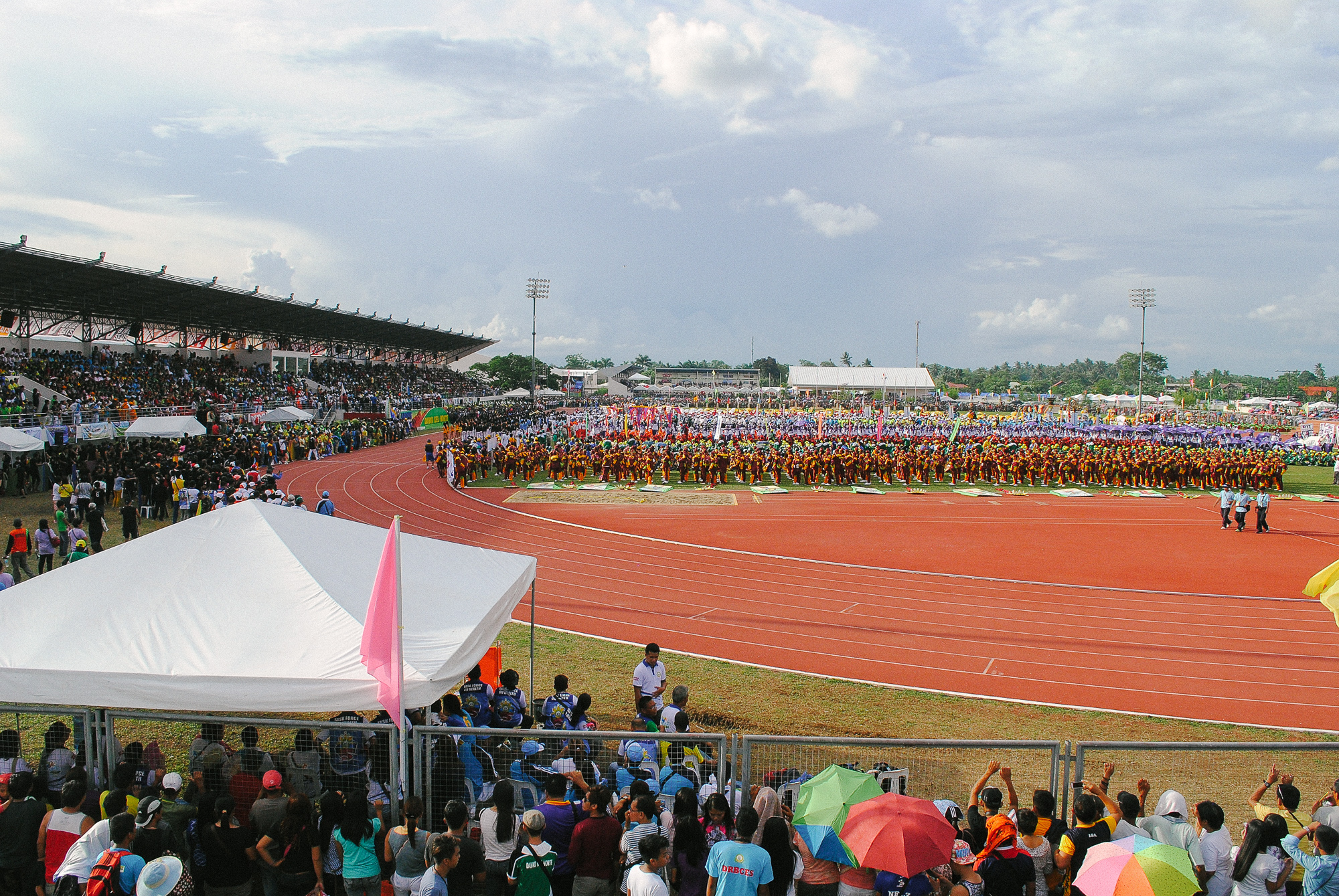
After the welcome parade.

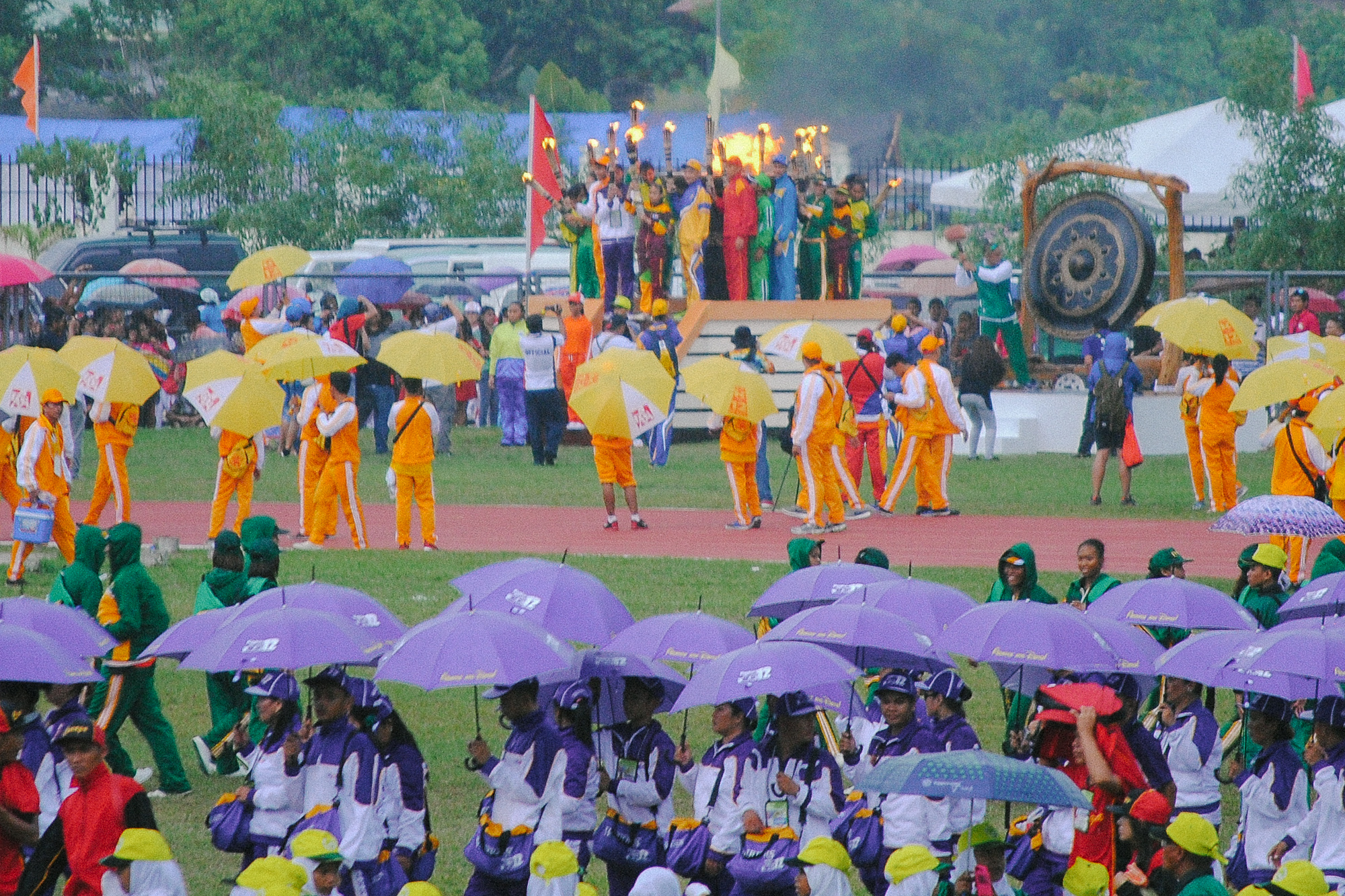
17 athletes from all participating regions lit the cauldron with a symbolic torch representing the tri-peoples of Davao del Norte.

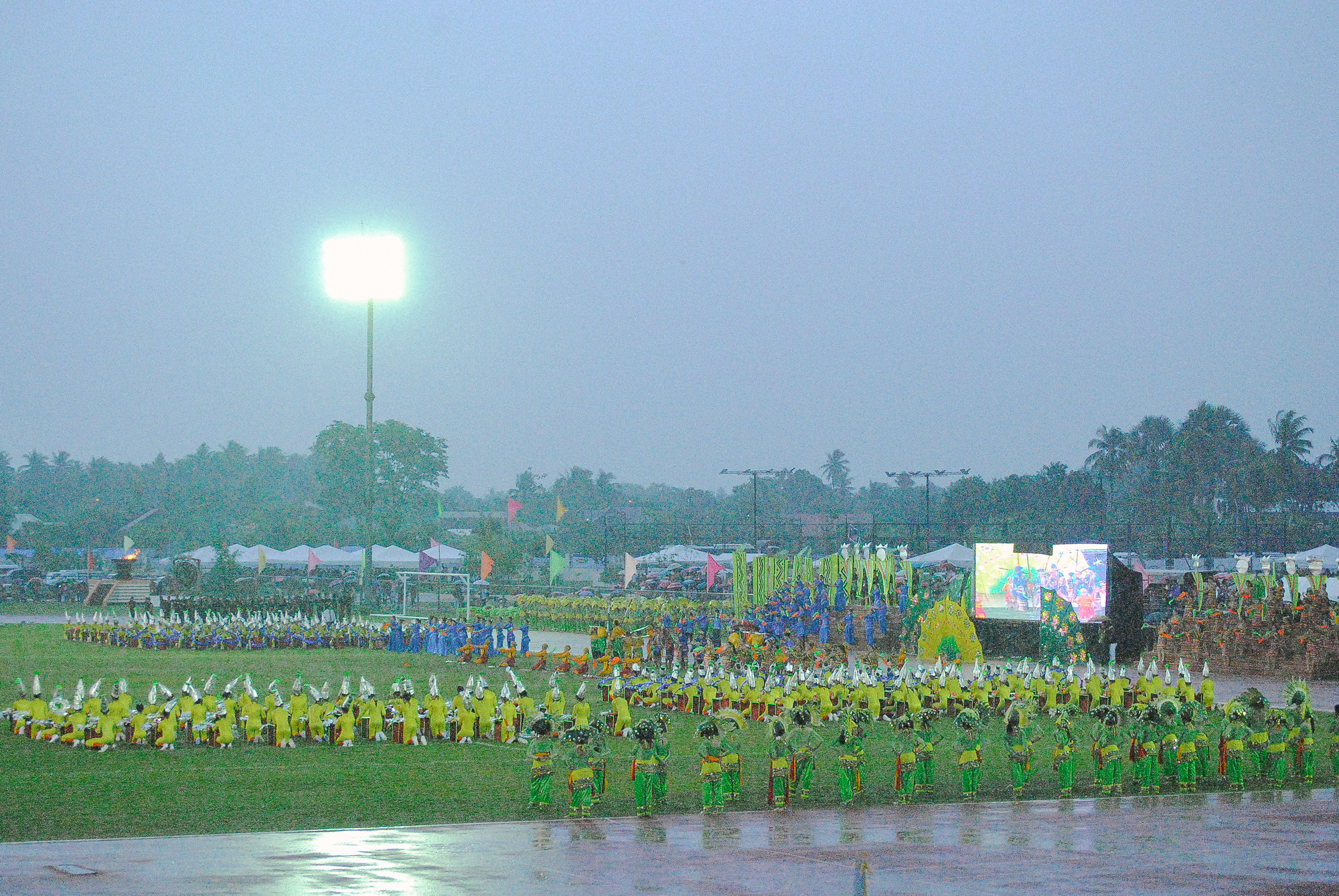
Field demonstration of selected students and teachers from Davao del Norte, Tagum, Panabo, and Samal.

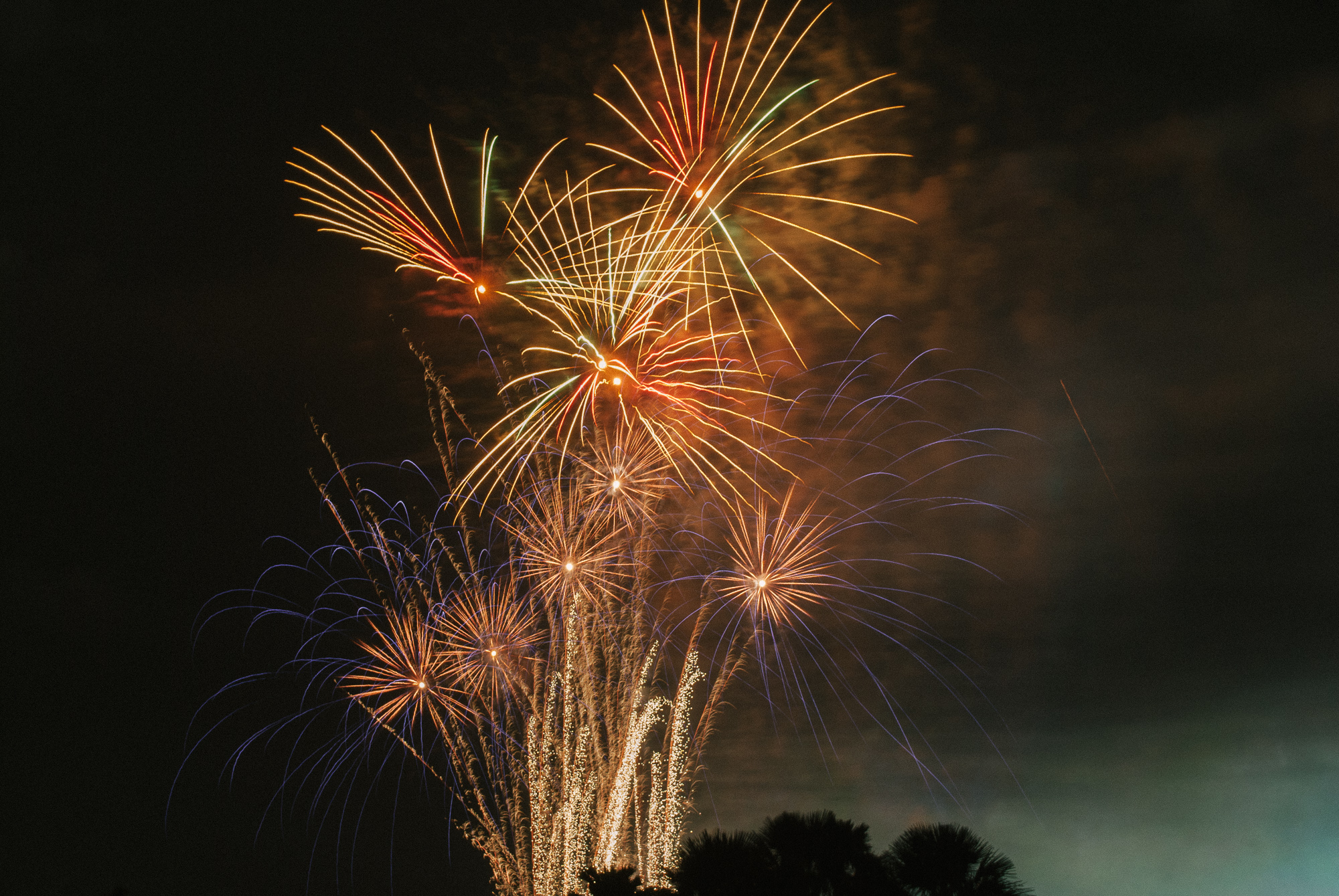
Pyromusical show.

The opening ceremony took place on 4 May, 4:00 PM PST on the second day of the games at the Davao del Norte Sports and Tourism Complex. It was originally scheduled to take place on the first day of the games but was moved to avoid an "audience clash" with Mayweather vs. Pacquiao fight scheduled to take place in Las Vegas on May 2 (or May 3, PST).

The welcome parade for the delegates started at 3:00 PM PST at the Provincial Government Center, where they marched to DNSTC. By tradition, the delegates came in order of region (I, II, III, IV-A, IV-B, V, VI, VII, VIII, IX, X, XII, XIII, ARMM, CAR, and NCR), with the host region (XI) entering last. The delegates performed their respective saludo or welcome greeting as they marched down the track and arrived in front of the podium. Some regions also featured their most popular attractions, icons, personalities, and festivals during the parade; Region IV-B (Mimaropa) had athletes wear masks from the Moriones festival, Region VI (Western Visayas) had delegates wearing costumes from the Dinagyang and Ati-Atihan festivals, the Region VII (Central Visayas) had dancers from the Sinulog festival, and Region XII (Soccsksargen) marched with colorful costumes and flags, a banner that reads "Region XII is K-12 ready" (a tribute to the K-12 Program recently adopted by the country), and another banner with the face of its "finest Soccsksargen warrior" Manny Pacquiao. Not to be beaten, the hosts brought a huge replica of the Philippine eagle alongside images depicting the provinces as tribesmen. After the delegates' parade, the technical officials followed. Paratroopers from the Armed Forces of the Philippines performed an aerial paradrop afterwards, carrying with them flags of the Palarong Pambansa and of Davao del Norte.

Seventeen athletes led by 2014 Palarong Pambansa table tennis champion Kyla Cielo Bernaldez of Panabo City, Davao del Norte lit the cauldron with a three-piece torch that was inspired from the tri-peoples of Davao del Norte: a top piece inspired by the tambara, an altar where the traditional aboriginal tribes (lumad) offer to their spirits, a middle piece featuring authentic Islamic beadwork and sequins, and a bottom piece which looks like a chalice, symbolizing the Christian faith. The torch was designed by Banjo Sappore Jr. from the Ford Academy of the Arts.

Just after the speech of Davao del Norte governor Rodolfo del Rosario at around 4:30 PM PST, the hot and sunny afternoon turned into a rainy one, prompting both DILG and DepEd secretaries, Mar Roxas and Bro. Armin Luistro to call for the rushing of the opening ceremonies. Roxas expressed concern that the rain may affect the health of the Palaro athletes, and then led the crowd to chants. Luistro informally opened the games by hollering the already-soaked but visibly enjoying students (who endured marching under a hot summer afternoon) with the words "Class dismissed!"

Many parts of the opening program were omitted or shortened because of force majeure. Despite the heavy downpour of rain, almost 1,000 students and teachers from across all cities and municipalities of Davao del Norte performed a thirty-minute field demonstration, much to the delight and amazement of the crowd. The opening ceremony ended with a ten-minute pyromusical show and a lights-and-sounds show at the Provincial Capitol Building and Capitol Park at 7:00 PM PST.

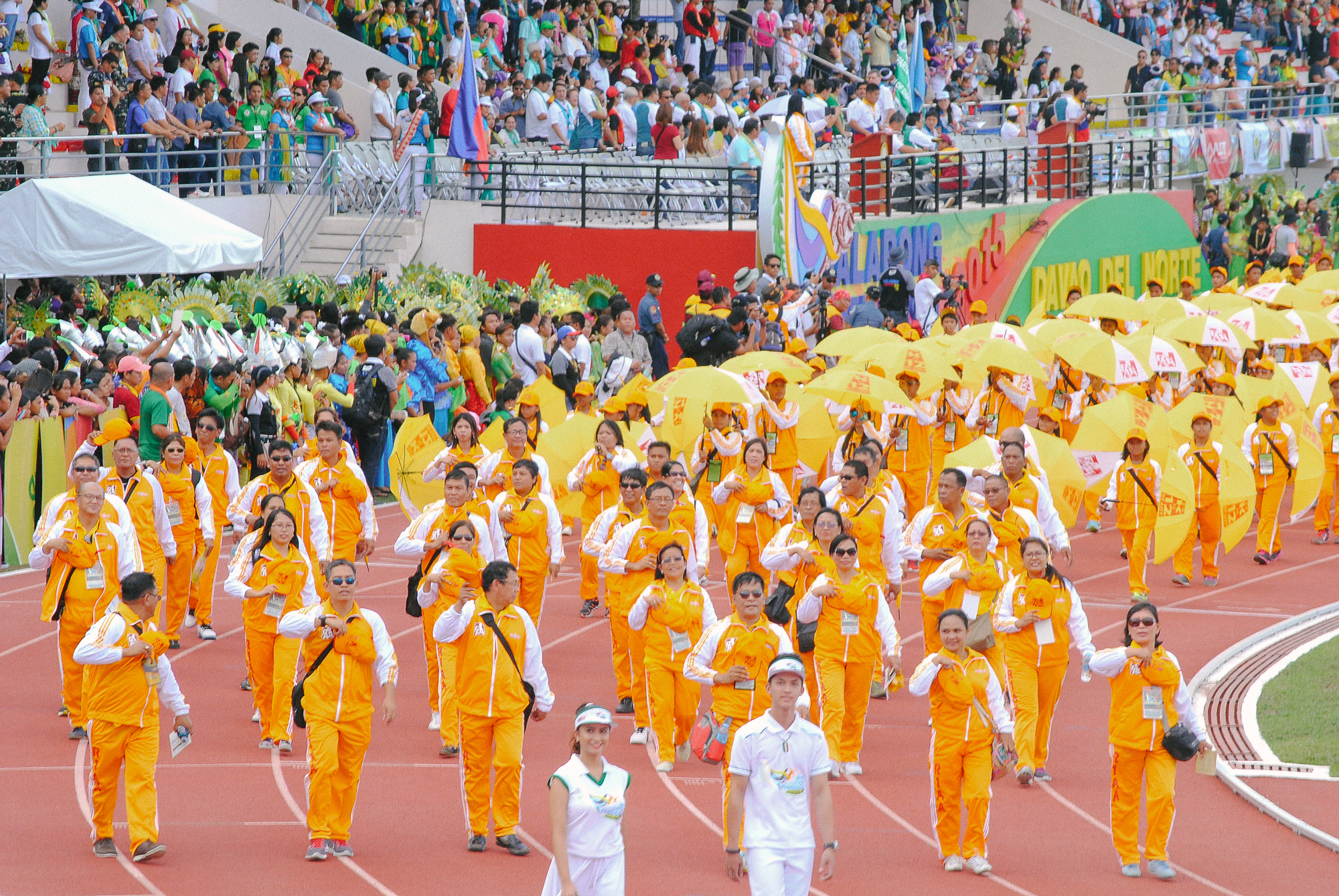
Ilocos

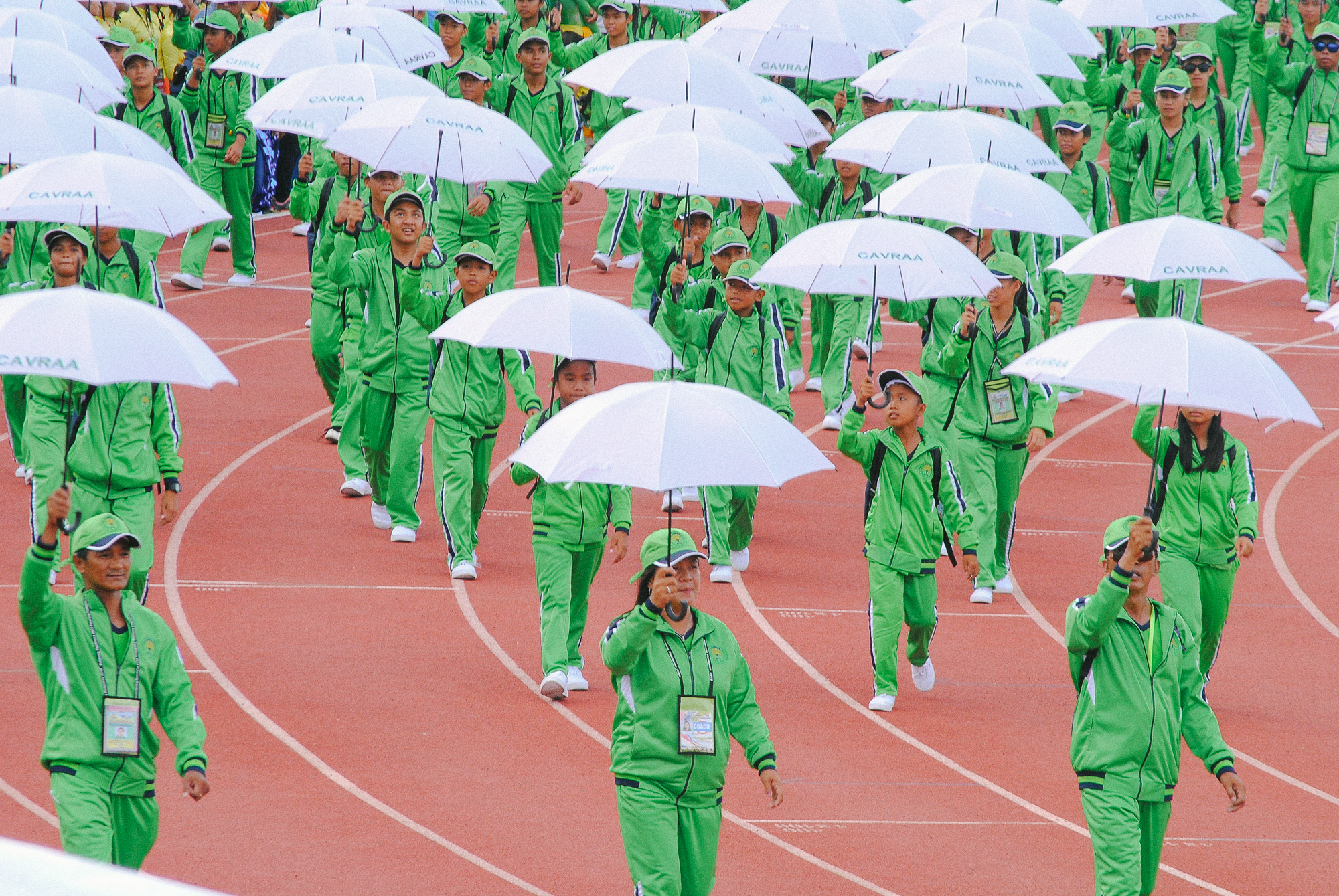
Cagayan Valley

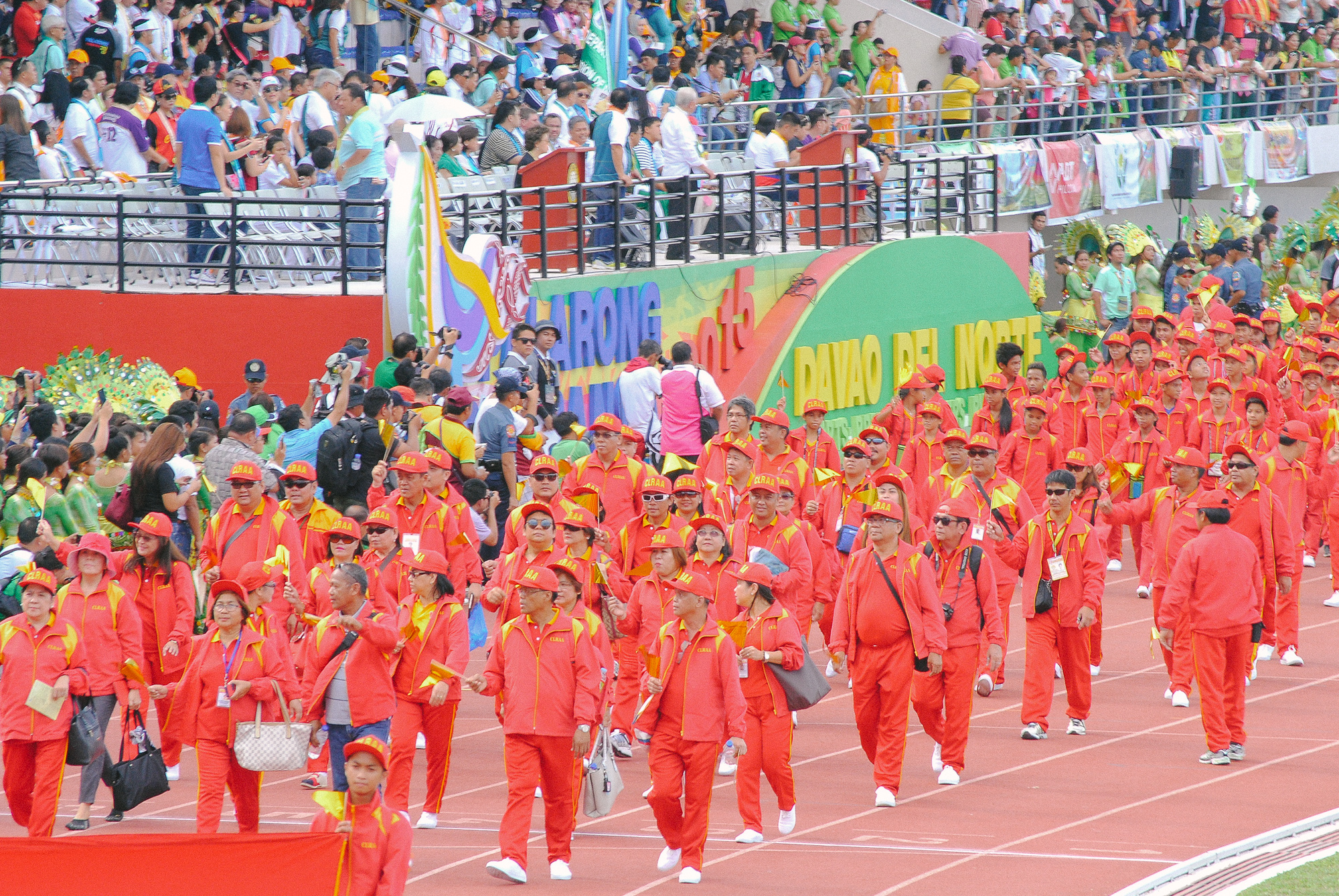
Central Luzon

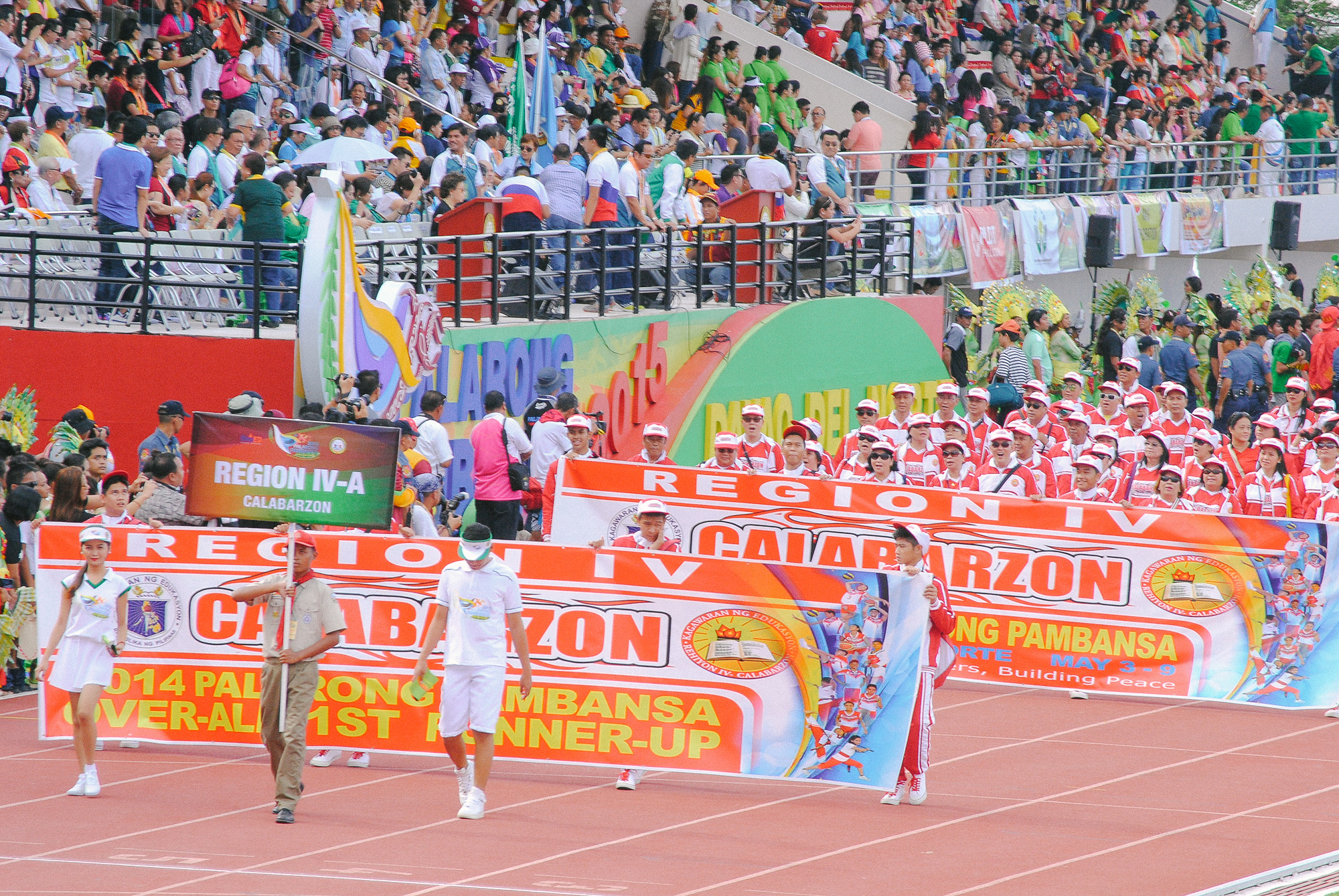
Southern Tagalog-Calabarzon

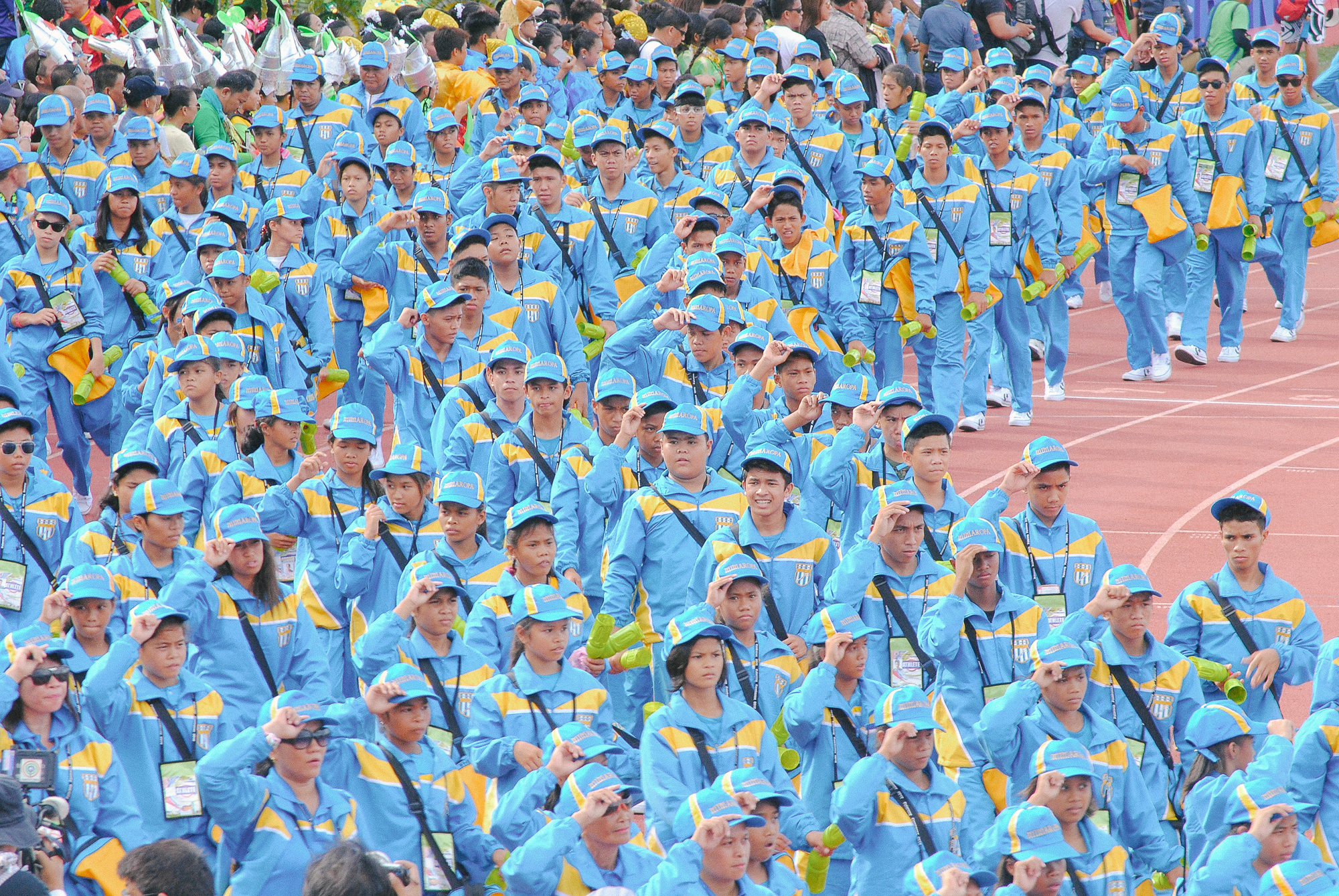
Southern Tagalog-Mimaropa

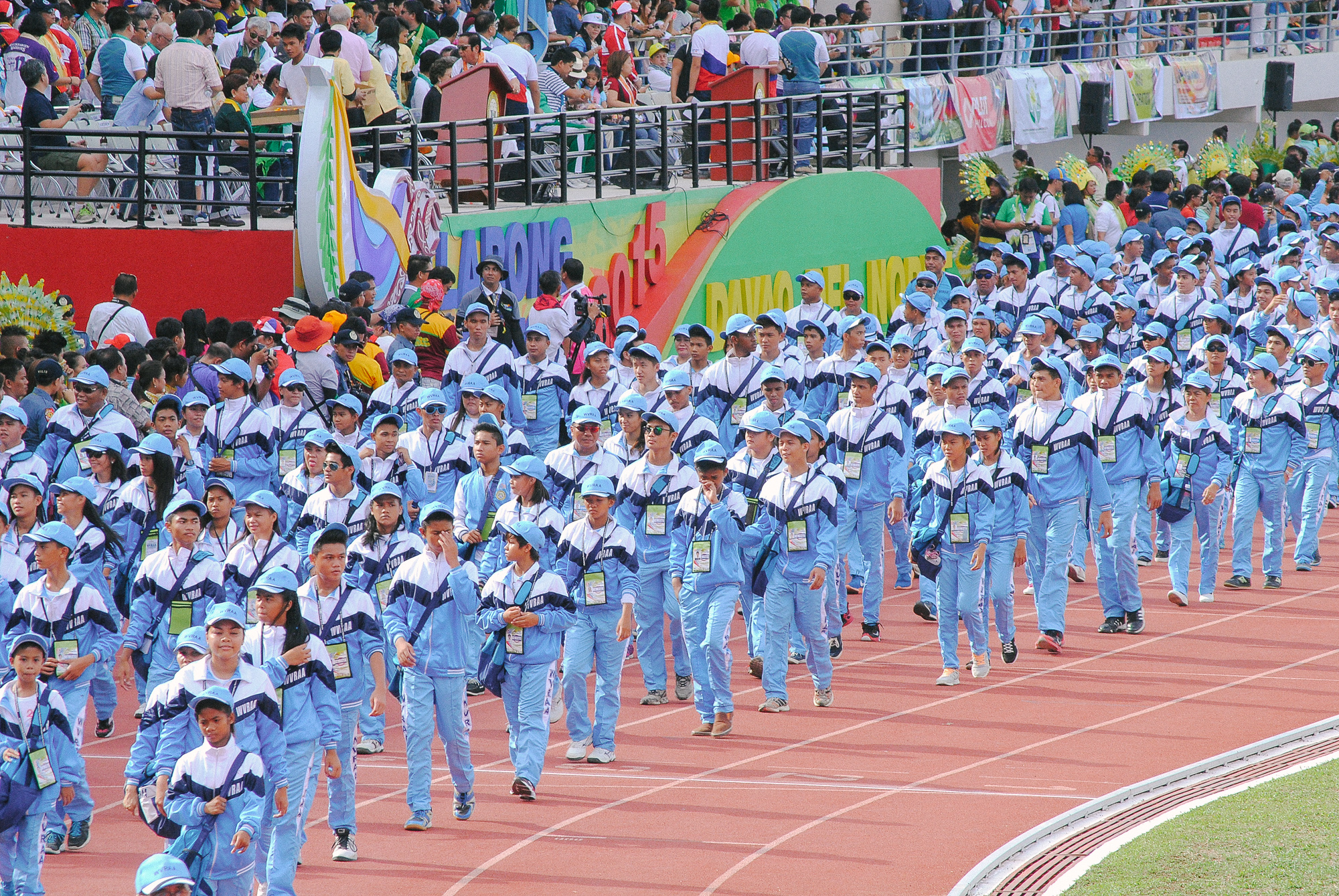
Western Visayas

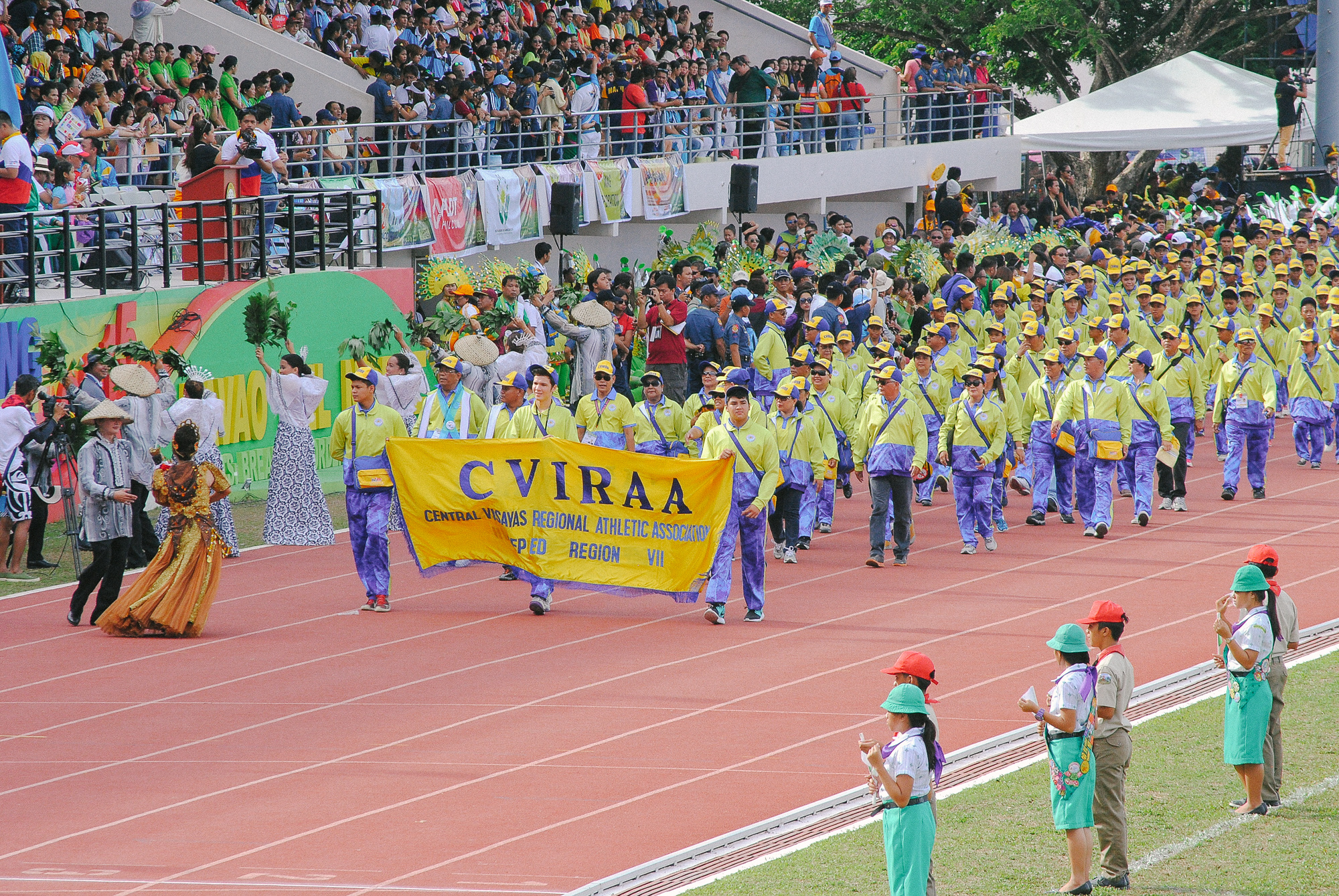
Central Visayas

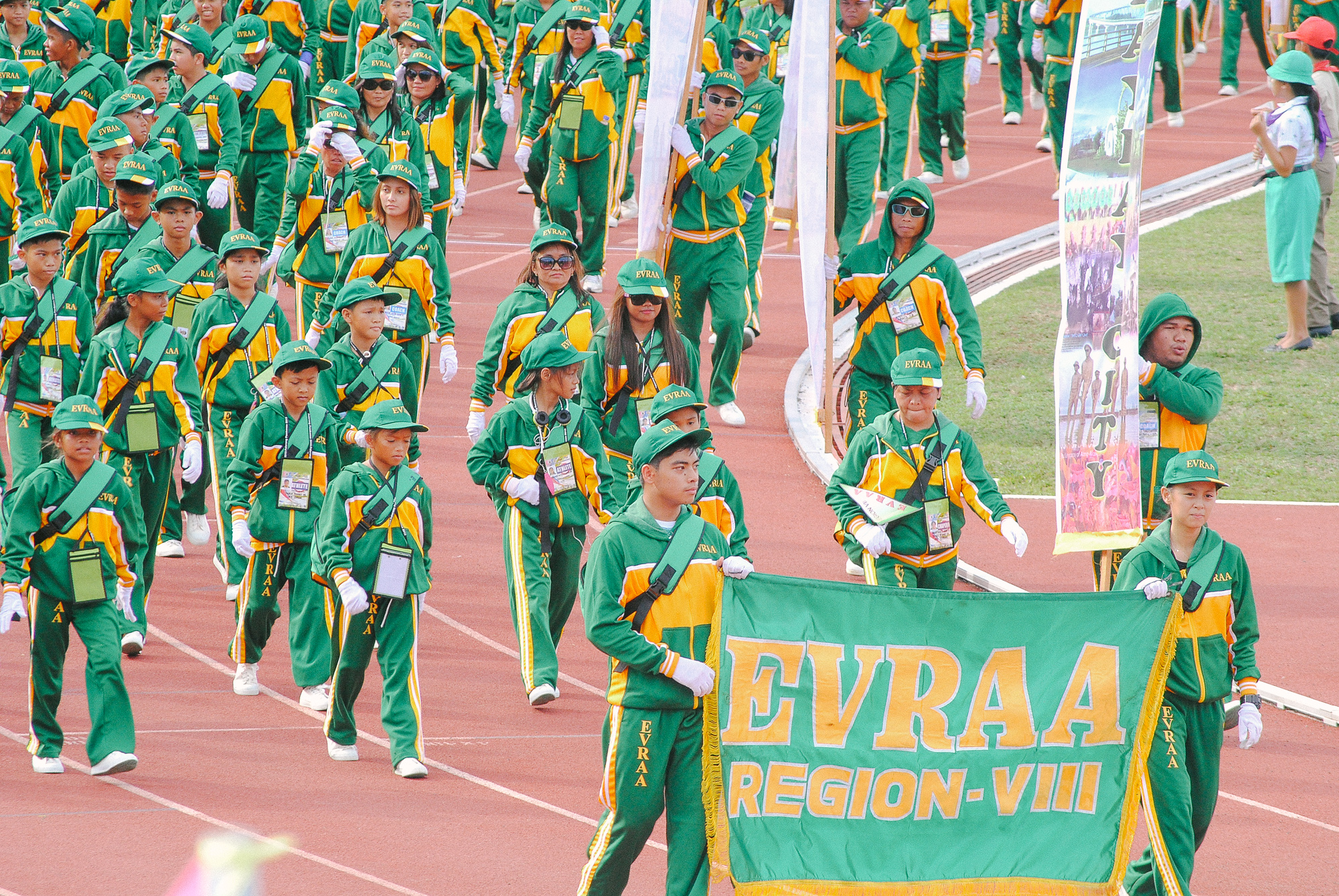
Eastern Visayas

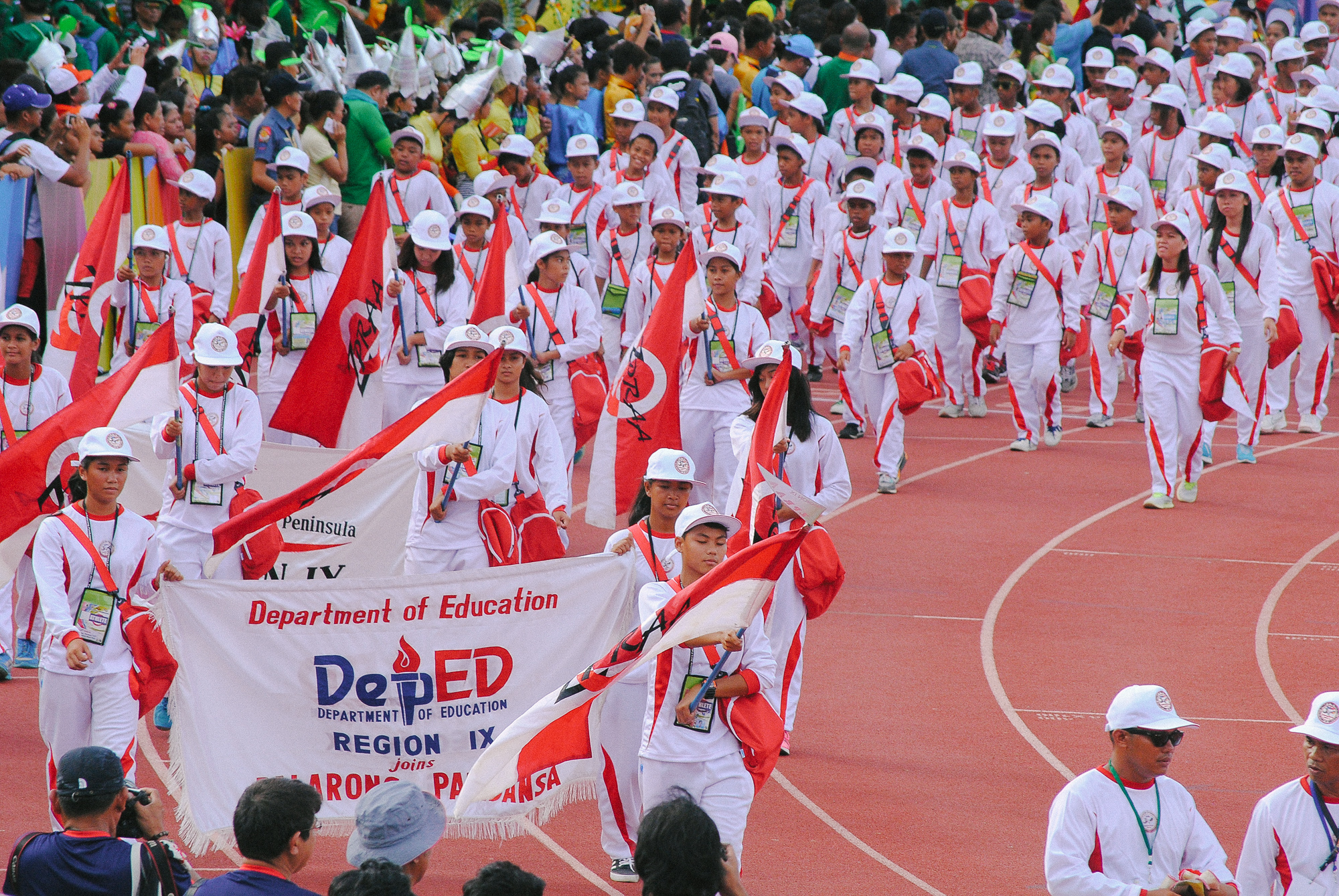
Zamboanga Peninsula

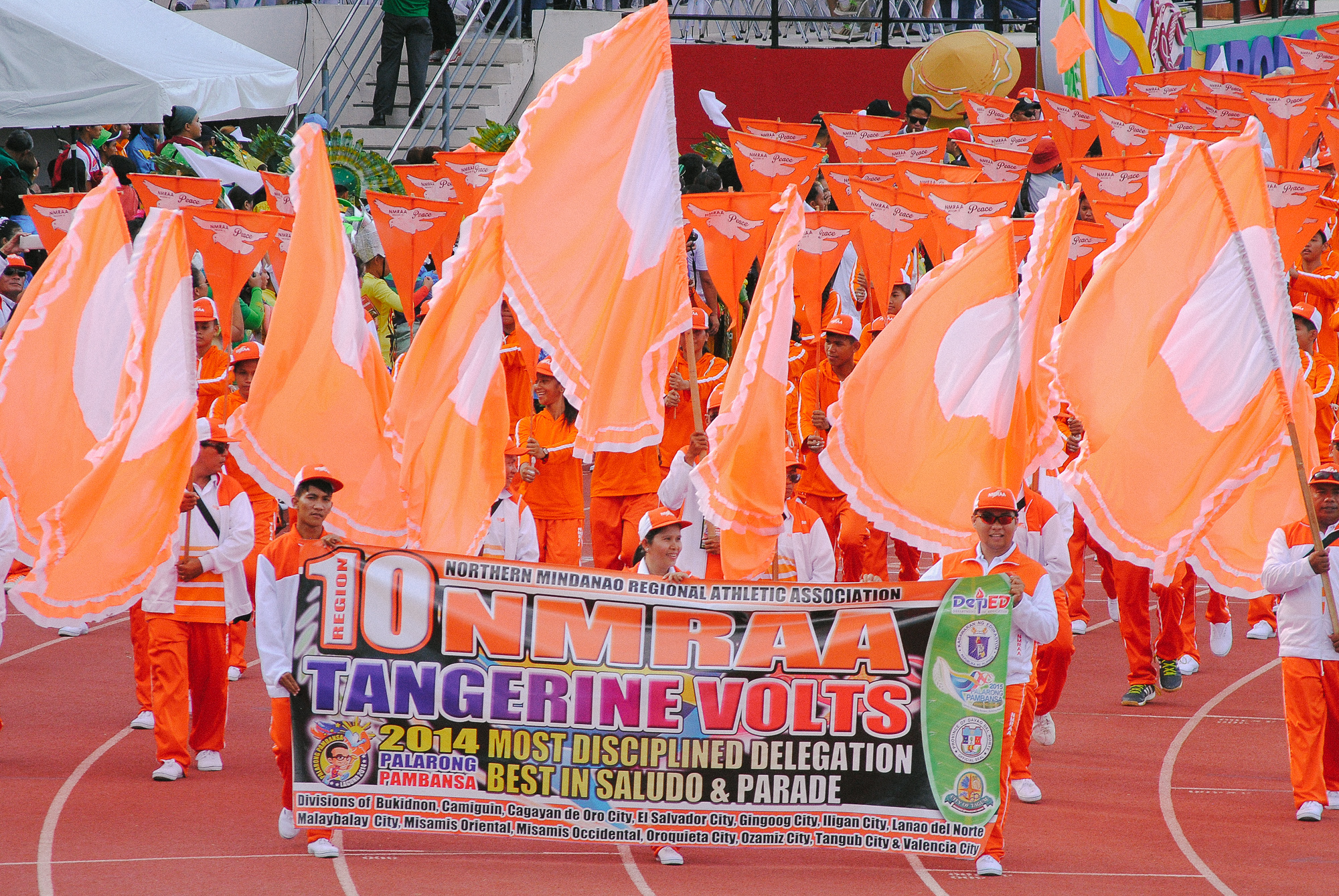
Northern Mindanao

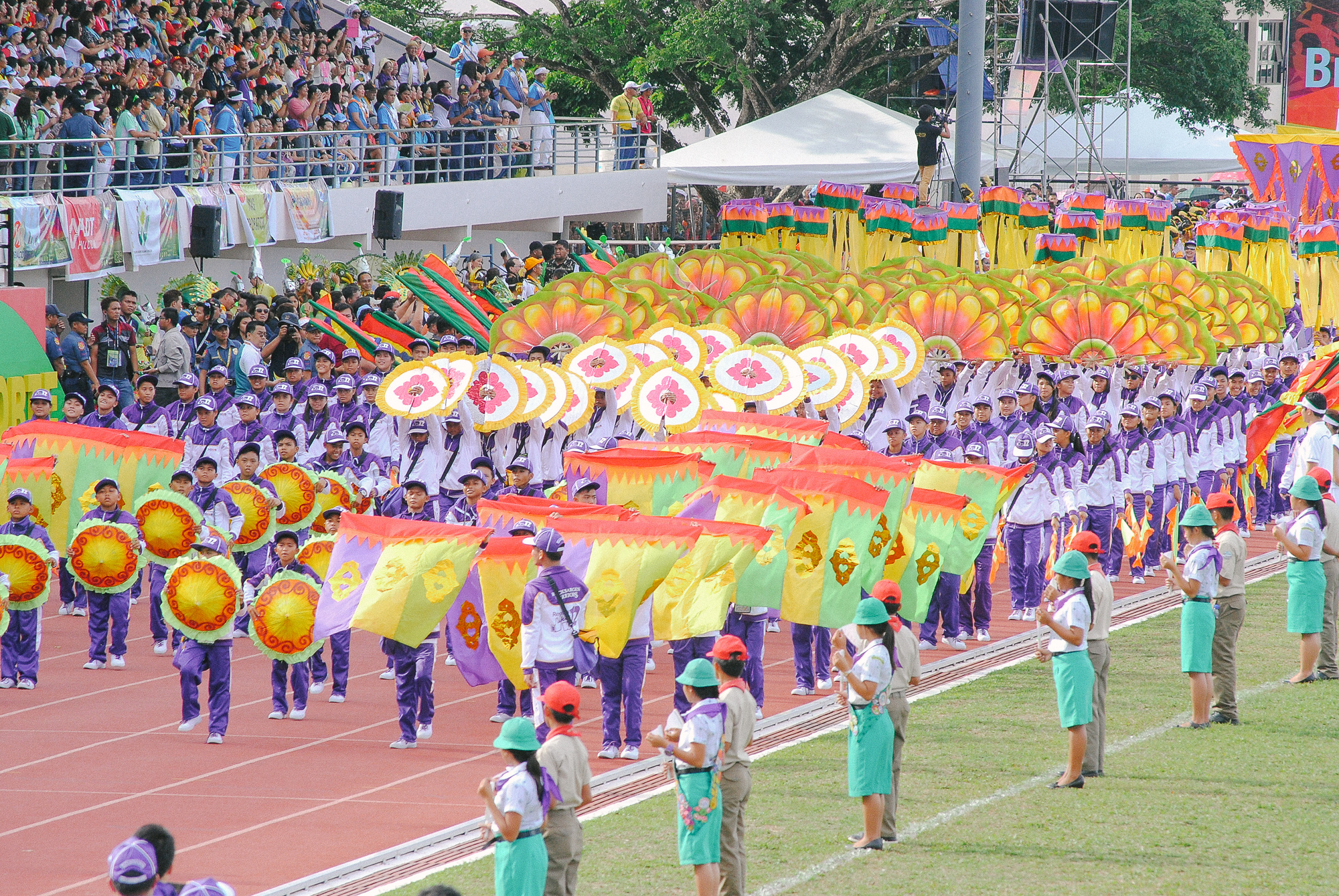
Soccsksargen

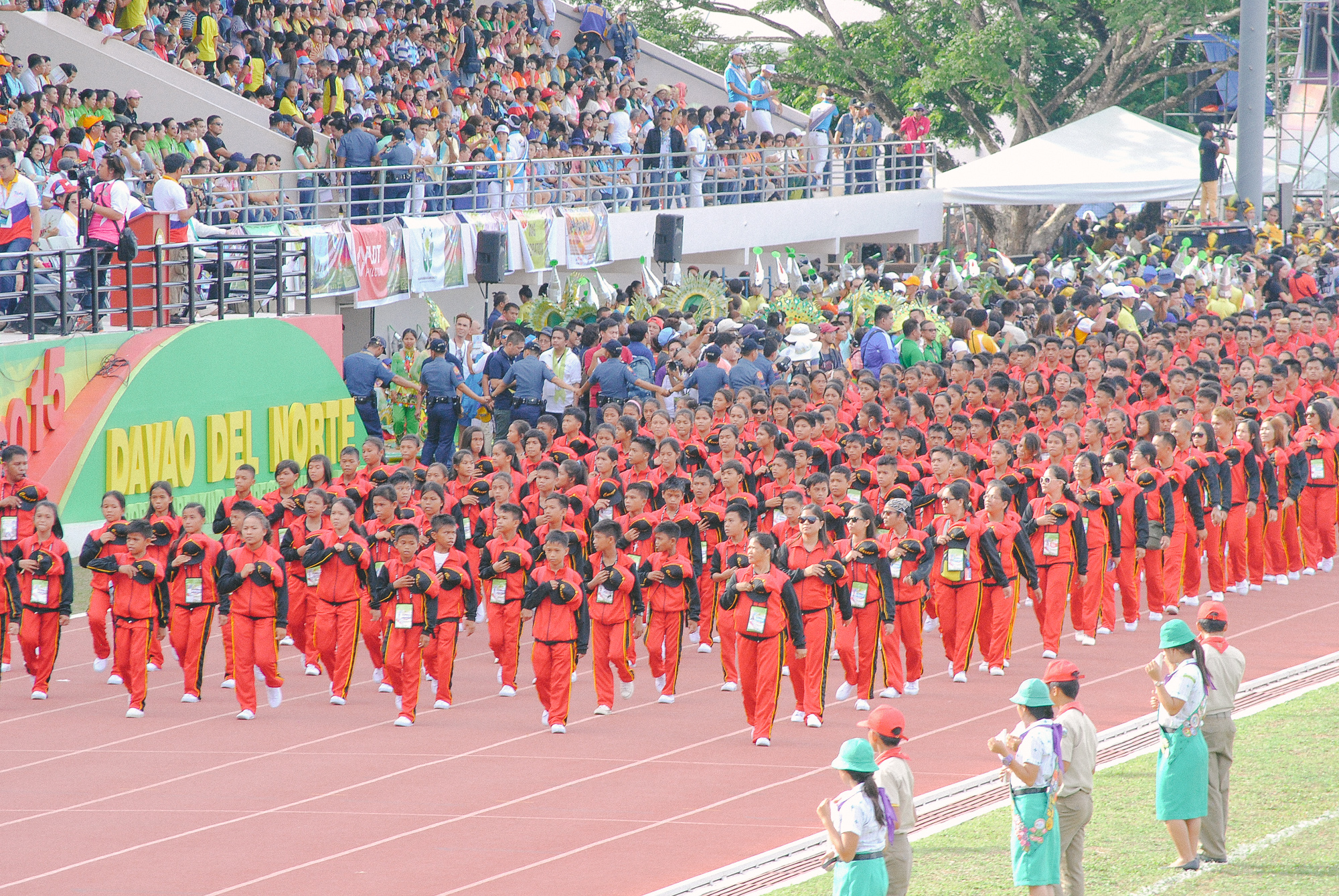
Caraga

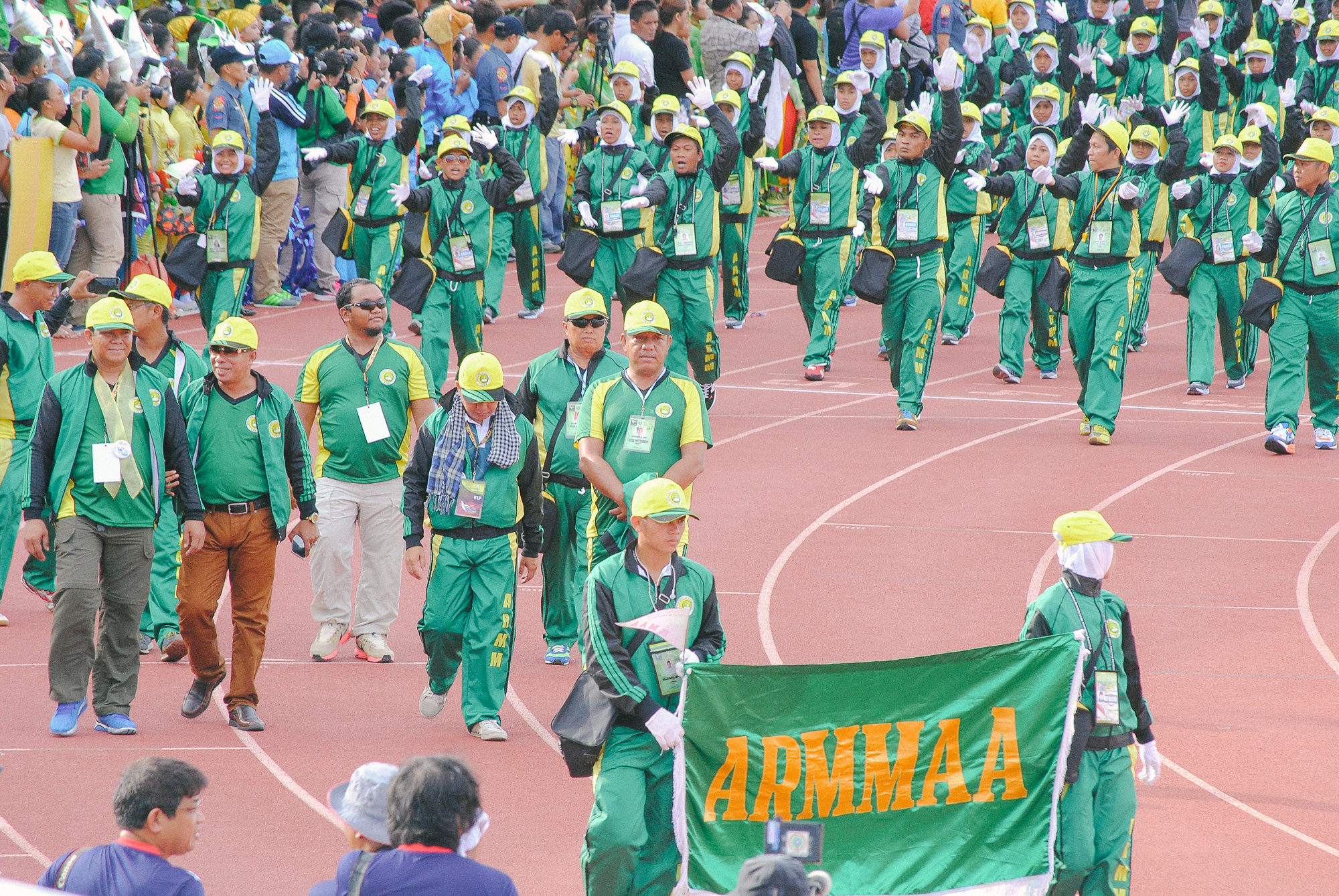
Autonomous Region in Muslim Mindanao

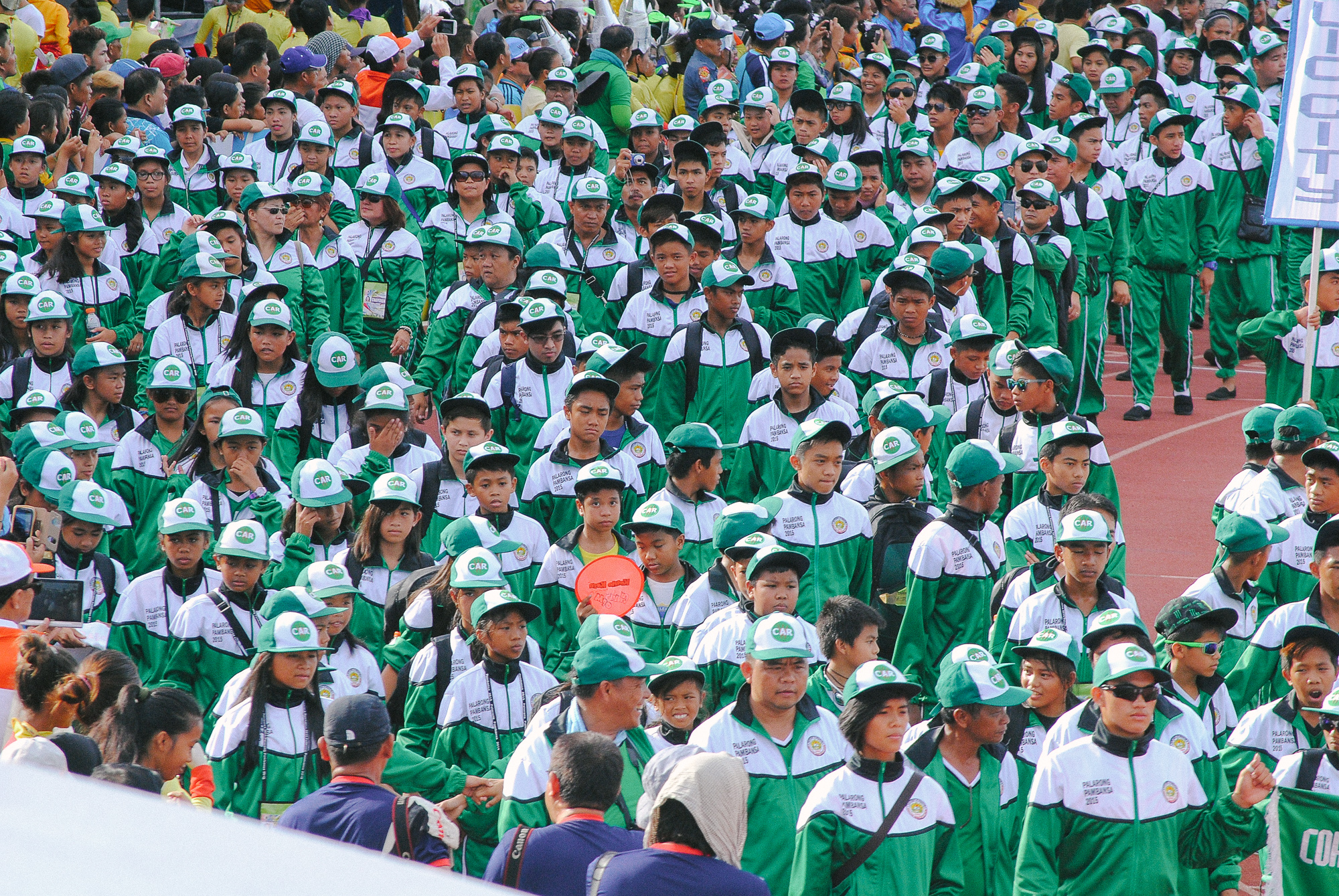
Cordillera Administrative Region

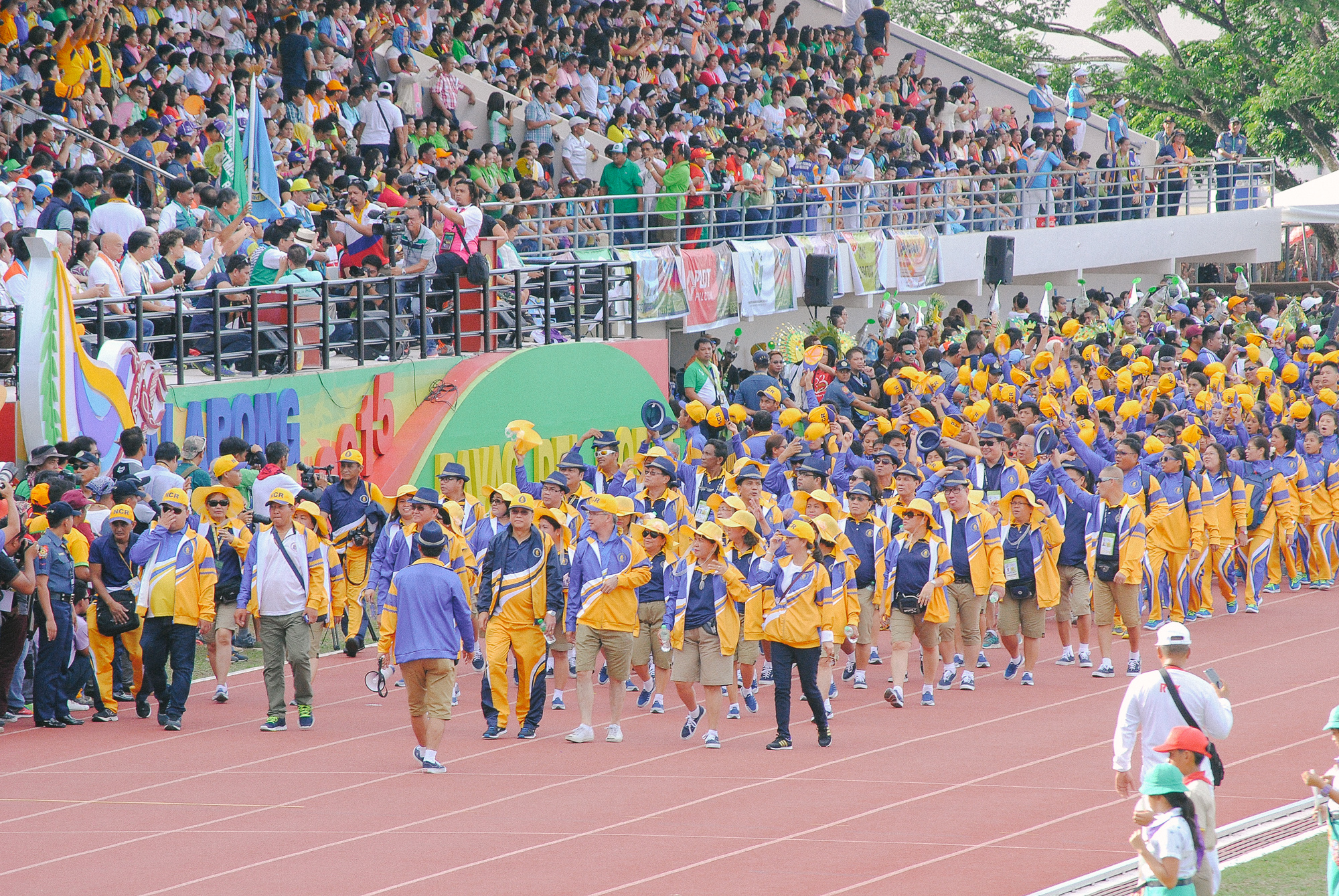
National Capital Region

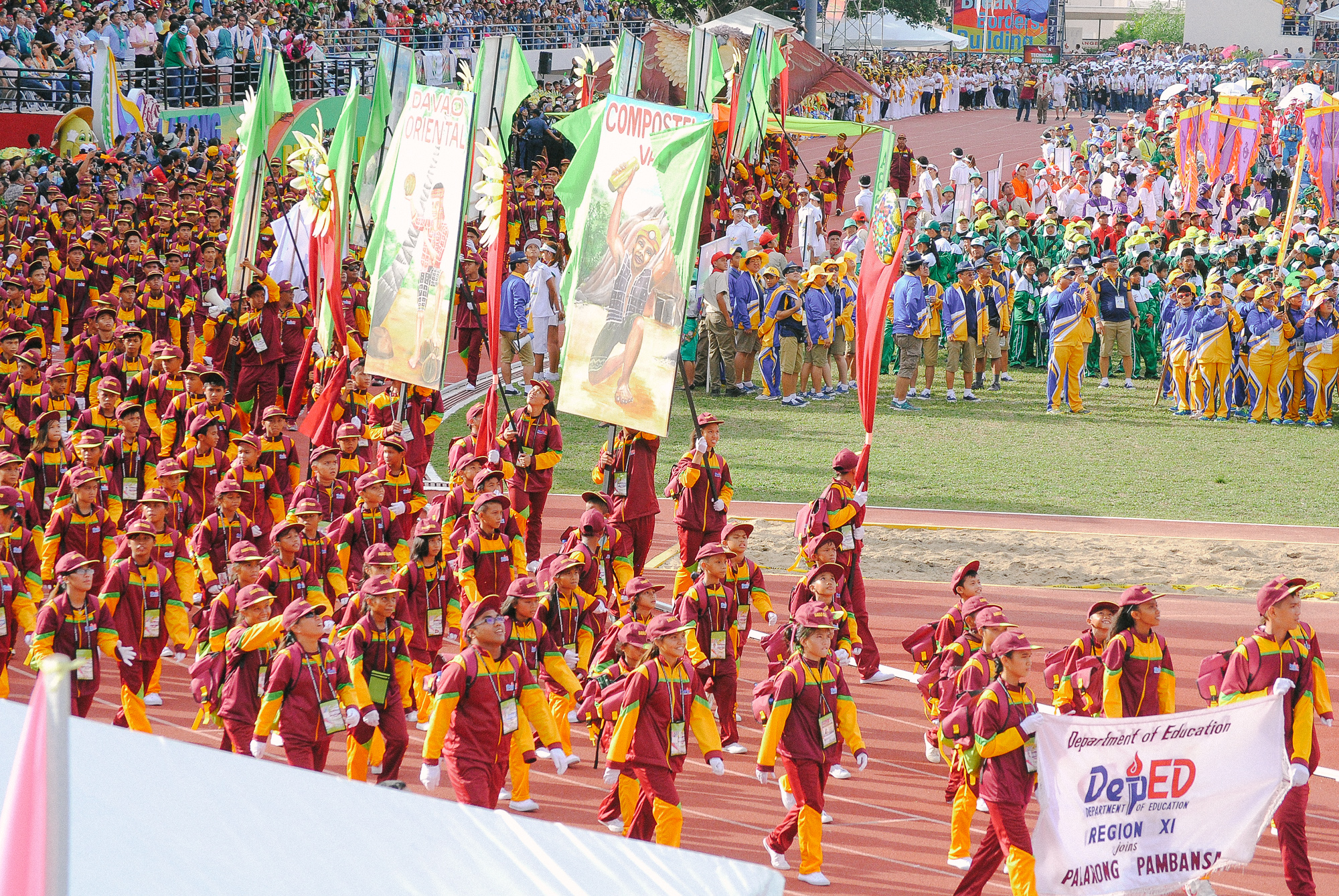
Davao

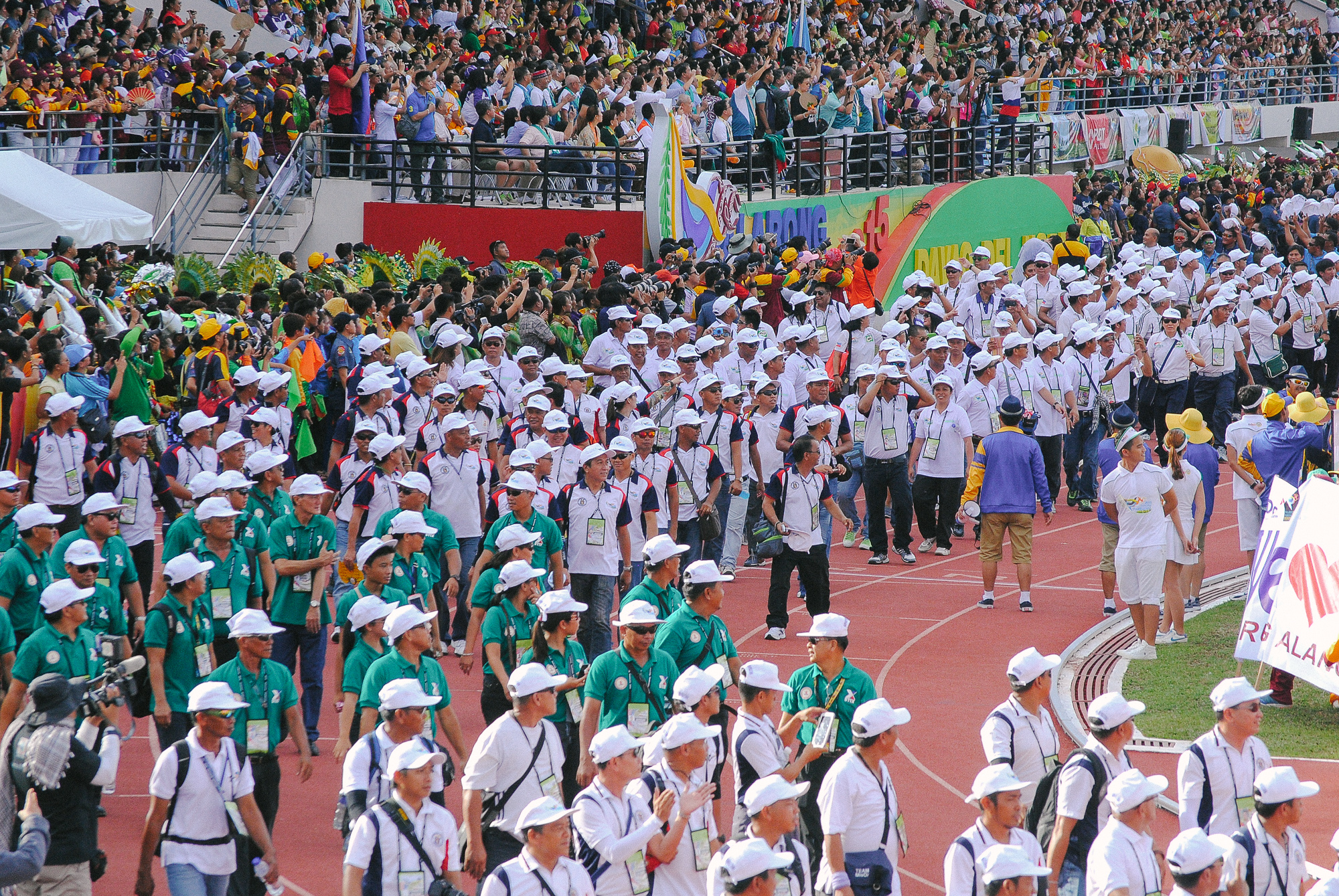
Technical Officials

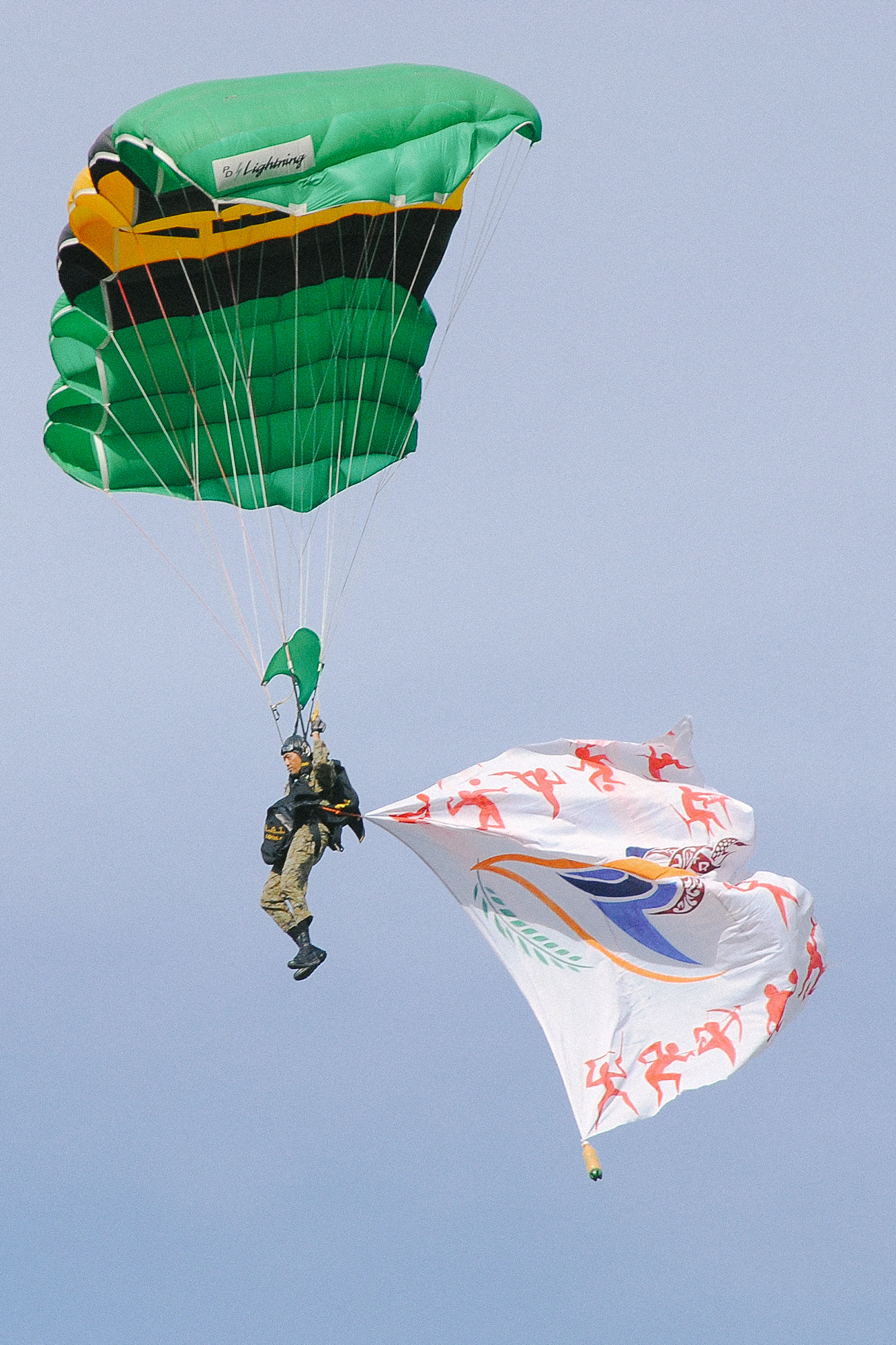
Paratroopers from the Armed Forces of the Philippines performing an aerial paradrop.

=== Sports ===
==== Regular and Demonstration Games ====
17 sports plus five demonstration sports will be contested at the 2015 Palarong Pambansa. Beach volleyball was included for the first time in the Palaro as a demonstration event.

- Archery
- Arnis
- Aquatics
- Athletics (details)
- Badminton
- Baseball
- Billiards¹
- Basketball
- Beach Volleyball¹
- Boxing
- Chess
- Football (details)
- Futsal¹
- Gymnastics
- Sepak takraw
- Softball
- Table tennis
- Taekwondo
- Tennis
- Volleyball
- Wrestling¹
- Wushu¹

¹ – demonstration sports

==== Special Games ====
About 850 athletes with special needs (orthopedically-challenged, intellectually-challenged, and visually-impaired) participated at the Special Games in the disciplines of athletics, aquatics, goal ball and bocce. The athletics event featured the 100m, 200m, 400m, 4 × 100 m, shot put, running and standing long jump categories, while the aquatics event featured the 50m backstroke, breast stroke, and freestyle categories.

=== Closing ceremony ===
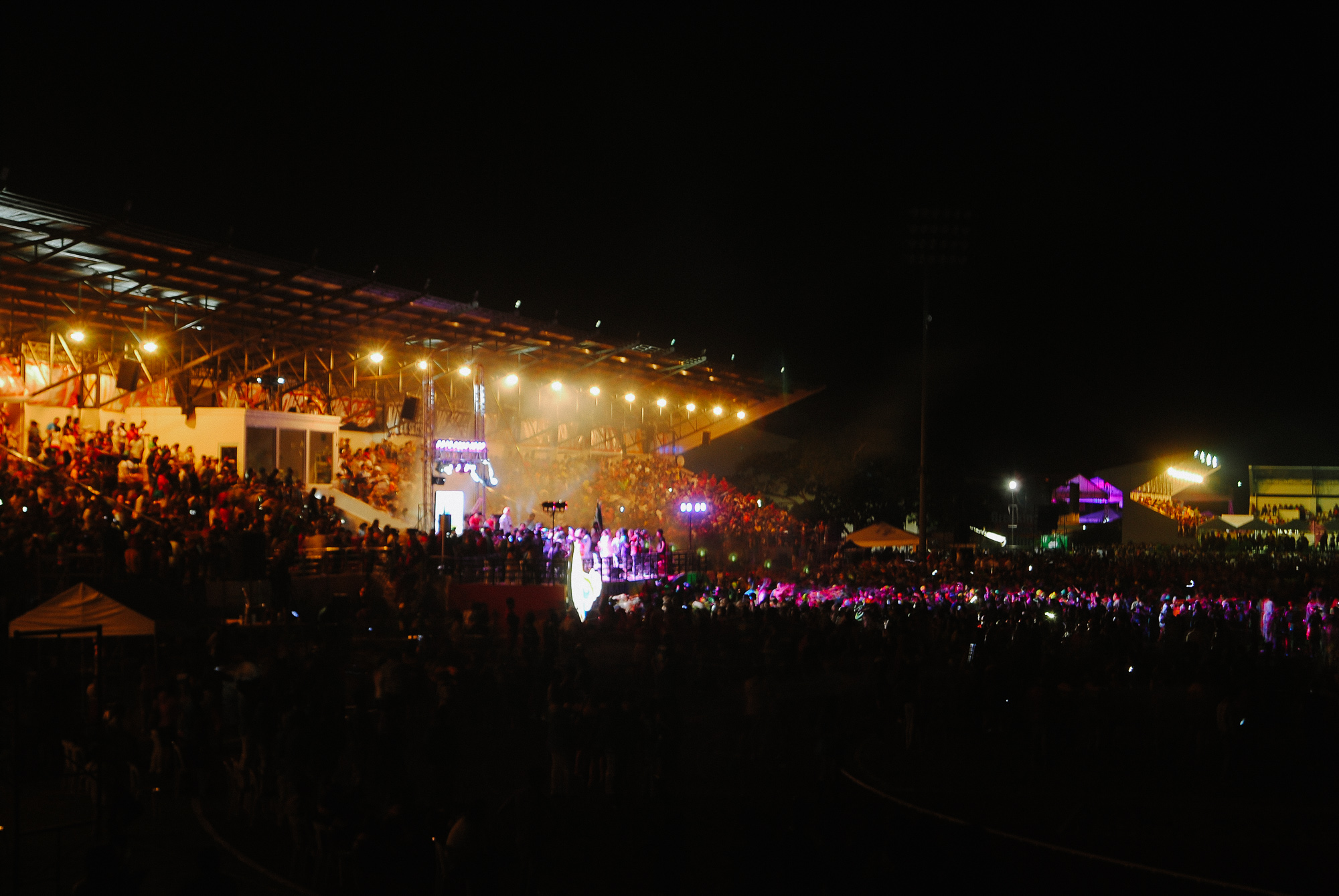
Delegates celebrated the Closing Ceremony with a rave party and pyromusical show at DNSTC.

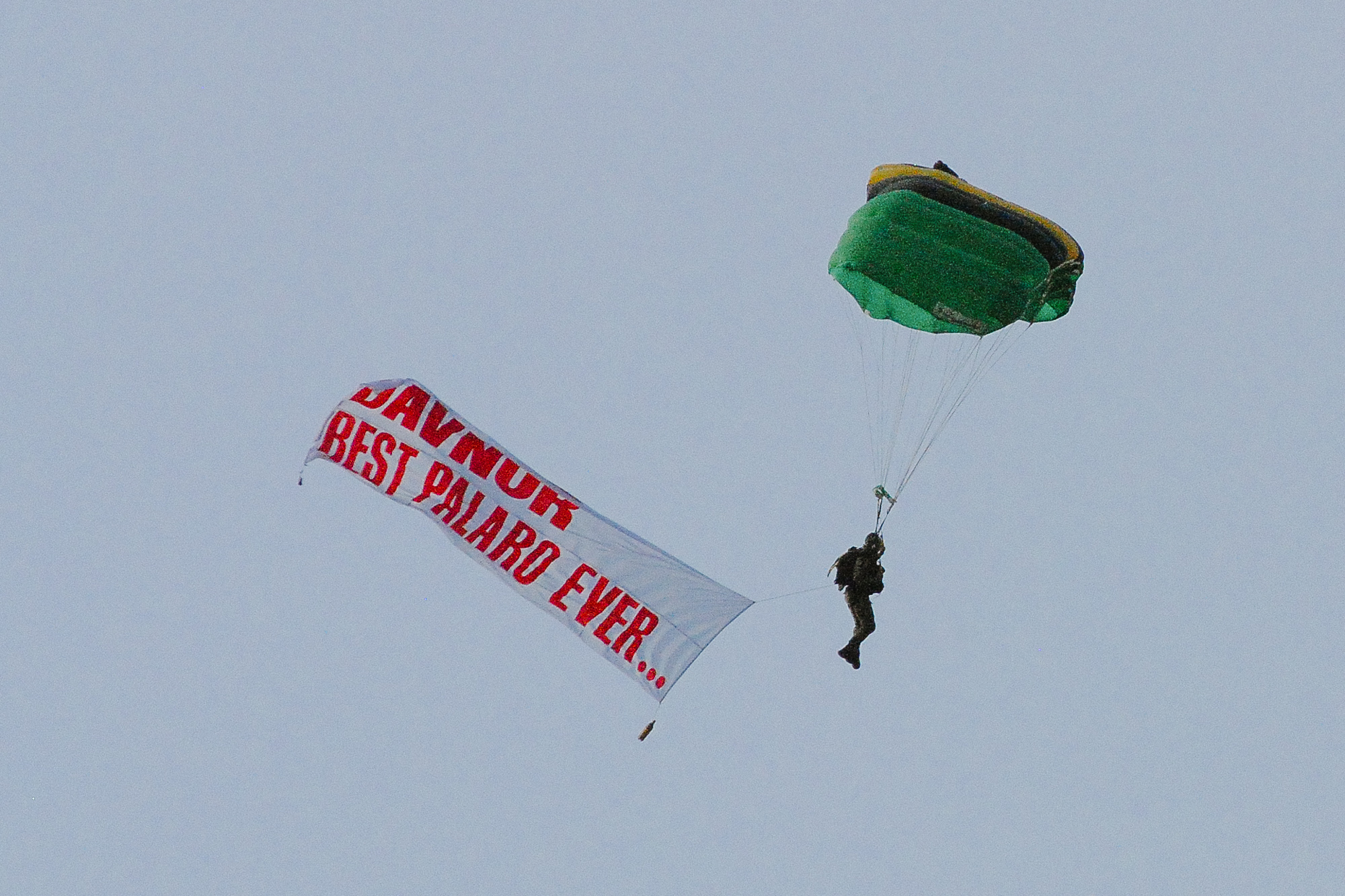
AFP Paratroopers perform a paradrop at DNSTC bringing banners reading "DavNor Best Palaro Ever," "Till We Meet Again," and "Maraming salamat po!"

The closing ceremony of the 2015 Palarong Pambansa was again held at the Davao del Norte Sports and Tourism Complex on 9 May, 3:00 PM PST. Fears of weather or black bug attacks were set aside as the organizers promoted it as the "Biggest, Grandest, and Wildest Closing Ceremony Ever." Many of the highlights during the opening ceremony were done once more as requested by Provincial Governor Rodolfo P. Del Rosario, who shared the general sentiment of the athletes and public that "bad weather and rice black bugs took away the glory during the opening program." As a way to entice delegates to stay until the closing ceremony, the province gave PHP50,000 to the delegation with the most number of participants during the closing ceremony; ARMMAA won this award with 388 delegates present during the Unity March.

The closing ceremony started with a Unity Parade around the track oval, as delegates paraded down the track oval with words of thanksgiving and appreciation. They were then grouped not according to their region but to their sport. The Armed Forces of the Philippines paratroopers did another exhibition paradrop during the ceremony, carrying banners that read "DavNor Best Palaro Ever," "Till We Meet Again," and "Maraming salamat po!"

Messages of commitment and thanksgiving were rendered by Department of Education Assistant Undersecretary Tonisito Umali, Philippine Sports Commission chairman Ricardo Garcia (represented by Commissioner Jose Luis "Jolly" Gomez), and representative Anthony del Rosario of the First District of Davao del Norte (who also spoke in behalf of Representative Anton Lagdameo, Jr. of the Second District of Davao del Norte). All speakers shared the same sentiment: the Province of Davao del Norte has indeed hosted the "best Palaro ever." Rep. del Rosario added that the House Bill No. 2393, an act for the establishment of the Davao Sports Academy, has reached the Senate Committee on Sports and will be deliberated shortly, adding that DNSTC "will become the most active sports complex in the country," even after it successfully hosted many of the Palarong Pambansa events. Commissioner Gomez even declared that Davao del Norte and DNSTC is capable of hosting the Southeast Asian Games already, and Undersecretary Umali quoted that the province also hosted the "best Palaro closing ceremony ever" in his speech.

An audio-visual presentation featuring Palarong Pambansa athletes and coaches was presented; in it they gave their reviews, remarks, and utmost appreciation about Davao del Norte's hosting, confirming that the province indeed hosted "the best Palaro ever" throughout all the years that they competed in the games. One of the interviewees, a volleyball coach from ARMMAA, emphasized that this was the first Palaro games where coaches and transportation managers did not fight over the use of the jeepneys and other vehicles over their transportation needs.

The closing ceremony culminated with the extinguishing of the 2015 Palarong Pambansa ceremonial flame by the Bureau of Fire Protection Unified Fire Marshals, a message of thanksgiving from the Provincial Governor Rodolfo P. Del Rosario, and the repeat performance of the mass field demonstration by selected students and teachers of Davao del Norte, which was immediately followed by a pyromusical show and rave party at DNSTC Football Pitch A featuring guest DJs from Davao City, as the Unified Fire Marshals provided two fire engines to soak the athletes wet as they partied.

The overall champion region for the 2015 Palarong Pambansa remains to be the National Capital Region Athletic Association, now on its 11th year. Southern Tagalog - Calabarzon Athletic Association came second and the Western Visayas Regional Athletic Association finished in third place. The Davao Regional Athletic Association, hosts of this years' Palarong Pambansa, finished in ninth place.

== Medals ==
All 17 regions have won at least one gold medal during the 2015 Palarong Pambansa, including regions who have not won any gold medal in the 2014 Palarong Pambansa such as Zamboanga Peninsula, Mimaropa, Ilocos, and Caraga. This makes it one of the most-awarded Palaro games in history.

Driven by the support of the massive home crowd, DavRAA aimed to finish in fifth place, three places from last year's eight, but it has only bagged 13 gold medals, 23 silver medals, and 30 bronze medals in all regular games, ranking ninth for this year; DavRAA did finish with a medal tally of 4G-4S-9B for Demonstration Games (fourth place), and 11G-6S-6B for Special Games (third place). On the other hand, NCRAA dominated the medal tally in regular games with 98 gold medals, 67 silver medals, and 71 bronze medals, followed by archrivals STCAA (51G-41S-49B) and WVRAA (42G-48S-41B).

WVRAA, CARAA, and RIAA had the most medals in the Demonstration Games, while WVRAA, STCAA, and DavRAA led the Special Games medal tally.

=== Regular Games ===
Final and official result as of May 9, 2015, 13:30 PST (UTC+8)

Rank	Region	Gold	Silver	Bronze	Total
1	NCRAA	98	67	71	236
2	STCAA	51	41	49	141
3	WVRAA	42	48	41	131
4	CARAA	24	22	16	62
5	NMRAA	19	14	39	72
6	CVRAA	18	29	29	76
7	CLRAA	17	10	21	48
8	SRAA	13	24	28	65
9	DavRAA	13	23	30	66
10	BRAA	9	14	19	42
11	EVRAA	6	3	9	18
12	CaVRAA	4	8	10	22
13	MRAA	4	5	7	16
14	ARMMAA	3	2	5	10
15	CARAGARAA	2	7	4	13
16	ZPRAA	2	6	9	17
17	RIAA	2	4	24	30
Totals (17 entries)		327	327	411	1,065

=== Demonstration Sports ===
Final and official result as of May 9, 2015, 12:00 PST (UTC+8)

* Host nation ( DavRAA)

Rank	Region	Gold	Silver	Bronze	Total
1	WVRAA	7	4	2	13
2	CARAA	6	6	3	15
3	RIAA	5	2	4	11
4	DavRAA*	4	4	9	17
5	CVRAA	3	5	3	11
6	BRAA	2	5	4	11
7	SRAA	2	1	0	3
8	CLRAA	2	0	3	5
8	NCRAA	2	0	3	5
10	EVRAA	1	3	10	14
11	NMRAA	1	2	1	4
12	CaVRAA	1	0	1	2
13	ZPRAA	0	4	2	6
14	ARMMAA	0	1	2	3
15	MRAA	0	0	2	2
16	STCAA	0	0	1	1
17	CARAGARAA	0	0	0	0
Totals (17 entries)		36	37	50	123

=== Special Games ===
Final and official result as of May 9, 2015 12:00 PST (UTC+8)

* Host nation ( DavRAA)

Rank	Region	Gold	Silver	Bronze	Total
1	WVRAA	13	10	8	31
2	STCAA	12	10	9	31
3	DavRAA*	11	6	6	23
4	RIAA	10	7	4	21
5	NCRAA	6	16	11	33
6	ZPRAA	6	1	2	9
7	CLRAA	4	1	0	5
8	CARAA	3	0	4	7
9	CVRAA	2	2	0	4
10	MRAA	2	1	1	4
11	NMRAA	1	2	3	6
12	CARAGARAA	1	0	3	4
13	BRAA	0	3	2	5
14	CaVRAA	0	2	1	3
15	EVRAA	0	0	0	0
15	SRAA	0	0	0	0
15	ARMMAA	0	0	0	0
Totals (17 entries)		71	61	54	186

== Special awards ==
Special awards were given by the Department of Education and the Provincial Government of Davao del Norte. Cash prizes amounting from PHP10,000 to PHP30,000 for the Most Disciplined Region, Most Organized Region, Best Billeting Center, and Cleanest and Greenest Billeting Center awards were awarded by DepEd, and the cash prizes (from PHP10,000 to PHP50,000) for the Biggest Delegation award was provided by the Provincial Government.

Most Disciplined Delegation
Rank	Regional Delegation
1st	DavRAA
2nd	STCAA
3rd	NMRAA

Most Organized Delegation
Rank	Regional Delegation
1st	MRAA
2nd	SRAA
3rd	DavRAA

Best Billeting Center
Rank	Regional Delegation	Billeting Center
1st	SRAA	Tagum City National High School
2nd	MRAA	Sto. Tomas Central Elementary School
3rd	STCAA	Rizal Elementary School

Cleanest and Greenest Billeting Center
Rank	Regional Delegation	Billeting Center
1st	MRAA	Sto. Tomas Central Elementary School
2nd	SRAA	Tagum City National High School
3rd	STCAA	Rizal Elementary School

Biggest Delegation present during the closing ceremony
Rank	Regional Delegation	Number of participants
1st	ARMMAA	388
2nd	CARAA	370
3rd	ZPRAA	309
4th	CARAGARAA	280
5th	BRAA	273

== Records broken ==
The 2015 Palarong Pambansa saw a number of records (17) broken in the fields of athletics (2) and swimming (15), making it also one of the games with the most number of previous records broken and established. Some athletes broke their own previous records, while some broke the existing record twice (in preliminary and final rounds).

2015 Palarong Pambansa Record-breaking feats
Event	Previous Record	Previous Record Holder	Year Established	New Record	New Record Holder
Athletics
Triple Jump (Secondary - Boys)	14.44	Mark Harry Diones	2010	15.01	Martin James Esteban (CLRAA)
800-meter run (Secondary - Girls)	2:17.2	Angelica de Josef	2014	2:12.27	Jie Ann Calis (NMRAA)
Swimming
50-meter backstroke (Elementary - Boys)	0:30.93	Christen Mercado		0:29.64	Seth Isaak Martin (NCRAA)
100-meter butterfly (Secondary - Girls)	1:05.79	Regina Maria Castrillo (NCRAA)		1:04.45	Regina Maria Castrilllo (STCAA)
200-meter freestyle (Elementary - Girls)	1:59.85	NCRAA		1:59.73	Althea Baluyot (NCRAA); Chloe Anne Fabic (NCRAA); Samantha Coronel (NCRAA); Kara Mendoza (NCRAA)
200-meter event (Elementary - Girls)	2:37.16	Regina Erin Castrillo (NCRAA)		2:34.76 (preliminary event); 2:33.71 (finals event)	Raven Faith Alcoseba (CVRAA)
100-meter freestyle (Elementary - Girls)	1:03.03	Imee Joyce Saavedra		1:02.28	Jules Katherine Ong (NCRAA)
400-meter medley rally (Elementary - Boys)		NCRAA		4:41.55	NCRAA
400-meter medley rally (Secondary - Boys)		NCRAA		4:07.00	NCRAA
100-meter individual freestyle (Elementary - Girls)	1:03.03			1:02.28; 1.02:76	Jules Katherine Ong (NCRAA); Althea Baluyot (NCRAA)
200-meter LC individual medley (Elementary - Girls)	2:34.76			2:33.71; 2:34.07	Raven Faith Alcoseba (CVRAA); Zoe Marie Hilario (DavRAA)
Reference: CNN Philippines

== Concerns ==
Despite the massive preparation done by the Provincial Government to the lead-up of the Palarong Pambansa hosting, problems arose during the conduct of the games.

=== Weather ===
As this year's Palarong Pambansa is being held in the middle of the summer season, intense heat and humidity pose a major challenge for the athletes and visitors. Aware of the potential effects of the hot weather on the athletes, the Department of Education has continued to ban some outdoor sports from 11:00 AM to 3:00 PM so the athletes would not suffer from heat stroke under the scorching summer sun.

According to Provincial Health Officer Dr. Agapito Hornido, head of the Palaro Medical Team, said the young players are at risk in high temperatures, as they push themselves harder to increase their chances of clinching a medal. The Palaro Medical Team assured the participants and the public that they are geared up to respond to weather-related health concerns such as heat exhaustion and stroke. Hornido said they have already attended to dozens of athletes, with most of them showing signs of heat exhaustion. Some even fainted during intense training. He revealed the medical team is bolstered up by the 21-bed Palaro Medical Operations Center (MOC), which offers free consultation, medicines, minor treatment, ECG, physio-therapy, dental and other services. In addition, the Diocese of Tagum through the Caritas Manila Foundation, the Armed Forces of the Philippines, City Government of Davao Emergency Medical Services, and several municipal emergency services provide first aid and medical support services for the athletes and public, and have dedicated mobile emergency stations, triage centers, and ambulances within the venues and billeting centers.

Ambulent vendors registered as exhibitors and stalls were well-prepared and kept more stock of bottled mineral water, energy drinks, soft drinks, and other beverages in supply. Many also sold sun visors, caps, sunglasses, and fans.

On the other hand, a sudden downpour of heavy rain affected the conduct of the opening ceremonies on 4 May, thus prompting some parts of the program to be omitted or shortened.

=== Rice black bug attack ===
At least thousands of rice black bugs (Scotinophara coarctata) swarmed the DNSTC on the first day of competitions, 3 May. It was first observed during the late finish of the athletics competition, when the floodlight towers were turned on for the night events, as thousands of black bugs came swarming to the lights. At the same time, the Provincial Government was holding a welcome dinner for delegation officials (Governor's Night) at the RDR Gymnasium and Aquatic Center of the DNSTC when the black bugs swarmed the floodlights and landed on the swimming pool and food intended for the guests; the event was cut short as a result. According to witness accounts, the black bugs also landed on the pavement in and around the main grandstand, thus making it slippery.

The black bugs, known as piyangaw in the Cebuano language, emit a sharply foul odor that affects breathing, causes excessive tearing in the eyes, and may also cause stomachache when accidentally swallowed. Their invasion was attributed to the bright lights of DNSTC and its location adjacent to rice fields and to a mini-forest, and because of their abundance during the full moon.

In response to this, Davao del Norte' assistant provincial administrator Sofonias P. Gabonda Jr. said they immediately had a meeting on that same night to address the issue and insisted that the bugs are harmless and do not pose a significant health threat to the athletes or to the public. He also said that they will just adjust the intensity and duration of turning on the floodlights during sporting events to avoid a similar incident. Most importantly, the lights at the Aquatic Center will be turned off during the night, as swimmers might accidentally ingest the black bugs during their swim. DepEd Assistant Secretary for Legal and Legislative Affairs Tonisito Umali said that they have already installed insect-repelling screens in all billeting venues so as to prevent the bugs from pestering the athletes and coaches.

On 4 May, a massive clean-up was done by maintenance crews, and it was only then that the scale of the invasion was realized: at least two dump trucks were needed just to deliver the collected bodies of dead black bugs away from DNSTC. Still, the black bug invasion of DNSTC continued throughout the duration of the Palaro, but their numbers have significantly decreased. No health-related cases were reported and no schedule games were postponed due to the black bug invasion. During the closing ceremony, no more rice black bugs were seen around DNSTC or in the billeting centers.

=== Bullying of athletes ===
Several cases of verbal bullying were reported by several athletes and coaches to the Department of Education, and reports showed that parents of some athletes had been observed to have bullied some athletes especially those who were competing against their children. Though Umali said that these incidents could have been the result of parents overreacting to the situation, he readily declared that physical and verbal abuses are banned in the Palaro, adding that DepEd could discipline the athlete and its staff, including those under private schools.

=== Other incidents ===
On 17 April, a few weeks before the start of the 2015 Palarong Pambansa, three gymnasts from the Davao Regional Athletic Association (DavRAA), namely Brian Albert Buhian, Janliver Estabaya (both from Sinawilan National High School, Davao del Sur), and Louie Villacorte, Jr. (of Sta. Ana National High School, Davao City), returned to the Department of Education Division Office of Davao del Norte a bundle of cash that they found under the bench of a kiosk at Tagum City National Comprehensive High School (the billeting center for DavRAA delegates) after buying personal necessities outside TCNCHS. The cash, which amount to P50,000, was earmarked as allowance for their fellow DavRAA athletes from Panabo City and Davao del Norte. According to Buhian, he was perturbed and felt the urge to return the large amount of money to its rightful owner, even though no one was around at that time. The group was later awarded with a resolution in the Sangguniang Panlalawigan (Provincial Council) of Davao del Norte filed by Board Member Atty. Raymond Joey Millan commending them for their integrity; monetary incentive was also given to the three athletes through donations given by the board members. They were also given one by one a tablet PC and framed copies of the said resolution during the closing ceremony of the Palaro.
