= 2025 Palarong Pambansa =

Philippine multi-sport event

65th Palarong Pambansa
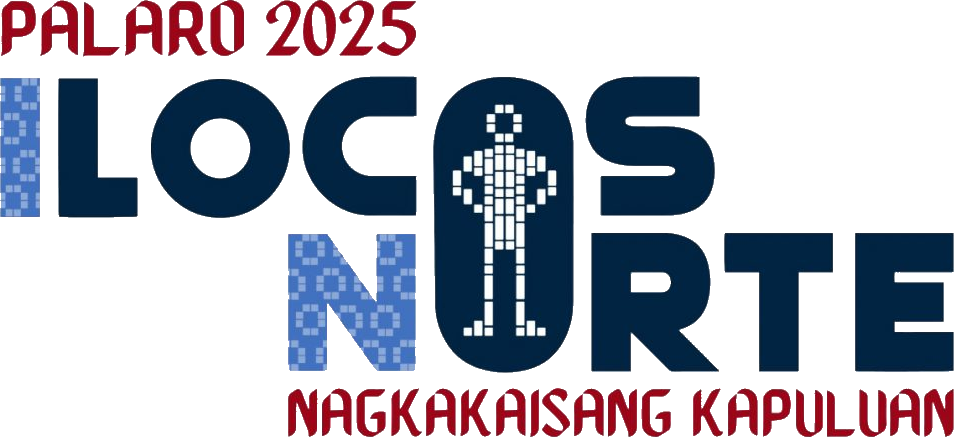
- Logo
- Host city: Laoag, Ilocos Norte
- Country: Philippines
- Motto: "Nagkakaisang Kapuluan" (United Archipelago)
- Teams: 19 teams (17 regional athletic associations, and two other delegations)
- Athletes: 14,685
- Sport: 27
- Opening: May 24, 2025
- Closing: May 31, 2025
- Opened by: President Bongbong Marcos
- Closed by: DepEd Secretary Sonny Angara
- Athlete's Oath: Gerick Jhon Flores
- Judge's Oath: Hidilyn Diaz
- Torch lighter: Roger Tapia
- Main venue: Marcos Stadium
- Broadcast partner: One Sports
- Website: palaro.ilocosnorte.ph

The 2025 Palarong Pambansa, officially known as the 65th Palarong Pambansa, was a multi-sport event held in Laoag, Ilocos Norte in 2025. Student-athletes from 20 athletic associations consisting the 17 regions of the Philippines, the National Academy of Sports, and the Philippine Schools Overseas competed in different sporting events and disciplines.

The National Capital Region was the eighteenth straight general champions.

== Hosting ==
The Ilocos Norte was confirmed to be the host the 2025 Palarong Pambansa as early as 2023.

== Venues ==
Marcos Stadium, the opening ceremony venue of the games

The following are the playing venues for the games.

Municipality	Venue	Event
Bacarra	Bacarra National Comprehensive High School Grounds	Baseball
Bacarra	Bacarra USA National Cultural Center	Gymnastics
Bacarra	PCV Socio Civic and Cultural Center	Volleyball
Batac	MMSU Student Center	Billiards
Batac	MMSU Library Center for Flexible Learning	Chess
Batac	MMSU Teatro Ilocandia	Taekwondo
Batac	MMSU Gymnasium	Volleyball
Batac	MMSU Football Field	Football
Burgos	Burgos Military Grounds	Football
Dingras	Dingras Municipal Grounds	Football
Dingras	Dingras Civic Center	Volleyball
Laoag	Ilocos Norte Centennial Arena	Basketball, closing ceremony
Laoag	Laoag City Amphitheater	Basketball
Laoag	SM City Laoag East Wing Parking Lot	Basketball
Laoag	St. Mary's Seminary Covered Court	Bocce
Laoag	Divine Word College of Laoag Covered Court	Futsal
Laoag	Ilocos Norte National High School Gymnasium	Gymnastics
Laoag	Marcos Stadium	Athletics, Football and opening ceremony
Laoag	Marcos Stadium Swimming Pool	Aquatics
Laoag	Marcos Stadium Tennis Court	Tennis
Laoag	Northwestern University Football Field	Football
Paoay	Plaza del Norte Hotel and Convention Center	Table Tennis
Pasuquin	Pasuquin Civic Center	Basketball
Pasuquin	Gabaldon Elementary School Grounds	Softball
Pasuquin	Ilocos Norte Agricultural College Open Grounds	Softball
Piddig	Piddig Farmers Training Center	Badminton
San Nicolas	F.E. Marcos Mini Cultural and Sports Center	Arnis
San Nicolas	Robinsons Ilocos	Dance Sport, Kickboxing and Penckak Silat
San Nicolas	Venvi Real State Open Ground	Archery
Sarrat	Sarrat Civic Center	Wushu
Vintar	Vintar Sports Complex	Baseball
Vintar	Vintar Civic Center	Gymnastics

== The Games ==
=== Opening ceremony ===
The opening of the games was held on May 24, 2025 at the Marcos Stadium in Laoag. It was opened by Philippine president Bongbong Marcos.

The event started with the "Parada ng mga Atleta" where all delegates participated in a parade along Rizal Street and Sirib Mile in Laoag. The main program was entitled Palakasan:Tales of Filipino Strength where cultural performances showcases the culture of Northern Luzon which includes the Biag ni Lam-ang, the Basi Revolt, and the feats of Ilocano swimmer Teófilo Yldefonso.

Olympic gold medalist and weightlifter Hidilyn Diaz led the oath of coaches and technical officials while youth baseball player Gerick Jhon Flores led the athlete's oath. The symbolic lighting of the Palarong Pambansa lightbeam featured various Filipino athletes namely: Jemmuelle James Espiritu (archery), Mark Anthony Domingo (athletics), Jesson Cid (decathlon), Roger Tapia (para-athletics), and Eric Ang (trap shooting).

=== Sports ===
As of 2025, there are total of 27 sports disciplines, including the para-games, demonstrations, and exhibition sports.

Weightlifting, last featured in the 1980s, returns to the Palarong Pambansa albeit as a demonstration sport.

Demonstration sports

- Dancesport
- Weightlifting

Exhibition sports

- Kickboxing

Parasports

- Athletics
- Bocce
- Goalball
- Swimming

Regular sports

- Archery
- Arnis
- Athletics
- Badminton
- Baseball
- Basketball
- Billiards
- Boxing
- Chess
- Football
- Futsal
- Gymnastics
  - Aerobics
  - Artistic
  - Rhythmic
- Pencak silat
- Sepak takraw
- Softball
- Swimming
- Table tennis
- Taekwondo
- Tennis
- Volleyball
- Wrestling
- Wushu

=== Closing ceremony ===
Ilocos Norte Centennial Arena, the closing ceremony venue of the games

The closing ceremony held on May 31, 2025 at the Ilocos Norte Centennial Arena in Laoag. 2025 Palarong Pambansa Ilocos Norte governor Matthew Manotoc hands over the Palarong Pambansa flag to the governor of the host province of the 2026 Palarong Pambansa, Santiago Cane Jr. of Agusan del Sur.

== Participating teams ==
Host Region

The Philippine Schools Overseas and National Academy of Sports also entered as a separate delegations.

Regions
Code	Name	Monicker	Colors
BARMMAA	Bangsamoro Autonomous Region in Muslim Mindanao	BARMM Sultans	
CARAA	Cordillera Administrative Region	Fearless Highlanders	
NCRAA	National Capital Region	NCR Metro Stars	
IRAA	Region I or Ilocos Region	Mighty Tamaraws	
CAVRAA	Region II or Cagayan Valley	Green Hawks	
CLRAA	Region III or Central Luzon	Central Luzon Patriots	
STCAA	Region IV-A or Southern Tagalog - Calabarzon	Calabarzon Heroes	
MRAA	Region IV-B or Southern Tagalog - Mimaropa	Mimaropa Tamaraws	
BRAA	Region V or Bicol Region	Bicol Vulcans	
WVRAA	Region VI or Western Visayas	The Champs Western Visayas	
CVRAA	Region VII Central Visayas	CViRAA Fighters	
EVRAA	Region VIII or Eastern Visayas	EV Troopers	
ZPRAA	Region IX or Zamboanga Peninsula	Zamboanga Peninsula Sharks	
NMRAA	Region X or Northern Mindanao	Northmin Stars	
DAVRAA	Region XI or Davao Region	Davao Eagles	
SRAA	Region XII or Soccsksargen	Soccsksargen Warriors	
CARAGARAA	Region XIII or Caraga	Caragold	
Other teams
Code	Name	Monicker	Colors
NAS	National Academy of Sports	NSA Excel Lions	
PSO	Association of Philippine Schools Overseas	—N/a	

== Calendar ==
OC	Opening ceremony	●	Event competitions	F/M	Finals/Medal events	CC	Closing ceremony

May 2025	24th Saturday	25th Sunday	26th Monday	27th Tuesday	28th Wednesday	29th Thursday	30th Friday	31st Saturday	Events
Ceremonies	OC							CC	—N/a
Regular, Demonstration^{1}, and Para^{2} Sports
Archery			●	●	●	●			4
Arnis		●	●	●	●	●	●		6
Athletics			●	●	●	●	●		5
Badminton			●	●	●	●	●		5
Baseball		●	●	●	●	●	●		6
Basketball		●	●	●	●	●	●		6
Billiards			●	●	●	●	●		5
Bocce			●	●	●	●			4
Boxing		●	●	●	●	●	●		6
Chess			●	●	●	●	●		5
Dancesport				●	●	●			3
Football	●	●	●	●	●	●	●	●	8
Futsal			●	●	●	●	●		5
Goalball			●	●	●	●			4
Gymnastics			●	●	●	●	●		5
Kickboxing			●	●	●	●			4
Pencak silat			●	●	●	●			4
Sepak takraw			●	●	●	●	●		5
Softball		●	●	●	●	●	●		6
Swimming				●	●	●	●		4
Table tennis		●	●	●	●	●	●		6
Taekwondo			●	●	●	●			4
Tennis		●	●	●	●	●	●		6
Volleyball		●	●	●	●	●	●		6
Weightlifting			●	●	●	●	●		5
Wrestling				●	●	●	●		4
Wushu			●	●	●	●			4

Source: 2025 Palarong Pambansa Schedule of Games

== Medal tally ==
=== Regular games ===
Rank	Region	Gold	Silver	Bronze	Total
1	National Capital Region (NCRAA)	117	70	50	237
2	Calabarzon (IV-A STCAA)	47	68	66	181
3	Western Visayas (VI-WVRAA)	44	54	58	156
4	Davao Region (XI-DavRAA)	43	28	36	107
5	Northern Mindanao (X-NMRAA)	31	26	46	103
6	Central Luzon (III-CLRAA)	29	25	36	90
7	Central Visayas (VII-CVIRAA)	25	32	52	109
8	Caraga (CARAGARAA)	21	20	43	84
9	Cordillera Administrative Region (CARAA)	17	13	11	41
10	Eastern Visayas (VIII-EVRAA)	16	17	21	54
11	Soccsksargen (XII-SRAA)	15	25	36	76
12	Ilocos Region (I-R1AA)*	13	16	27	56
13	Bicol Region (V-BRAA)	6	9	31	46
14	National Academy of Sports (NAS)	6	2	6	14
15	Cagayan Valley (II-CAVRAA)	4	11	18	33
16	Mimaropa (IV-B MRAA)	4	6	5	15
17	Zamboanga Peninsula (IX-ZPRAA)	3	17	14	34
18	Bangsamoro Autonomous Region (BARMAA)	2	3	5	10
Totals (18 entries)		443	442	561	1,446

Source: Palarong Pambansa 2025 Medal Tally Reporting System

=== Demonstration games ===
Rank	Region	Gold	Silver	Bronze	Total
1	Zamboanga Peninsula (IX-ZPRAA)	4	2	1	7
2	Calabarzon (IV-A STCAA)	3	4	1	8
3	Central Visayas (VII-CVIRAA)	3	3	0	6
4	Central Luzon (III-CLRAA)	0	1	0	1
5	National Capital Region (NCRAA)	0	0	7	7
6	Caraga (CARAGARAA)	0	0	1	1
7	Ilocos Region (I-R1AA)*	0	0	0	0
Totals (7 entries)		10	10	10	30

Source: Palarong Pambansa 2025 Medal Tally Reporting System

=== Para games ===
Rank	Region	Gold	Silver	Bronze	Total
1	Western Visayas (VI-WVRAA)	23	21	14	58
2	Calabarzon (IV-A STCAA)	13	16	10	39
3	Soccsksargen (XII-SRAA)	8	4	7	19
4	National Capital Region (NCRAA)	7	4	6	17
5	Davao Region (XI-DavRAA)	5	5	7	17
6	Bicol Region (V-BRAA)	4	5	0	9
7	Zamboanga Peninsula (IX-ZPRAA)	4	3	4	11
8	Ilocos Region (I-R1AA)*	3	1	8	12
9	Bangsamoro Autonomous Region (BARMAA)	3	1	1	5
10	Cagayan Valley (II-CAVRAA)	2	3	1	6
11	Central Luzon (III-CLRAA)	1	6	5	12
12	Eastern Visayas (VIII-EVRAA)	1	4	6	11
13	Central Visayas (VII-CVIRAA)	1	2	1	4
14	Caraga (CARAGARAA)	1	1	4	6
15	Northern Mindanao (X-NMRAA)	1	1	0	2
Totals (15 entries)		77	77	74	228

Source: Palarong Pambansa 2025 Medal Tally Reporting System

== Marketing ==
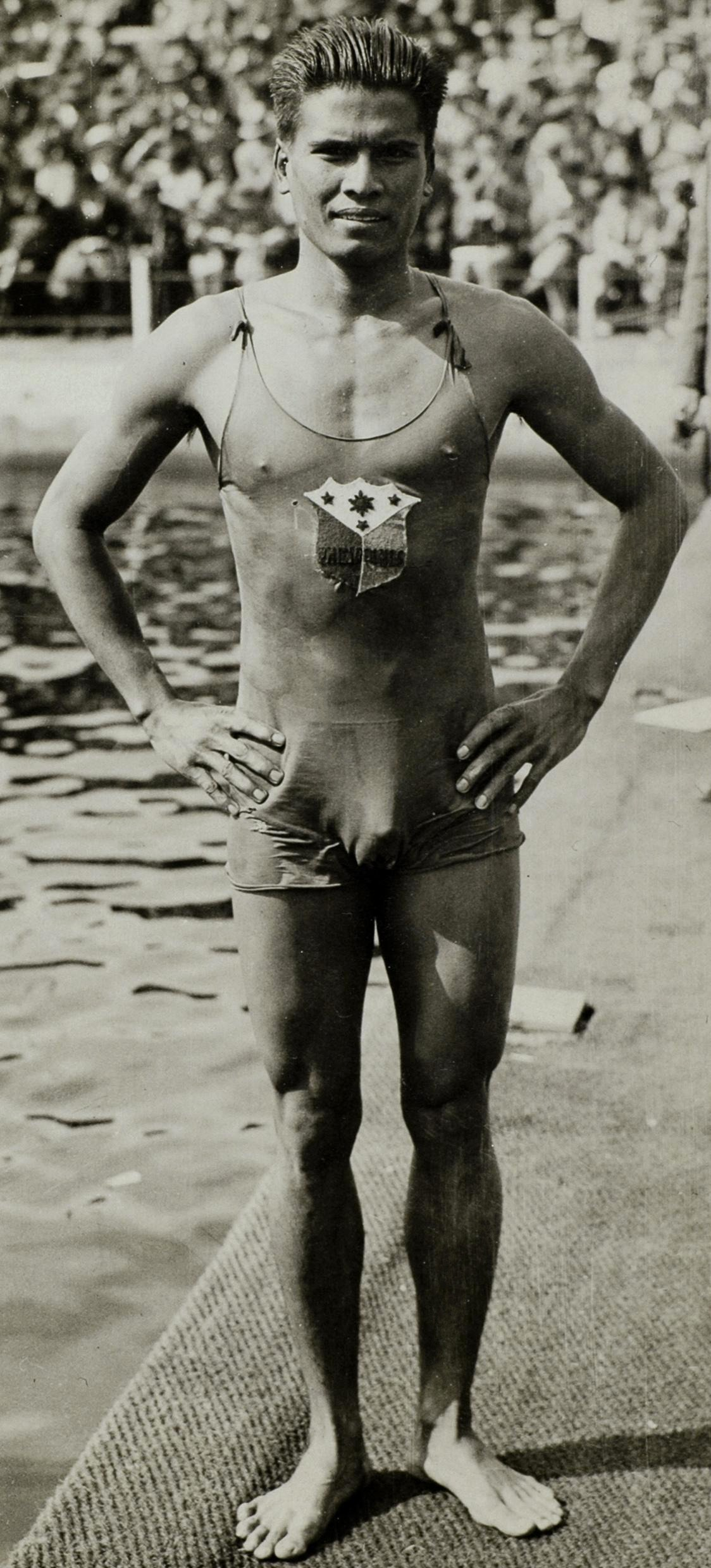
1928 photo of Teófilo Yldefonso which was the inspiration of the logo.

The logo for the 2025 Palarong Pambansa features the inabel weaving pattern and a "pixelated human figure" inspired from a photo of Teófilo Yldefonso, a swimmer who is the first Filipino Olympic medal winner and a native of Piddig.

The Office of the Governor of Ilocos Norte in partnership with the Philippine Postal Corporation launched a series of pre-paid postcards featuring scenic scenes of Ilocos Norte. The set of 5 postcards features scenes such as Saud Beach, the Burgos Windfarm, the Marcos Stadium, the Suba Sand Dunes, and the Kapurpurawan Rock Formation. The postcards are given for free at the event center and are also sold at the philatelic division of the Manila Central Post Office for ₱104 Philippine Pesos.

== Media coverage ==
On May 2, 2025, Cignal TV served as the official broadcaster for this tournament that aired on One Sports, One Sports+, Cignal Play and Pilipinas Live. This was also the first Palarong Pambansa to aired on Philippine television.
