= 2027 Palarong Pambansa =

Multi-sport event

67th Palarong Pambansa
- Host city: Quezon City, National Capital Region (main)
- Country: Philippines
- Teams: 20 teams (18 regional athletic associations, and two other delegations)
- Sport: 35
- Opened by: President of the Philippines Bongbong Marcos (Expected)
- Closed by: Mayor of Quezon City Joy Belmonte (Expected)
- Main venue: Amoranto Sports Complex
- Broadcast partner: One Sports

The 2027 Palarong Pambansa, officially known as the 67th Palarong Pambansa, is a future multi-sport event to be held in Quezon City in 2027. Student-athletes from 20 athletic associations representing the 18 regions of the Philippines, National Academy of Sports, and the Philippine Schools Overseas will compete in different sporting events and disciplines.

== Hosting ==
=== Bidding ===
There were three bidding provinces in Luzon, the Quezon City, Iba, Zambales, and New Clark City, Tarlac. According to Palarong Pambansa secretary general Malcolm Garma during his press conference at Media Center in Prosperidad, Agusan del Sur, it was revealed that the Quezon City Government was chosen as host of the games. This will be the latest games to be held in Metro Manila since the 2023 games in Marikina.

2027 Palarong Pambansa bids
City/Municipality	Province/Region
Quezon City	National Capital Region
Iba	Zambales
New Clark City	Tarlac

Winning bid

== Development and preparations ==
=== Construction ===
The Quezon City Government on March 14, before they become host of the games, announced the closure of Amoranto Sports Complex for renovation. Only the swimming pool remains open to the public during the works.

== Participating teams ==
Host Region

Regions
Code	Name	Colors
BA	Bangsamoro Autonomous Region in Muslim Mindanao	
CO	Cordillera Administrative Region	
NC	National Capital Region	
NI	Negros Island Region	
IL	Region I or Ilocos	
CG	Region II or Cagayan Valley	
CL	Region III or Central Luzon	
CZ	Region IV-A or - Calabarzon	
MI	Region IV-B or Mimaropa	
BI	Region V or Bicol Region	
WV	Region VI or Western Visayas	
CV	Region VII Central Visayas	
EV	Region VIII or Eastern Visayas	
ZP	Region IX or Zamboanga Peninsula	
NM	Region X or Northern Mindanao	
DA	Region XI or Davao	
SO	Region XII or SOCCSKSARGEN	
CG	Region XIII or Caraga	
Other teams
Code	Name	Colors
NS	National Academy of Sports	
PO	Association of Philippine Schools Overseas	

Host Region

== The Games ==
=== Sports ===
There are a total of 35 sports disciplines, including the para-games, demonstration sports, and exhibition sports.

Demonstration sports

- Esports
- Karatedo
- Kickboxing
- Soft Tennis

Exhibition sports

- Arnis
- Cheerdancing
- Obstacle course
- Traditional games
- Muay Thai
- Sitting Volleyball
- Table Tennis

Parasports

- Athletics
- Bocce
- Goalball
- Swimming

Regular sports

- Archery
- Arnis
- Athletics
- Badminton
- Baseball
- Basketball
- Billiards
- Boxing
- Chess
- Dancesport
- Football
- Futsal
- Gymnastics
  - Aerobics
  - Artistic
  - Rhythmic
- Pencak Silat
- Sepak takraw
- Softball
- Swimming
- Table tennis
- Taekwondo
- Tennis
- Volleyball
- Weightlifting
- Wrestling
- Wushu
