= Palarong Pambansa =

Yearly students' multi-sport competition in the Philippines

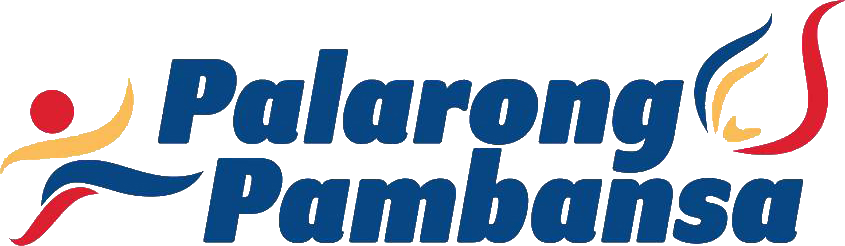
- Logos of the Palarong Pambansa
- Motto: Discipline, Teamwork, Excellence
- Purpose: National multi-sporting event for Filipino student-athletes
- Frequency: Annually
- Inaugurated: 1948 as the BPISAA Games in Manila, Philippines
- Most recent: 2026 in Agusan del Sur
- Next event: 2027 in Quezon City
- Organized by: Department of Education
- Website: palarongpambansa.deped.gov.ph

The Palarong Pambansa (Filipino for "National Games") is an annual multi-sport event involving student-athletes from the different regions of the Philippines. The event which was known as the BPISAA Games from its inception in 1948 until 1973, is organized and governed by the Department of Education.

Student-athletes from public and private schools at elementary and secondary levels can compete, provided they qualified by winning at their regional meet. For young Filipino student-athletes, Palarong Pambansa is the culmination of school sports competition, which start with local school intramurals, followed by the congressional district, provincial, and regional athletic meets.

The objectives of Palaro are:

- To promote physical education and sports as an integral part of the basic education curriculum for holistic development of the youth;
- Inculcate the spirit of discipline, teamwork, excellence, fair play, solidarity, sportsmanship, and other values inherent in sports;
- Promote and achieve peace by means of sports;
- Widen the base for talent identification, selection, recruitment, training, and exposure of elementary pupils and secondary students to serve as a feeder to the National Sports Association (NSA) for international competitions; and
- Provide a database for a valid and universal basis to further improve the school sports development programs.

The legal basis of the Palarong Pambansa is stipulated in the provision of the 1987 Philippine Constitution, Article XIV, Section 19.

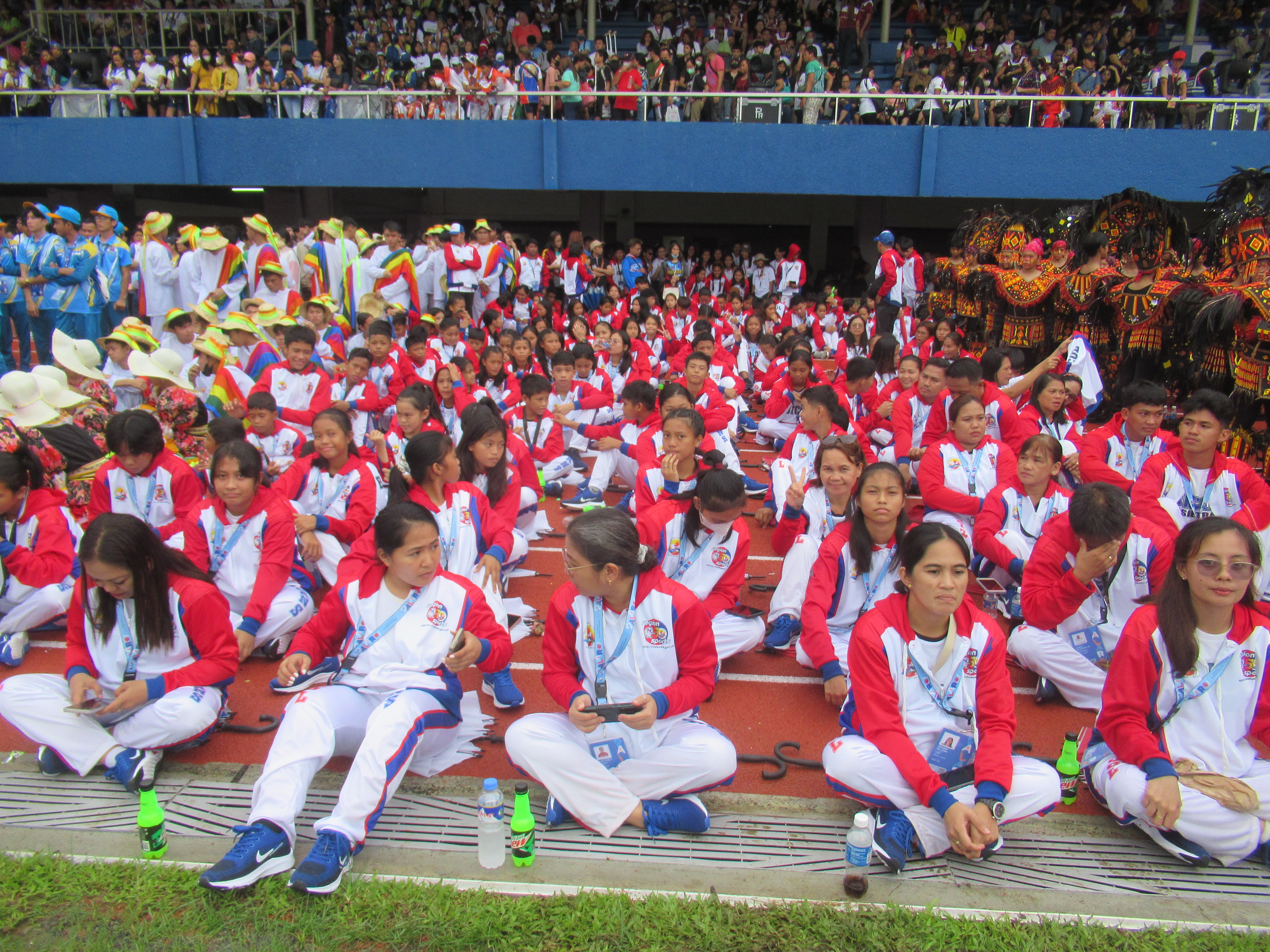
Student-athletes at the 63rd Palarong Pambansa in 2023

== History ==
=== BPISAA Games (1948–1973) ===
The first edition of the games was held in Manila in 1948. Before it was called Palarong Pambansa, it was dubbed as Bureau of Public Schools-Interscholastic Athletics Association Games (BPISAA). It was hosted yearly only disrupted twice; in 1957 due to the death of President Ramon Magsaysay and in 1972 when President Ferdinand Marcos declared martial law.

- 1973-1974: Alice Cusay Babiera - Won 3 gold medals in 400m, 800m, 1500m at Palarong Pambansa. Later became a radio journalist and sports coach in Negros Occidental.

In 1973, the last BPISAA which was held in Vigan, Ilocos Sur.

=== Palarong Pambansa (1974–present) ===
In 1974, the Bureau of Public Schools-Interscholastic Athletics Association Games was renamed Palarong Pambansa.

The 1980 Palarong Pambansa was not conducted was substituted with another tournament called Palarong Bagong Lipunan hosted by Marikina.

In 1984, the games scheduled to be hosted in Laoag. However it was cancelled due to the 1983 Luzon earthquake. Gintong Alay director Michael Keon organized the Palarong Pilipino in Manila in place of the cancelled games in the same year. The games was not be held until 1988, or two years after the People Power Revolution. The 1988 edition was known as the Palarong Paaralang Pambansa. There were plans to organize the games biannually to save funds but this was aborted by the organization of the 1989 games.

Misamis Oriental and Negros Occidental have hosted Palarong Pambansa four times each, more than any other provinces. Misamis Oriental hosted the Palarong Pambansa in 1975, 1977, 1978 and 1988. Negros Occidental hosted the games in 1974, 1979, 1998 and 2000. Lingayen, Pangasinan has hosted three times, in 1959, 1999 and 2012.

==== Institutionalized Palarong Pambansa ====
Starting with the 2015 edition of the games, the Palarong Pambansa Board, which was created due to the Palarong Pambansa Law signed in May 2014, shall be mainly responsible for the preparation and conduct of the games. The board shall be the main policy-making and coordinating body of the annual tournament. The point system which is used to rank teams as early as the 2005 edition was scapped for the 2014 edition. From the 2014 edition, the General Olympic Medal System is used where the number of medals with priority to gold medals is devised to determine team rankings.

The Palaro would be disrupted by the COVID-19 pandemic which led to the cancellation of the 2020 edition and the games not being held at all in 2021 and 2022. The games has returned with the hosting of the 2023 edition in Marikina.

== Participating teams ==
The regions participating in the annual Palarong Pambansa has become bigger as some regions have split. For instance, Southern Tagalog Regional Athletics Association (STRAA) represented the 10 provinces of Southern Tagalog in the later Palarong Pambansa. But it was divided into two, which is now Region 4-A or the Calabarzon region and Region 4-B or the Mimaropa region. Both are taking part in Palarong Pambansa as different teams or regions.

Creation of administrative and autonomous regions such as Bangsamoro (competing since the 2019 edition) and Cordillera Administrative Region and splitting of big region into new regions like the Southern Mindanao, Central Visayas and Western Visayas causes more teams. All these reasons made the 18 regions participating in Palarong Pambansa.

The Autonomous Region in Muslim Mindanao has competed in the Palarong Pambansa from 1994 until 2018. It was succeeded by Bangsamoro. The Negros Island Region (NIR) has also competed during its first iteration from in 2016 and the 2017 editions.

A color coding system was introduced to uniquely identify each region based on their designated colors.

Current teams
Code	PSGC	Name		Monicker	Colors
R1AA Region 1 Athletic Association	01	R-1	Ilocos Region	Mighty Tamaraws	
CAVRAA Cagayan Valley Regional Athletic Association	02	R-2	Cagayan Valley	Green Hawks	
CLRAA Central Luzon Regional Athletic Association	03	R-3	Central Luzon	Central Luzon Patriots	
STCAA Southern Tagalog Calabarzon Athletic Association	04	R-4A	Southern Tagalog – Calabarzon	CALABARZON Heroes	
BRAA Bicol Region Athletic Association	05	R-5	Bicol Region	Bicol Vulcans	
WVRAA Western Visayas Regional Athletic Association	06	R-6	Western Visayas	The Champs Western Visayas	
CVRAA Central Visayas Regional Athletic Association	07	R-7	Central Visayas	CViRAA Fighters	
EVRAA Eastern Visayas Regional Athletic Association	08	R-8	Eastern Visayas	EV Troopers	
ZPRAA Zamboanga Peninsula Regional Athletic Association	09	R-9	Zamboanga Peninsula	Zamboanga Peninsula Sharks	
NMRAA Northern Mindanao Regional Athletic Association	10	R-10	Northern Mindanao	NorthMin Stars	
DAVRAA Davao Region Athletic Association	11	R-11	Davao Region	Davao Eagles	
SRAA Soccsksargen Regional Athletic Association	12	R-12	Soccsksargen	Soccsksargen Warriors	
NCRAA National Capital Region Athletic Association	13	NCR	National Capital Region	NCR Metro Stars	
CARAA Cordillera Administrative Region Athletic Association	14	CAR	Cordillera Administrative Region	Fearless Highlanders	
CARAGARAA Caraga Region Athletic Association	16	R-13	Caraga Region	Caragold	
MRAA Mimaropa Regional Athletic Association	17	MIMAROPA (Note: Formerly designated as Region IV-B until 2016.)	Southwestern Tagalog – Mimaropa	MIMAROPA Tamaraws	
NIRAA Negros Island Region Athletic Association	18	NIR	Negros Island Region (Note: Originally consisted of Negros Occidental and Negros Oriental. The region was re-established in 2024, with the inclusion of Siquijor, an island province southeast of Negros that was previously part of Central Visayas.)	Visayan Vipers	
BARMMAA Bangsamoro Autonomous Region in Muslim Mindanao Athletic Association	18	BARMM	Bangsamoro	BARMM Sultans	
NAS	N/A	National Academy of Sports		NSA Excel Lions	
PSO	N/A	Philippine Schools Overseas		PSO Borderless Vitors	

Historical teams
Code	Name		Colors	Active
ARMMAA	ARMM	Autonomous Region in Muslim Mindanao		1994–2018

== Sports ==
As of 2026, a total of 39 sports disciplines, including the para-games, demonstrations, and exhibition sports.

It also features the Indigenous Filipino (Traditional) Games, also known as "Laro ng Lahi", the DepEd will conduct Kadang-kadang, Tumbang Preso, and Patintero on July 28, as of 2023.

Demonstration Sports

- Karatedo
- Kickboxing
- Soft Tennis

Exhibition Sports

- Cheerdancing
- Esports
- Muay Thai
- Obstacle course
- Sitting Volleyball
- Traditional games

Parasports

- Athletics
- Bocce
- Goalball
- Swimming

Regular Sports

- Archery
- Arnis
- Athletics
- Badminton
- Baseball
- Basketball
- Billiards
- Boxing
- Chess
- Dancesport
- Football
- Futsal
- Gymnastics
  - Aerobics
  - Artistic
  - Rhythmic
- Pencak Silat
- Sepak takraw
- Softball
- Swimming
- Table tennis
- Taekwondo
- Tennis
- Volleyball
- Weightlifting
- Wrestling
- Wushu

== Editions ==
Host cities of Palarong Pambansa in Metro Manila.	Host cities of Palarong Pambansa in Luzon.	Host cities of Palarong Pambansa in Palawan.	Host cities of Palarong Pambansa in Visayas.	Host cities of Palarong Pambansa in Mindanao.

=== BPISAA Games (1948–1973) ===
Edition	Year	Host	Notes
1st	1948	Manila, NCR	
2nd	1949	Tuguegarao, Cagayan, R-2	
3rd	1950	Davao City, R-11	
4th	1951	Cavite City, R-4A	
5th	1952	Legazpi, Albay, R-5	
6th	1953	Vigan, Ilocos Sur, R-1	
7th	1954	Cebu City, R-7	
8th	1955	Iloilo City, R-6	
9th	1956	Batangas City, R-4A	
—N/a	1957	—N/a	Cancelled due to President Ramon Magsaysay's death (1957 Cebu Douglas C-47 crash)
10th	1958	Tagbilaran, R-7	
11th	1959	Lingayen, Pangasinan, R-1	
12th	1960	Manila, NCR	
13th	1961	Cavite City, R-4A	
14th	1962	Ozamiz, R-10	
15th	1963	Roxas, R-6	
16th	1964	Pasig, NCR	
17th	1965	Tacloban, R-8	
18th	1966	Quezon City, NCR	
19th	1967	Laoag, R-1	
20th	1968	Zamboanga City, R-9	
21st	1969	Pili, Camarines Sur, R-5	
22nd	1970	Surigao City, R-13	
23rd	1971	Bacolod, R-6	
—N/a	1972	—N/a	Cancelled due to declaration of martial law
24th	1973	Vigan, Ilocos Sur, R-1	
Source: Department of Education

=== Palarong Pambansa (1974–present) ===
==== Editions from 1974–2003 ====
Edition	Year	Host	Notes
25th	1974	Bacolod, R-6	
26th	1975	Cagayan de Oro, R-10	
27th	1976	Lucena, R-4A	
28th	1977	Cagayan de Oro, R-10	
29th	1978	Cagayan de Oro, R-10	
30th	1979	Bacolod, R-6	
—N/a	1980	—N/a	Cancelled but substituted by Palarong Bagong Lipunan hosted by Marikina, National Capital Region
31st	1981	Tuguegarao, Cagayan, R-2	
32nd	1982	Dipolog, R-9	
33rd	1983	Tacloban, R-8	
—N/a	1984	Laoag, R-1	Cancelled due to 1983 Luzon earthquake but was substituted by the Palarong Pilipino games in Manila
—N/a	1985–87	—N/a	Not held, cancelled in 1986 due to the People Power Revolution
34th	1988	Cagayan de Oro, R-10	Known as the Palarong Paaralang Pambansa.
35th	1989	Lucena, R-4A	
36th	1990	San Fernando, Pampanga, R-3	
37th	1991	Iloilo City, R-6	
38th	1992	Zamboanga City, R-9	
39th	1993	Ilagan, Isabela, R-2	
40th	1994	Cebu City, R-7	
41st	1995	Lingayen, Pangasinan, R-1	
42nd	1996	Koronadal, South Cotabato, R-12; General Santos, R-12; Province of Sarangani, R-12	
43rd	1997	Legazpi, Albay, R-5	
44th	1998	Bacolod, R-6	
—N/a	1999	Tubod, Lanao del Norte, R-10	Cancelled due to security isuues
45th	2000	Bacolod, R-6	
—N/a	2001	Tubod, Lanao del Norte, R-10	Cancelled due to lack of fund and security isuues
46th	2002	Naga, Camarines Sur, R-5	
47th	2003	Tubod, Lanao del Norte, R-10	
—N/a	2004	—N/a	Cancelled due to 2004 National Elections
Source: Department of Education

==== Palaro under the Point System (2005–2013) ====
From as early as the 2005 edition to 2013, the point system is used to determine the rankings of the participating team. There is no comprehensive information for earlier editions of the games including the system officially in used.

Edition	Year	Host	Results			Ref / Notes
Edition	Year	Host	First place	Second place	Third place	Ref / Notes
48th^{1}	2005	Iloilo City, R-6	638 - National Capital Region (NCR)	434 - Western Visayas (R-6)	411.1 - Calabarzon (R-4A)	
49th	2006	Naga, Camarines Sur, R-5	512.67 - National Capital Region (NCR)	428 - Calabarzon (R-4A)	367.5 - Western Visayas (R-6)	
50th	2007	Koronadal, South Cotabato, R-12	640.4 - National Capital Region (NCR)	455 - Western Visayas (R-6)	332 - Calabarzon (R-4A)	
51st	2008	Puerto Princesa, R-4B	638 - National Capital Region (NCR)	434 - Western Visayas (R-6)	411.1 - Calabarzon (R-4A)	
52nd	2009	Tacloban, R-8	588.34 - National Capital Region (NCR)	460.17 - Western Visayas (R-6)	382.5 - Calabarzon (R-4A)	
53rd	2010	San Jose, Tarlac, R-3	643 - National Capital Region (NCR)	432.67 - Western Visayas (R-6)	404.67 - Calabarzon (R-4A)	
54th	2011	Dapitan, R-9	572.66 - National Capital Region (NCR)	479.50 - Western Visayas (R-6)	429.50 - Calabarzon (R-4A)	
55th	2012	Lingayen, Pangasinan, R-1	733 - National Capital Region (NCR)	452 - Western Visayas (R-6)	335.5 - Calabarzon (R-4A)	
56th	2013	Dumaguete, R-7	596.5 - National Capital Region (NCR)	446.34 - Western Visayas (R-6)	333 - Central Visayas (R-7)	

==== Palaro under the General Olympic Medal System (2014–present) ====
The Palarong Pambansa was institutionalized through the Palarong Pambansa Act. With it the traditional ranking by medal count is used from the 2014 edition.

Edition	Year	Host	Results			Ref / Notes
Edition	Year	Host	First place	Second place	Third place	Ref / Notes
57th	2014	Santa Cruz, Laguna, R-4A	107 - National Capital Region (NCR)	38 - Calabarzon (R-4A)	32 - Western Visayas (R-6)	
58th	2015	Tagum, Davao del Norte, R-11	236 - National Capital Region (NCR)	141 - Calabarzon (R-4A)	131 - Western Visayas (R-6)	
59th	2016	Legazpi, Albay, R-5	209 - National Capital Region (NCR)	142 - Calabarzon (R-4A)	109 - Western Visayas (R-6)	
60th	2017	San Jose de Buenavista, Antique, R-6	209 - National Capital Region (NCR)	155 - Calabarzon (R-4A)	107 - Western Visayas (R-6)	
61st	2018	Ilocos Sur, R-1	220 - National Capital Region (NCR)	178 - Calabarzon (R-4A)	146 - Western Visayas (R-6)	
62nd	2019	Davao City, R-11	213 - National Capital Region (NCR)	188 - Calabarzon (R-4A)	147 - Western Visayas (R-6)	
—N/a	2020	Marikina City, NCR^{3,4}	Cancelled due to COVID-19 pandemic			
—N/a	2021–2022	Cancelled due to COVID-19 pandemic				
63rd	2023	Marikina City, NCR	214 - National Capital Region (NCR)	149 - Western Visayas (R-6)	161 - Calabarzon (R-4A)	
64th	2024	Cebu City, R-7	238 – National Capital Region (NCR)	161 – Calabarzon (R-4A)	138 – Western Visayas (R-6)	
65th	2025	Ilocos Norte, R-1	237 – National Capital Region (NCR)	181 – Calabarzon (R-4A)	156 – Western Visayas (R-6)	
66th	2026	Agusan del Sur, R-13	233 – National Capital Region (NCR)	165 – Calabarzon (R-4A)	100 – Davao Region (R-11)	
67th	2027	Quezon City, NCR	Future event			
68th	2028	TBA, Visayas	Future event			
Source: Department of Education (until 65th edition)

Note:

- ^{1} Hosting of Palarong Pambansa is from Luzon and then Visayas and then back to Luzon and then Mindanao. This order will be repeated. If Visayas have no bids to host the Palaro, then Mindanao will have the rights to host and/or vice versa. If Luzon have no bids, Metro Manila will be going to host the Palaro.
- ^{2} Negros Island Region (NIR) is a newly created region in 2015 which consists of Negros Occidental and Negros Oriental. Any existing previous list and records should be counted for the previous regions they are affiliated with otherwise, their records and statistics should be counted for their present region at the time of their creation unless otherwise specified.
- ^{3} The original host was in Occidental Mindoro, but was forced to back-out due to damages brought to the province by Typhoon Tisoy.
- ^{4}After the withdrawal of Occidental Mindoro as hosts, Marikina replaced as host city for 2020, but the 2020 Palaro was cancelled due to coronavirus pandemic in the Philippines. However, DepEd has announced that Marikina will retain hosting rights for the 2023 edition of the event, with Cebu City and Laoag's hosting moved to 2024 and 2025, respectively.

== Results ==
=== Medal rankings (2014–present) ===
As of 31 May 2026, 11:59:59PM (UTC+8); Overall medal count ranking for regular games since 2014

Defunct region

Rank	Region	Gold	Silver	Bronze	Total
1	National Capital Region (NCRAA)	984	676	576	2236
2	Calabarzon (IV-A STCAA)	502	512	598	1612
3	Western Visayas (VI-WVRAA)	433	406	459	1298
4	Central Visayas (VII-CVIRAA)	253	274	367	894
5	Northern Mindanao (X-NMRAA)	216	228	356	800
6	Central Luzon (III-CLRAA)	210	225	316	751
7	Davao Region (XI-DavRAA)	208	238	291	737
8	Soccsksargen (XII-SRAA)	189	244	327	760
9	Cordillera Administrative Region (CARAA)	183	163	170	516
10	Bicol Region (V-BRAA)	112	138	245	495
11	Caraga (CARAGARAA)	103	109	200	412
12	Eastern Visayas (VIII-EVRAA)	96	110	156	362
13	Ilocos Region (I-R1AA)	89	119	224	432
14	Cagayan Valley (II-CAVRAA)	66	112	146	324
15	Negros Island Region (NIRAA)	63	79	104	246
16	Zamboanga Peninsula (IX-ZPRAA)	51	71	151	273
17	Mimaropa (IV-B MRAA)	41	66	90	197
18	National Academy of Sports (NAS)	18	12	20	50
19	Bangsamoro Autonomous Region (BARMAA)	10	16	20	46
20	Autonomous Region in Muslim Mindanao (ARMM)	8	11	26	45
21	Philippine Schools Overseas (PSO)	0	0	1	1

=== Standings by tournament ===
The following standings per region since the 2008 edition as per the Games and Results Documentation Committee. Do note that the standings until 2013 were determined using a points system rather than the number of medals.

Team	2008 (17)	2009 (17)	2010 (17)	2011 (17)	2012 (17)	2013 (17)	2014 (17)	2015 (17)	2016 (18)	2017 (18)	2018 (17)	2019 (17)	2023 (17)	2024 (19)	2025 (19)	2026 (20)
ARMM	13th	13th	16th	17th	15th	15th	16th	14th	17th	18th	17th	Competing as Bangsamoro				
Bangsamoro	Competing as ARMM											16th	17th	17th	18th	19th
Cordillera Administrative Region	11th	10th	10th	11th	11th	10th	5th	4th	9th	6th	5th	10th	9th	13th	9th	15th
National Capital Region	1st	1st	1st	1st	1st	1st	1st	1st	1st	1st	1st	1st	1st	1st	1st	1st
Ilocos Region	10th	12th	13th	12th	9th	8th	11th	17th	14th	13th	11th	9th	11th	15th	12th	13th
Cagayan Valley	17th	17th	15th	14th	13th	16th	13th	12th	16th	12th	10th	14th	12th	14th	15th	18th
Central Luzon	5th	8th	6th	8th	6th	6th	10th	7th	8th	10th	8th	6th	4th	6th	6th	18th
Calabarzon	3rd	3rd	3rd	3rd	3rd	5th	2nd	2nd	2nd	2nd	2nd	2nd	3rd	2nd	2nd	2nd
Mimaropa	9th	9th	9th	9th	8th	9th	15th	13th	15th	17th	15th	15th	13th	16th	16th	17th
Bicol Region	12th	15th	12th	13th	14th	12th	9th	10th	11th	11th	13th	7th	10th	10th	13th	14th
Western Visayas	2nd	2nd	2nd	2nd	2nd	2nd	3rd	3rd	3rd	3rd	3rd	3rd	2nd	3rd	3rd	5th
Central Visayas	4th	4th	4th	4th	4th	3rd	4th	6th	4th	9th	4th	5th	5th	5th	7th	4th
Eastern Visayas	15th	14th	14th	16th	17th	17th	14th	11th	13th	15th	12th	13th	14th	7th	10th	12th
Negros Island Region	Part of (Region VI) and (Region VII)						7th	4th	Part of (Region VI) and (Region VII)							11th
Zamboanga Peninsula	14th	11th	11th	10th	12th	14th	17th	16th	12th	16th	16th	17th	16th	11th	17th	10th
Northern Mindanao	8th	7th	5th	5th	5th	4th	6th	5th	5th	8th	6th	8th	7th	9th	5th	7th
Davao Region	6th	6th	8th	7th	10th	11th	8th	9th	10th	7th	9th	11th	6th	4th	4th	3rd
Soccsksargen	7th	5th	7th	6th	7th	7th	7th	8th	7th	5th	7th	4th	8th	8th	11th	9th
Caraga	16th	16th	17th	15th	16th	13th	12th	15th	18th	14th	14th	12th	15th	12th	8th	6th
National Academy of Sports	Not yet established													18th	14th	16th
Philippine Schools Overseas	Not yet established													19th	19th	20th

== List of hosts ==
By city/municipality
Host city/municipality	Event hosted
Bacolod	5
Cagayan de Oro	4
Iloilo City	3
Naga, Camarines Sur	2
Tacloban	3
Lingayen, Pangasinan	3
Vigan, Ilocos Sur	3
Manila	2
Tuguegarao, Cagayan	2
Lucena	2
Zamboanga City	2
Cebu City	3
Koronadal, South Cotabato^{a}	2
Davao City	2
Marikina	1
Cavite City	2
Legazpi, Albay	3
Batangas City	1
Tagbilaran	1
Ozamiz	1
Roxas	1
Pasig	1
Quezon City	1
Laoag City	1
Pili, Camarines Sur	1
Surigao City	1
Dipolog	1
San Fernando, Pampanga	1
Ilagan, Isabela	1
Tubod, Lanao del Norte	1
Puerto Princesa	1
San Jose, Tarlac	1
Dapitan	1
Dumaguete	1
Santa Cruz, Laguna	1
Tagum	1
Guinobatan, Albay	1
San Jose de Buenavista, Antique	1
Prosperidad, Agusan del Sur	1
Note: a 1996 Palarong Pambansa was co-hosted by General Santos, South Cotabato.

By province
Host	Event hosted
Negros Occidental (R-6)	5
Metro Manila (NCR)^{a}	5
Misamis Oriental (R-10)	4
Camarines Sur (R-5)	4
Iloilo (R-6)	3
Leyte (R-8)	3
Pangasinan (R-1)	3
Ilocos Sur (R-1)	3
Cavite (R-4A)	2
Cagayan (R-2)	2
Quezon (R-4A)	2
Zamboanga del Sur (R-9)	2
Cebu (R-7)	3
South Cotabato (R-12)^{b}	2
Zamboanga del Norte (R-9)	2
Albay (R-5)	4
Davao del Sur (R-11)	2
Batangas (R-4A)	1
Bohol (R-7)	1
Misamis Occidental (R-10)	1
Capiz (R-6)	1
Ilocos Norte (R-1) ^{c}	1
Surigao del Norte (R-13)	1
Pampanga (R-3)	1
Isabela (R-2)	1
Lanao del Norte (R-10)	1
Palawan (R-4B)	1
Tarlac (R-3)	1
Negros Oriental (R-7)	1
Laguna (R-4A)	1
Davao del Norte (R-11)	1
Antique (R-6)	1
Agusan del Sur (R-13) ^{d}	
Note: a Metro Manila is not a province. It is a representation to complete the data.; b 1996 Palarong Pambansa was co-hosted by Province of Sarangani.; c Upcoming host for the 2025 Palarong Pambansa.; d Upcoming host for the 2026 Palarong Pambansa.

By region
Host	Event hosted
Bicol Region (R-5)	10
Western Visayas (R-6) ^{c}	10
Ilocos Region (R-1) ^{a}	7
Northern Mindanao (R-10)	6
Calabarzon (R-4A)	6
National Capital Region (NCR)	5
Central Visayas (R-7) ^{c}	4
Zamboanga Peninsula (R-9)	4
Cagayan Valley (R-2)	3
Eastern Visayas (R-8)	3
Davao Region (R-11)	3
Soccsksargen (R-12)	2
Central Luzon (R-3)	2
Caraga Region (R-13) ^{b}	1
Mimaropa (R-4B)	1
Note: a Upcoming host for the 2025 Palarong Pambansa.; b Upcoming host for the 2026 Palarong Pambansa.; c Negros Island Region (NIR) is a newly created region in 2015 which consists of Negros Occidental and Negros Oriental. Any existing previous list and records should be counted for the previous regions they are affiliated with.

By island group
Host	Event hosted
Luzon^{a} (NCR)	29 (5)
Visayas	17
Mindanao ^{b}	15
Note: a Upcoming host for the 2025 Palarong Pambansa; b Upcoming host for the 2026 Palarong Pambansa

== See also ==
- Batang Pinoy
- Philippine National Games
