= 2024 Palarong Pambansa =

Philippine multi-sport event

64th Palarong Pambansa
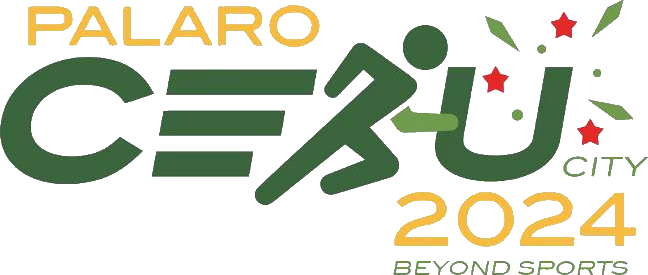
- Logo
- Host city: Cebu City, Cebu
- Country: Philippines
- Motto: "Beyond Sports"
- Teams: 19 (17 regional athletic associations and two other delegations)
- Athletes: 13,000
- Opening: July 9, 2024
- Closing: July 16, 2024
- Opened by: President Bongbong Marcos
- Closed by: Vice President Sara Duterte
- Athlete's Oath: Mitchloni Dinaunao
- Judge's Oath: Jeanette Obiena
- Main venue: Cebu City Sports Center

The 2024 Palarong Pambansa, officially known as the 64th Palarong Pambansa, was a multi-sport event held in Cebu City, Cebu, from July 9 to July 16, 2024. Student-athletes from 19 athletic associations consisting the 17 regions of the Philippines, the National Academy of Sports, and the Philippine Schools Overseas competed in different sporting events and disciplines.

== Hosting ==
Cebu City was given the rights to host the games on February 2, 2024.

== The Games ==
=== Participating teams ===
The 2024 edition of the games, saw the debut of two new teams. These debutants are not region-based; they are members of the National Academy of Sports and Philippine Schools Overseas. Despite the formation of the Negros Island Region in 2024, there is no delegation which officially represented the newly reestablished region.

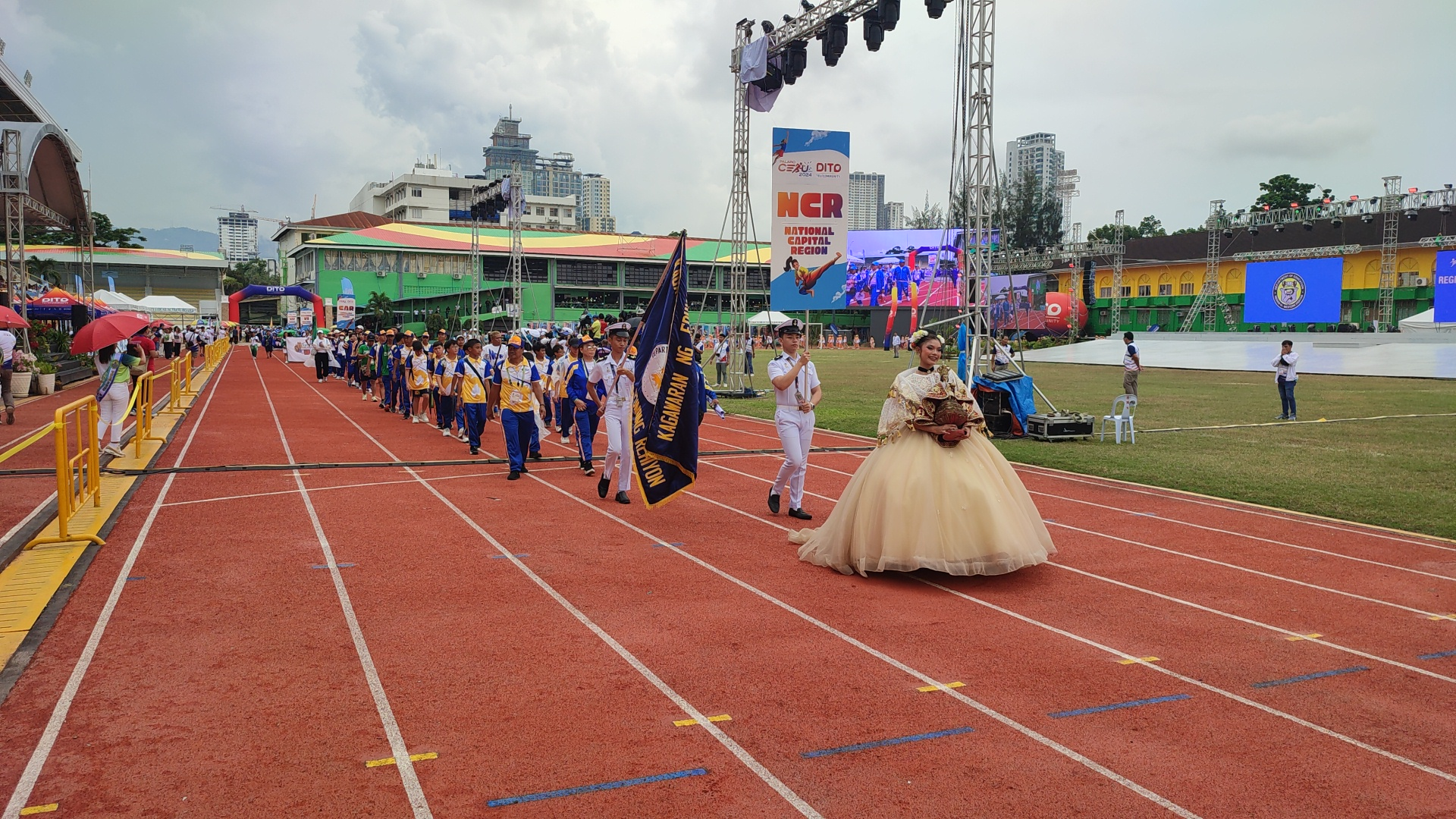
NCRAA delegation during the opening of the games

Host Region

Regions
| Code | Official name | Region colors |
|---|---|---|
| BARMAA | Bangsamoro Autonomous Region in Muslim Mindanao | |
| CARAA | Cordillera Administrative Region | |
| NCRAA | National Capital Region | |
| I-R1AA | Region I / Ilocos Region | |
| II-CAVRAA | Region II / Cagayan Valley | |
| III-CLRAA | Region III / Central Luzon | |
| IV-A STCAA | Region IV-A / Southern Tagalog - Calabarzon | |
| IV-B MRAA | Region IV-B / Southern Tagalog - Mimaropa | |
| V-BRAA | Region V / Bicol Region | |
| VI-WVRAA | Region VI / Western Visayas | |
| VII-CVIRAA | Region VII / Central Visayas | |
| VIII-EVRAA | Region VIII / Eastern Visayas | |
| IX-ZPRAA | Region IX / Zamboanga Peninsula | |
| X-NMRAA | Region X / Northern Mindanao | |
| XI-DAVRAA | Region XI / Davao Region | |
| XII-SRAA | Region XII / Soccsksargen | |
| CARAGA | Region XIII / Caraga | |
Other teams
| Code | Official name | Colors |
| NAS | National Academy of Sports | |
| PSO | Philippine Schools Overseas | |

=== Venues ===
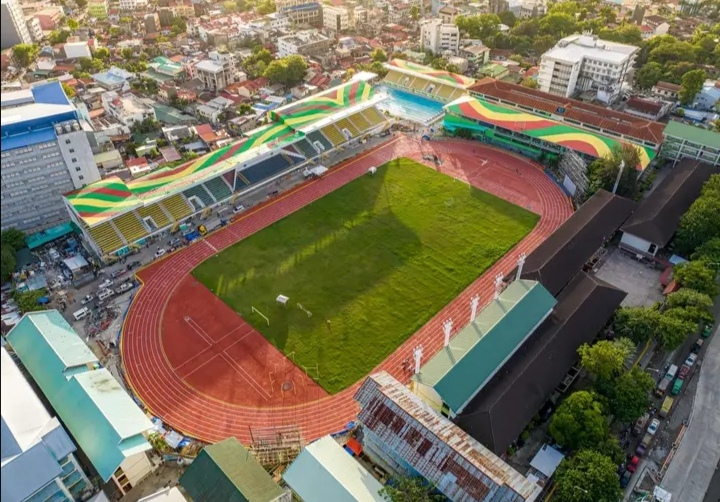
Cebu City Sports Center, the opening and closing ceremony venue

The following were the venues for the 2024 Palarong Pambansa.

| City | Venue | Event |
|---|---|---|
| Cebu City | Asmara Tennis Club | Tennis |
| Cebu City | Alta Vista Tennis Club – Pardo | Tennis |
| Cebu City | Cebu City Sports Center | Athletics, Football |
| Cebu City | Cebu Coliseum | Boxing |
| Cebu City | Cebu Eastern College Gym | 3x3 basketball |
| Cebu City | Cebu Institute of Technology-University | Gymnastics (artistic) |
| Cebu City | Cebu Technological University | Table tennis |
| Cebu City | City Di Mare | Baseball |
| Cebu City | Citigreen Tennis Resort | Tennis |
| Cebu City | Don Bosco Technical College–Cebu | Football |
| Cebu City | Gaisano Mall of Cebu | Dancesport |
| Cebu City | IL Corso Filinvest Malls | Billiards |
| Cebu City | MetroSports Center | Badminton |
| Cebu City | SM Seaside City | Taekwondo, Wrestling, Softball (Lot 11) |
| Cebu City | South Road Properties Grounds | Archery |
| Cebu City | University of the Philippines Cebu – Lahug Campus | Chess |
| Cebu City | University of Cebu - Maritime Education and Training Center | Pencak silat, wushu |
| Cebu City | University of San Carlos – Main Campus | Basketball |
| Cebu City | University of San Carlos – North Campus | Basketball |
| Cebu City | University of San Carlos – Talamban Campus | Football |
| Cebu City | University of San Jose–Recoletos – Basak Campus | Volleyball |
| Cebu City | University of Southern Philippines Foundation | Gymnastics (rhythmic) |
| Cebu City | University of the Visayas – Main | Gymnastics (aerobic) |
| Cebu City | Villa Aurora Tennis Club | Tennis |
| Lapu-Lapu City | Hoops Dome | Basketball |
| Mandaue | Mandaue Sports Complex | Arnis |
| Mandaue | Sacred Heart School - Ateneo de Cebu | Football, Futsal, Sepak takraw |
| Talisay | Dynamic Herb Sports Complex | Football |

== Medal tally ==
=== Regular games ===
| Rank | Region | Gold | Silver | Bronze | Total |
|---|---|---|---|---|---|
| 1 | National Capital Region (NCRAA) | 98 | 66 | 74 | 238 |
| 2 | Calabarzon (IV-A STCAA) | 57 | 51 | 53 | 161 |
| 3 | Western Visayas (VI-WVRAA) | 56 | 41 | 41 | 138 |
| 4 | Davao Region (XI-DavRAA) | 32 | 25 | 35 | 92 |
| 5 | Central Visayas (VII-CVIRAA)* | 29 | 42 | 39 | 110 |
| 6 | Central Luzon (III-CLRAA) | 25 | 37 | 45 | 107 |
| 7 | Eastern Visayas (VIII-EVRAA) | 18 | 14 | 22 | 54 |
| 8 | Soccsksargen (XII-SRAA) | 17 | 23 | 31 | 71 |
| 9 | Northern Mindanao (X-NMRAA) | 14 | 27 | 43 | 84 |
| 10 | Bicol Region (V-BRAA) | 14 | 15 | 20 | 49 |
| 11 | Caraga (CARAGA) | 12 | 7 | 16 | 35 |
| 11 | Zamboanga Peninsula (IX-ZPRAA) | 12 | 7 | 16 | 35 |
| 13 | Cordillera Administrative Region (CARAA) | 11 | 8 | 18 | 37 |
| 14 | Cagayan Valley (II-CAVRAA) | 7 | 15 | 22 | 44 |
| 15 | Ilocos Region (I-R1AA) | 5 | 14 | 10 | 29 |
| 16 | Mimaropa (IV-B MRAA) | 2 | 6 | 9 | 17 |
| 17 | Bangsamoro (BARMAA) | 2 | 1 | 4 | 7 |
| 18 | National Academy of Sports (NAS) | 1 | 5 | 2 | 8 |
| 19 | Philippine Schools Overseas (PSO) | 0 | 0 | 1 | 1 |
| Totals (19 entries) | | 412 | 404 | 501 | 1,317 |

Source: 2024 Palarong Pambansa Medal Tally (Rappler)

== Controversy ==
During the games, the track oval of the Cebu City Sports Complex was not satisfied by officials due to its fell short of 400-meter World Athletics standard distance, therefore some of the athletic track records were nullified.
