= Ferdinand Marcos (disambiguation) =

Ferdinand Marcos (1917−1989), also known as Ferdinand Marcos Sr., was a Filipino politician, lawyer, dictator, and kleptocrat who served as the 10th President of the Philippines from 1965 until his removal in 1986.

Ferdinand Marcos may also refer to:

- Bongbong Marcos (born 1957), also known as Ferdinand "Bongbong" Romualdez Marcos Jr., son of Marcos Sr. and incumbent president of the Philippines since 2022
- Sandro Marcos (born 1994), also known as Ferdinand Alexander "Sandro" Araneta Marcos III, grandson of Marcos Sr. and current Majority Floor Leader of the House of Representatives of the Philippines since 2025

== See also ==
- Marcos Stadium, also known as the Ferdinand E. Marcos Memorial Stadium, a football and track stadium in Laoag, Philippines
- Ferdinand E. Marcos Presidential Center, museum in Batac, Ilocos Norte, Philippines
