= 2020 Palarong Pambansa =

- Host city: Marikina, Metro Manila (cancelled); Mamburao, Occidental Mindoro (withdrew)
- Country: Philippines
- Events: 18 regular games 6 demonstration games 4 special games
- Opening: cancelled
- Closing: cancelled
- Main venue: Marikina Sports Center

The 2020 Palarong Pambansa, supposed to be as the 63rd Palarong Pambansa, (Note: The resumed games in 2023 would also be numbered as the 63rd.) was a planned multi-sport event scheduled to be held in Marikina, Metro Manila, from May 1 to 9, 2020. Originally planned to be held in Mamburao, Occidental Mindoro, the games were moved to Marikina due to the aftermath of Typhoon Kammuri. The games were ultimately postponed to 2022 due to the effects of the COVID-19 pandemic in the Philippines. This marked the first time in history in which the Palarong Pambansa has been withdrawn consecutively by the organizers of two official hosts: Occidental Mindoro and Marikina.

== Hosting ==
=== Bidding ===
The province of Occidental Mindoro and the cities of Marikina and Puerto Princesa made a bid to host the 63rd Palarong Pambansa. Occidental Mindoro won the hosting rights after deliberation on the proposals of bidding local government units. The decision was reached by the Palarong Pambansa board on April 3, 2019 in Quezon City. After the withdrawal of Occidental Mindoro, Marikina was considered as the strongest replacement candidate.

2020 Palarong Pambansa bids
City	Province
Mamburao	Occidental Mindoro (withdrew)
Marikina	Metro Manila (cancelled)
Puerto Princesa	Palawan

== Mamburao, Occidental Mindoro ==
=== Withdrawal ===
Occidental Mindoro was forced to withdraw its hosting rights for the Palarong Pambansa after it was devastated by Typhoon Kammuri in November, with damages amounting to more than ₱800 million. The provincial government allocated the funds slated for the event to relief efforts in the typhoon's aftermath. The 63rd Palarong Pambansa would have been the first time in which the Palaro was held in Occidental Mindoro and the second in the Mimaropa region after Puerto Princesa hosted the games in 2008.

== Marikina ==
Palarong Pambansa originally awarded the games to Occidental Mindoro in April 2019, but the hosting rights were given up over a half year later. Marikina was considered as the strongest replacement candidate in 2020 bid.

Like Occidental Mindoro, this was supposed to be Marikina's first time to host the Palarong Pambansa, NCR's fifth hosting since the 1966 Palarong Pambansa held in Quezon City, after 54 years. Marikina will be the fourth city in NCR to stage the Palarong Pambansa after Manila (1948, 1st edition and 1960, 12th edition), Pasig (1964, 16th edition) and Quezon City (1966, 18th edition).

Marikina is part of NCR contingent and Marikina Sports Center will serve as the main venue. Marikina also bids the recent editions of Palarong Pambansa and all won as one of the candidate cities: 2014 (runner-up to Sta. Cruz, Laguna) and 2012 (runner-up to Lingayen, Pangasinan).

In history, Marikina was supposed to host the "31st" Palarong Pambansa in 1980 but was canceled. Marikina hosted the 1980 Palarong Bagong Lipunan as a substitute for 1980 Palarong Pambansa.

Marikina also previously hosted some major multi-sporting events: 2019 NCR Palaro, 2014 ASEAN School Games, 2011 UAAP Season 74, 2005 Southeast Asian Games, 1980 Palarong Bagong Lipunan, the first edition of 1973 Asian Athletics Championships and 1972 ISF Men's World Championship.

=== Postponement and cancellation ===
On March 9, 2020, the Department of Education postponed the Palarong Pambansa as part of precautionary measures to prevent the spread of the coronavirus pandemic, it continued until the year 2022. Marikina Mayor Marcelino Teodoro who made the announcement after consultation with the Palaro board and other officials.

=== Return ===
Nearly three years since the onset of the COVID-19 pandemic forced its cancellation, the local government of Marikina, DepEd-NCR, and the Schools Division Office of Marikina are set to host the 63rd edition of Palarong Pambansa from July 29 to August 5, 2023. Marikina Sports Center will serve as the main venue to attend 9,172 student-athletes contested in 1,573 events in 34 different sports.

=== Proposed venues ===
At least 29 facilities were supposed to be the venues to be used for 2020 Palarong Pambansa.

Regular Events
Event	Venue	Location
Archery	Marquinton Open Field - Archery Range	Santo Niño
Arnis	Riverbanks Center Activity Center	Barangka
Aquatics	Marikina Sports Center - Pool Area	Santo Niño
Athletics	Marikina Sports Center - Athletics Track	Santo Niño
Badminton	Trevi Indoor Gymnasium	Concepcion Uno
Baseball	Marquinton Open Field - Baseball Field	Santo Niño
Basketball	Marikina Sports Center Gymnasium	Santo Niño
Basketball	Fairlane Gymnasium	Nangka
Basketball	Simeona Gymnasium	Concepcion Uno
Basketball	Parang Multi-purpose Gymnasium	Parang
Boxing	Plaza De Los Alcades (Marikina Hall Grounds)	Santa Elena
Chess	Marikina Convention Center	Concepcion Dos
Football	Marikina Sports Center - Football Field	Santo Niño
Football	Moro Lorenzo Football Field (Ateneo De Manila)	Loyola Heights
Football	Marist School Football Field	Marikina Heights
Futsal	Hacienda Heights Open Park	Marikina Heights
Gymnastics	RMSC Gymnastics Hall	Malate
Gymnastics	PCCI Gymnasium	Santo Niño
Sepak takraw	Marikina High School Gymnasium	Concepcion Uno
Softball	Barangka Baseball Field	Barangka
Softball	Santo Niño Baseball Field	Santo Niño
Table tennis	Jesus Dela Peña National High School Activity Hall	Jesus Dela Peña
Taekwondo	Riverbanks Center e-Com Center	Barangka
Tennis	Marikina Sports Center - Tennis Area	Santo Niño
Tennis	Rancho Estate Tennis Court	Marikina Heights
Tennis	Marist School Tennis Center	Marikina Heights
Volleyball	OLOPSC Gymnasium	Marikina Heights
Volleyball	Marist School Gymnasium	Marikina Heights
Volleyball	Sta. Teresita Village Gymnasium	Concepcion Uno
Volleyball	Amang Rodriguez Gymnasium	Marikina Heights
Volleyball	Manotoc Gymnasium	Santo Niño

Demonstration Sports
Event	Venue	Location
Aerobic Gymnastics	Marikina Convention Center	Concepcion Dos
Billiards	Sta. Lucia Billiards Center	San Isidro
Dancesport	Marikina Sports Center Gymnasium	Santo Niño
Pencak Silat	Evergreen San Roque	San Roque
Wrestling	Marikina Heights Barangay Hall Gymnasium	Marikina Heights
Wushu	Concepcion Dos Barangay Hall Gymnasium	Concepcion Dos

Special Para Events
Event	Venue	Location
Bocce	Woodridge Events Center (Loyola Grand Villas)	Tumana
Goalball	Loyola Grand Villas Open Field	Tumana

=== Sports ===
==== Regular sports ====
Like in the previous games, these are regular, demonstration and para sports disciplines were supposed to be contested at the games.

- Archery
- Arnis
- Aquatics
- Athletics
- Badminton
- Baseball
- Basketball
- Boxing
- Chess
- Football
- Futsal
- Gymnastics
- Sepak takraw (Boys)
- Softball
- Table tennis
- Taekwondo
- Tennis
- Volleyball

==== Demonstration sports ====
- Aerobic Gymnastics
- Billiards
- Dancesport
- Pencak Silat
- Sepak takraw (Girls)
- Wrestling
- Wushu

==== Para sports ====
- Swimming
- Bocce
- Goalball
- Athletics
