= Alice Cusay Babiera =

Filipino track and field athlete

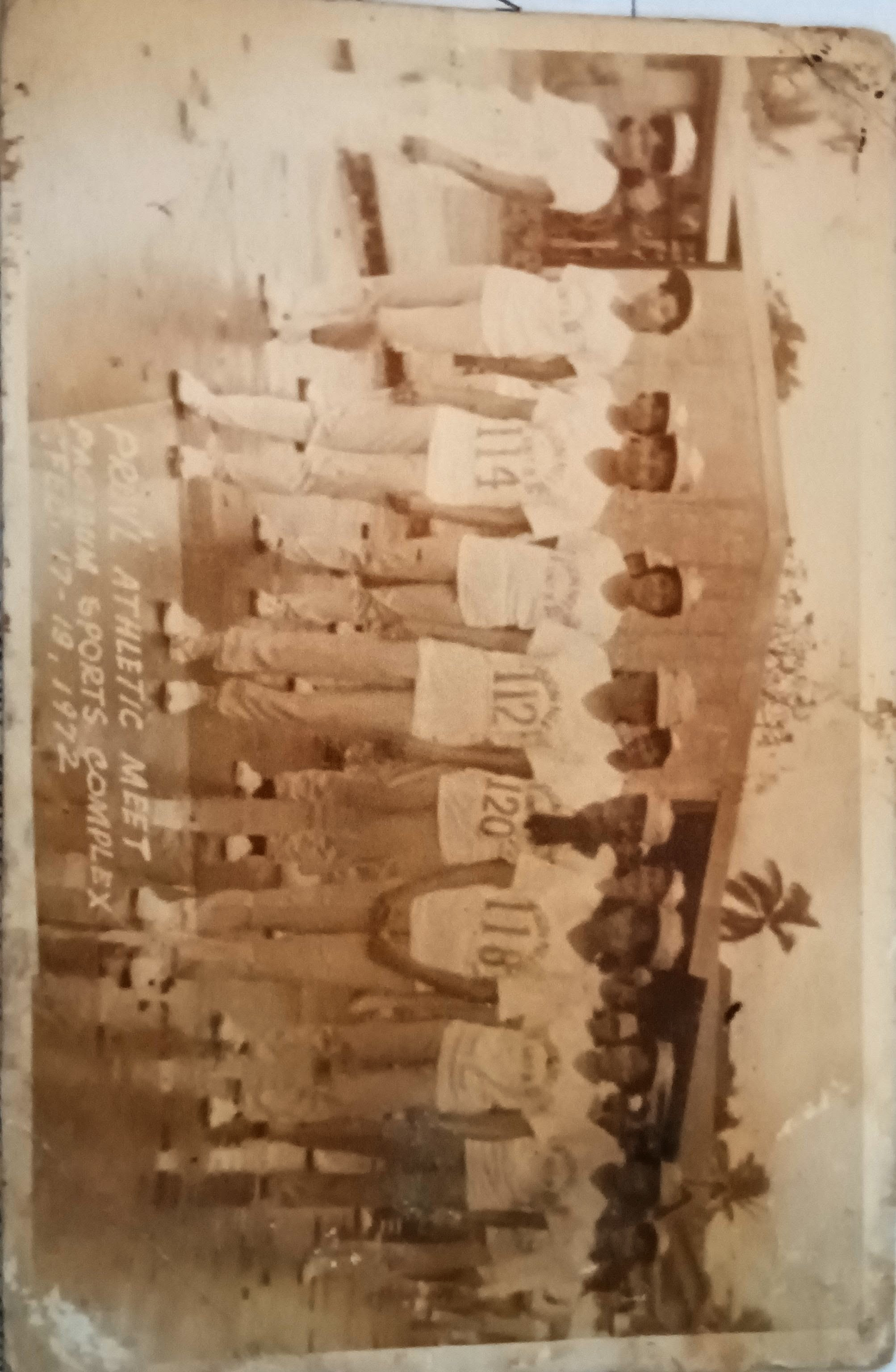
- Alice at the 1972 Provincial Athletic Meet

Personal information
- Nationality: Filipino
- Born: November 6, 1956 Negros Occidental, Philippines

Sport
- Sport: Athletics
- Events: 400m, 800m, 1500m
- Club: WVAA Team
Medal record
Women's athletics
Representing Philippines
Palarong Pambansa
Gold medal – first place	1973	800 metres
Gold medal – first place	1973	1500 metres
Gold medal – first place	1974	400 metres

Alice Cusay Babiera is a former Filipino track and field athlete from Negros Occidental who won 3 gold medals at the Palarong Pambansa in 1973 and 1974. She later became a radio journalist and sports coach.

== Track and field career ==
Alice Cusay-Babiera
Sport
- Sport: Athletics
- Events: 800 metres, 1500 metres

Alice Cusay-Babiera is a Filipino former track and field athlete, coach, and public servant from Negros Occidental. She was a gold medalist and former record holder in the 1,500 metres at the Palarong Pambansa and represented the Philippines in international competition.

== Early life and athletic career ==
Alicia Cusay-Babiera is a former Filipino track and field athlete from Negros Occidental who competed in middle-distance events. She was a national record holder in the 1,500 metres.

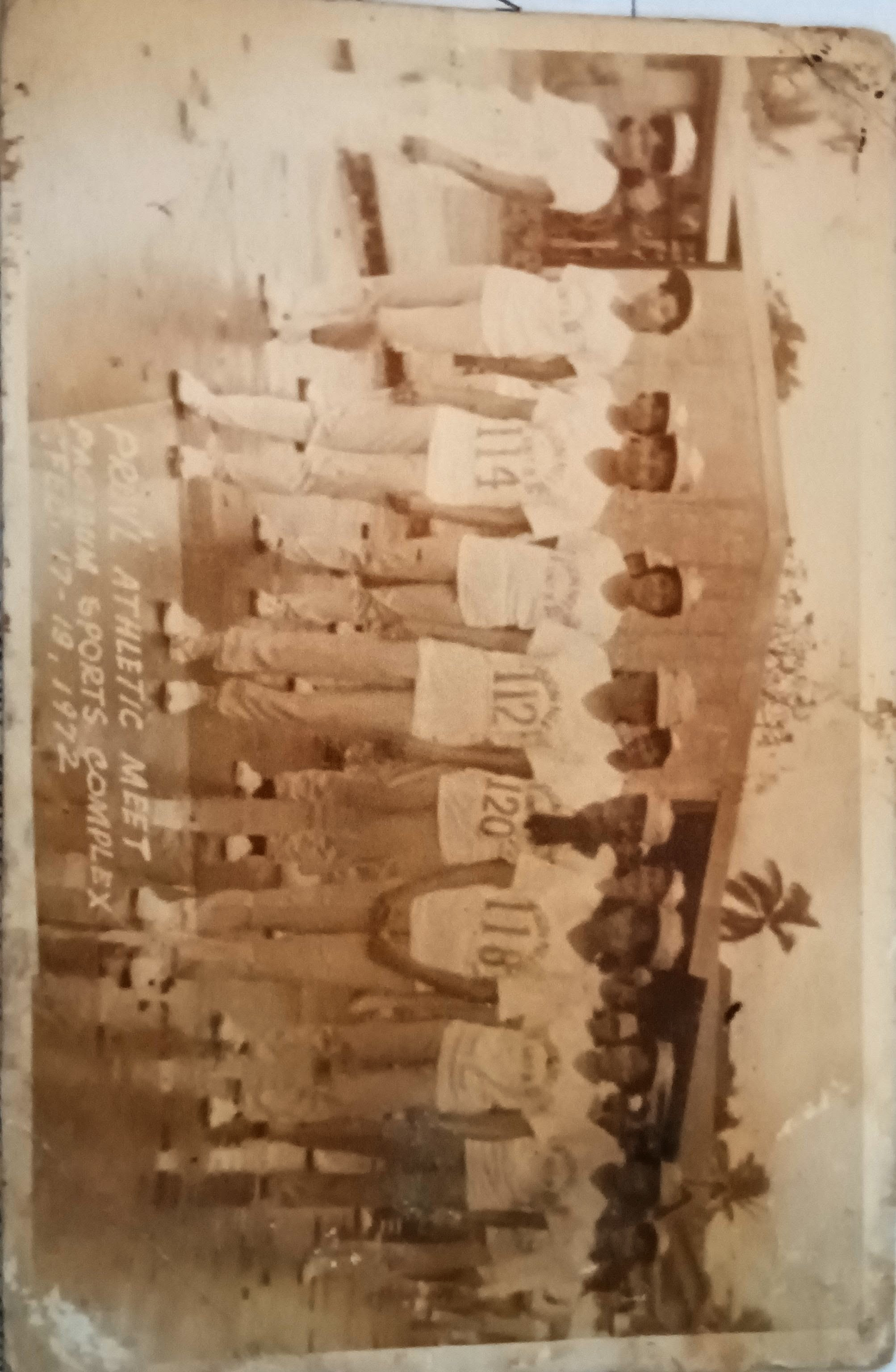
Alice Cusay Babiera at the Provincial Athletic Meet, 1972

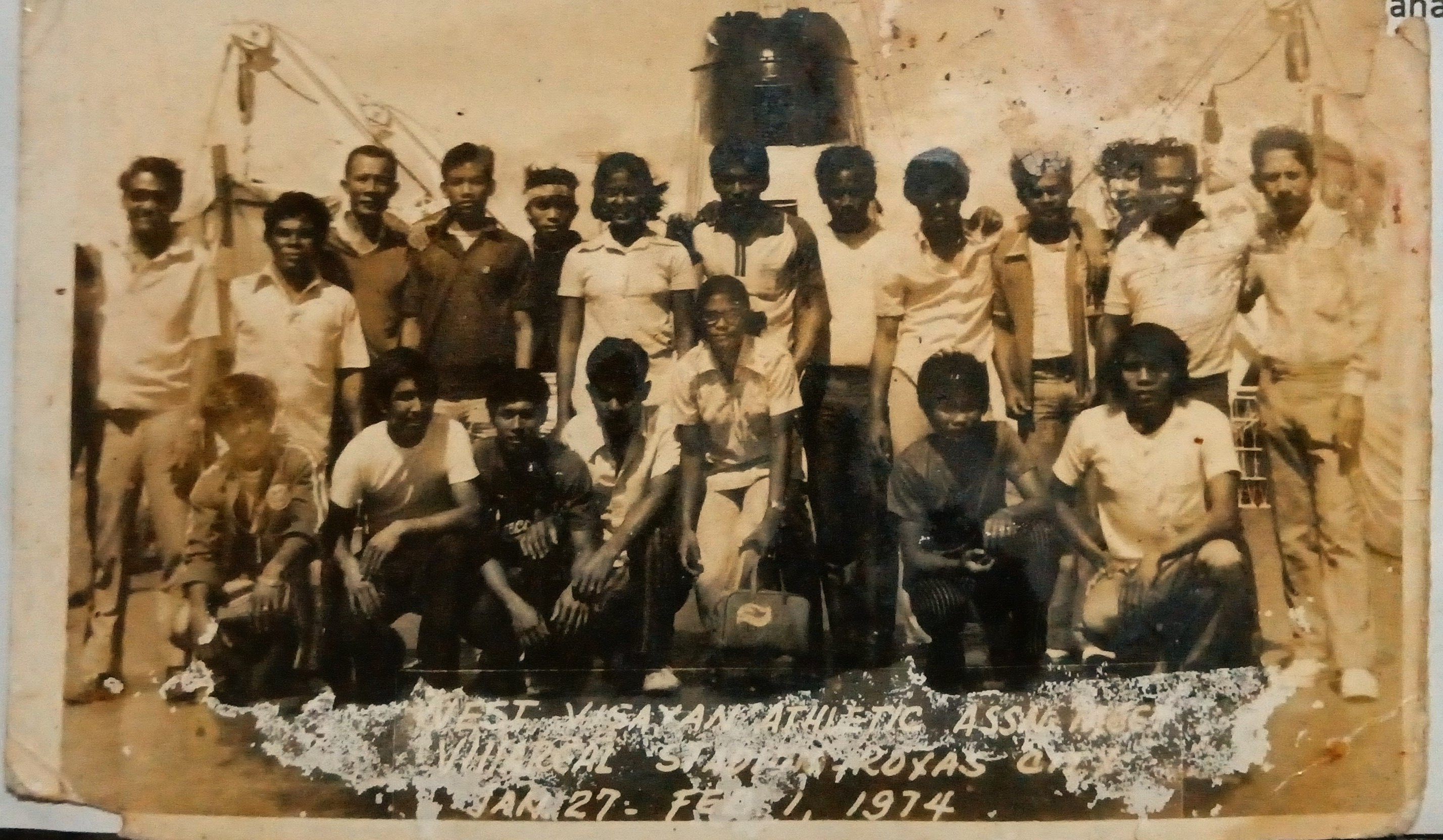
West Visayan Athletic Association Meet, Villareal Stadium, Roxas City, Jan 27–Feb 1, 1974. Alice Cusay Babiera is in the center holding a handbag.

She won gold medals in the 800 metres and 1,500 metres at the 1973 Palarong Pambansa in Davao, followed by a gold in the 400 metres in 1974, where she also set a new meet record.

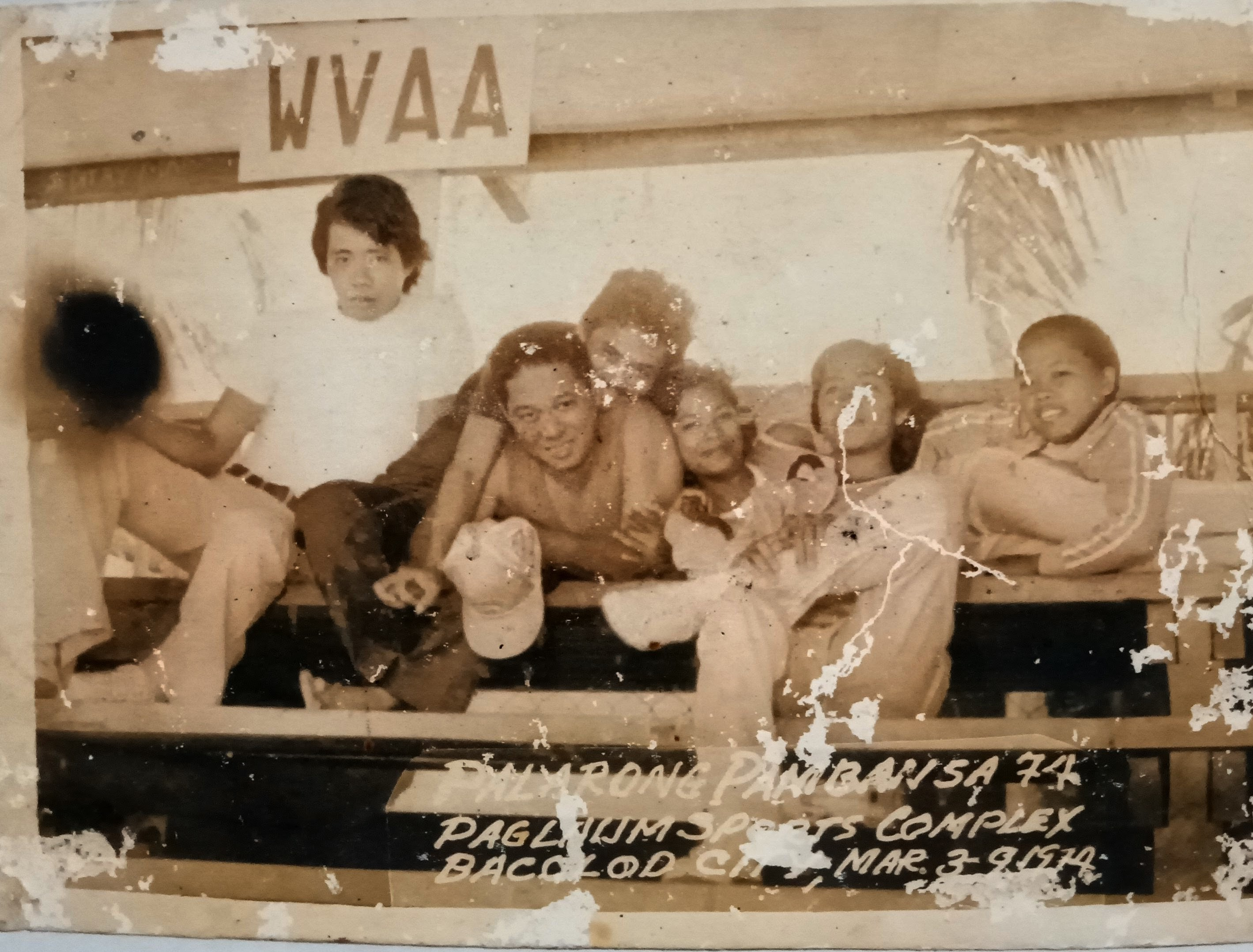
Alice Cusay Babiera (center) with WVAA teammates at Palarong Pambansa 1974, Paglaum Sports Complex, Bacolod

She held the Palarong Pambansa record in the 1,500 metres for three years and represented the Philippines internationally.

=== Volleyball career ===
Aside from track and field, Babiera also played volleyball. She was part of the championship team at the Independence Day Volleyball Tournament held in Bacolod City on June 12, 1977.

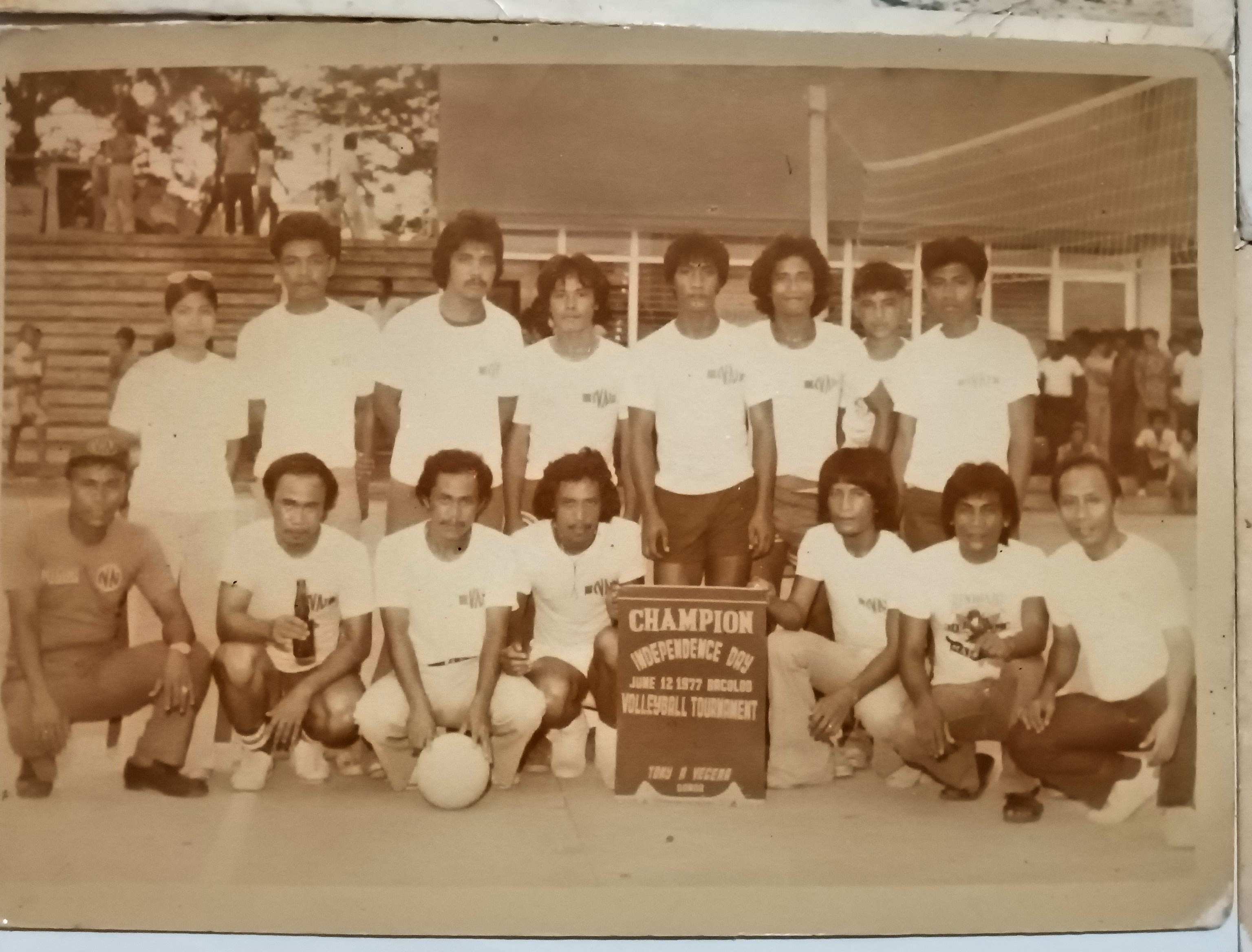
Alice Cusay Babiera (rightmost, with shades) with her volleyball team, 1977

== Public service and coaching ==
After retiring from competition, Babiera coached at Colegio de San Agustin-Bacolod, where she facilitated seminar-workshops on track and field training for the Department of Education, Culture and Sports (DECS) program.

In 1991, she participated in the Akbayan '91 Southeast Asian Games Torch Run as part of the Bacolod-Sagay stage. In 1994, she sought sponsorship to compete in the international master's championship in Oregon, United States.
