= 2014 Palarong Pambansa =

Multi-sports competition

57th Palarong Pambansa
- Host city: Santa Cruz, Laguna (main)
- Country: Philippines
- Motto: Sports is a way of life
- Athletes: estimated 10,000
- Events: 20 sports
- Opening: 04 May
- Closing: 10 May
- Main venue: Laguna Sports Complex, Santa Cruz, Laguna; Pila, Laguna; Los Baños, Laguna
- Ceremony venue: San Luis Sports Complex
- Website: www.palaro2014laguna.com

The 2014 Palarong Pambansa (also known as the 2014 PALARO) is the 57th edition of the annual multi-sporting event for Filipino student-athletes. Held in Santa Cruz, Laguna last 10–16 May 2014.

12,000 student-athletes from 17 regions of the Philippines joined this year's Palaro as they compete in various sports.

== Bidding ==
Five provinces bid for 2014 Palarong Pambansa. These are Laguna, Batangas, Mindoro, Palawan at Marikina. The province of Laguna is the strongest bidder among the five provinces. Last 23 October 2013, the DepEd or Department of Education held a meeting to announce the host of 2014 Palaro. It was the province of Laguna that was awarded for the hosting of 2014 Palarong Pambansa by the Department of Education regional directors. It was the first time of Laguna to host the Palarong Pambansa and expected to have a grand opening ceremony.

On the other hand, of the same meeting, the city of Marikina was selected to host the 6th ASEAN School Games.

2014 Palarong Pambansa
City/Municipality	Province/Region
Santa Cruz	Laguna
Batangas City	Batangas
Marikina	National Capital Region
Puerto Princesa	Palawan

Winning bid

== Sports ==
The 2014 Palarong Pambansa will feature 17 sports plus the 3 demonstration sports from last year . The 57th edition of the games may introduce wrestling as part of the grassroot program of Philippine Sports Commission. THE Wrestling Association of the Philippines (WAP) will promote the sport in schools nationwide after the Department of Education (DepEd) included wrestling in the 2014 Palarong Pambansa program. President Aquino signed Republic Act 10588, an act institutionalizing the conduct of the Palarong Pambansa, with wrestling as one of the medal sports.

- Archery
- Arnis
- Aquatics
- Athletics (sport)
- Badminton
- Baseball
- Billiards¹
- Boxing
- Chess
- Football
- Futsal¹
- Gymnastics
- Sepak takraw
- Softball
- Table tennis
- Taekwondo
- Tennis
- Volleyball
- Wrestling*
- Wushu¹

Note:

¹ – demonstration sports in 2013 Palarong Pambansa
(*) – new sport at the 2014 Palarong Pambansa

== Opening ==
The opening ceremonies held last 5 May 2014 at the Laguna Sports Complex in Santa Cruz, Laguna, the host venue of the competition. Leading the torch relay of the opening are Filipino ice skater Michael Martinez, basketball players Jeron Teng and Jeric Teng, former swimmer and actor Enchong Dee, and DLSU track & field team captain Jerico Ejercito. Boxing champion Manny Pacquiao did not make it to the event due to the birth of Israel Pacquiao, his & Jinkee's newest baby. Laguna governor E.R. Ejercito together with Manila mayor Joseph Estrada also leads the unveiling of 26-foot-tall monument of Jose Rizal as an Eskrima swordsman, making it the tallest Rizal monument in the world.

== Participating regions ==
Host Region

Regions		No. of Participants		
Code	Name	Athletes	Officials	Total
ARMMAA	Autonomous Region in Muslim Mindanao			
CAR	Cordillera Administrative Region			
NCR	National Capital Region			
IRAA	Region I or Ilocos Region			
CAVRAA	Region II or Cagayan Valley			
CLRAA	Region III or Central Luzon			
STCAA	Region IV-A or Southern Tagalog – Calabarzon			
Mimaropa	Region IV-B or Southern Tagalog – Mimaropa			
BRAA	Region V or Bicol Region			
WVRAA	Region VI or Western Visayas			
CVRAA	Region VII Central Visayas			
EVRAA	Region VIII or Eastern Visayas			
ZPRAA	Region IX or Zamboanga Peninsula			
NMRAA	Region X or Northern Mindanao			
DAVRAA	Region XI or Davao Region			
CRAA	Region XII or Soccsksargen			
Caraga	Region XIII or Caraga			

== Final Medal Tally ==
=== Regular Sports ===
* Host nation (Host region)

Rank	Region	Gold	Silver	Bronze	Total
1	National Capital Region (NCR)	107	64	56	227
2	Calabarzon / STCAA (Region IV-A)*	38	51	51	140
3	Western Visayas (Region VI)	32	33	38	103
4	Central Visayas (Region VII)	24	27	41	92
5	Cordillera Administrative Region (CAR)	24	11	12	47
6	Northern Mindanao (Region X)	21	21	31	73
7	Soccsksargen (Region XII)	15	17	30	62
8	Davao Region (Region XI)	10	20	21	51
9	Bicol (Region V)	9	6	22	37
10	Central Luzon (Region III)	8	11	22	41
11	Ilocos (Region I)	8	9	14	31
12	Caraga (Region XIII)	5	8	9	22
13	Cagayan Valley (Region II)	4	13	11	28
14	Eastern Visayas (Region VIII)	4	8	8	20
15	Mimaropa (Region IV-B)	4	5	11	20
16	Autonomous Region in Muslim Mindanao (ARMM)	1	1	4	6
17	Zamboanga Peninsula (Region IX)	0	5	10	15
Totals (17 entries)		314	310	391	1,015

=== Demonstration Sports ===
* Host nation (Host Region)

Rank	Nation	Gold	Silver	Bronze	Total
1	Zamboanga Peninsula (Region IX)	9	4	3	16
2	Central Visayas (Region VII)	6	6	6	18
3	Cordillera Administrative Region (CAR)	5	3	8	16
4	Ilocos (Region I)	5	3	3	11
5	Western Visayas (Region VI)	4	7	10	21
6	Davao Region (Region XI)	4	6	5	15
7	Soccsksargen (Region XII)	4	0	3	7
8	National Capital Region (NCR)	3	0	3	6
9	Eastern Visayas (Region VIII)	2	5	6	13
10	Caraga (Region XIII)	2	3	1	6
11	Bicol (Region V)	1	3	3	7
12	Calabarzon / STCAA (Region IV-A)*	1	3	1	5
13	Northern Mindanao (Region X)	1	2	2	5
14	Central Luzon (Region III)	1	0	2	3
15	Cagayan Valley (Region II)	0	2	4	6
16	Mimaropa (Region IV-B)	0	1	1	2
17	Autonomous Region in Muslim Mindanao (ARMM)	0	0	7	7
Totals (17 entries)		48	48	68	164

=== Special Games ===
* Host nation (Host region)

Rank	Nation	Gold	Silver	Bronze	Total
1	Calabarzon / STCAA (Region IV-A)*	15	19	4	38
2	Davao Region (Region XI)	10	12	7	29
3	Ilocos (Region I)	8	6	9	23
4	Western Visayas (Region VI)	8	4	5	17
5	Cordillera Administrative Region (CAR)	5	2	2	9
6	National Capital Region (NCR)	4	7	7	18
7	Zamboanga Peninsula (Region IX)	4	2	2	8
8	Central Luzon (Region III)	2	2	1	5
9	Soccsksargen (Region XII)	1	2	3	6
10	Central Visayas (Region VII)	1	1	4	6
11	Northern Mindanao (Region X)	1	0	4	5
12	Cagayan Valley (Region II)	0	2	0	2
13	Bicol (Region V)	0	0	3	3
14	Caraga (Region XIII)	0	0	1	1
Totals (14 entries)		59	59	52	170

== Point System by DepEd ==
Rank	Region	Elementary (Pts)	Secondary (Pts)	Total Points
1	National Capital Region (NCRAA)	0	0	0
2	Region VI – WVRAA	0	0	0
3	Region VII – CVRAA	0	0	0
4	Region X – NMRAA	0	0	0
5	Region 4A – STCAA / Calabarzon	0	0	0
6	Region III – CLRAA	0	0	0
7	Region XII – CRAA / SOCCKSARGEN	0	0	0
8	Region I – IRAA	0	0	0
9	Region 4B – Mimaropa	0	0	0
10	Region CAR – CARRAA	0	0	0
11	Region XI – DAVRAA	0	0	0
12	Region V – BRAA	0	0	0
13	Caraga – CARAGAA	0	0	0
14	Region IX – ZPRAA	0	0	0
15	ARMM – ARMRAA	0	0	0
16	Region II – CAVRAA	0	0	0
17	Region VIII – EVRAA	0	0	0
