= Table tennis at the 2013 Palarong Pambansa =

Table tennis events at the 2013 Palarong Pambansa were held in Praxevilla Tennis Court, SU Tennis Center and YMCA. A total of eight events took place. Below are the winners.

== Medal summary ==
=== Medal table ===
* Host nation (Region VII - CVIRAA)

Rank	Team	Gold	Silver	Bronze	Total
1	Region VI - WVRAA	5	2	3	10
2	Region X - NMRAA	1	2	1	4
3	Region VII - CVIRAA*	1	1	1	3
4	Region XII - CRAA	1	0	2	3
5	NCR - NCRAA	0	2	6	8
6	Region 4A - CALABARZON	0	1	1	2
7	CARAGA - CARAGAA	0	0	1	1
7	Region IX - ZPRAA	0	0	1	1
Totals (8 entries)		8	8	16	32

=== Elementary Division ===
Event	Gold	Silver	Bronze
Men's Singles	Reynaldo Templado Jr. (Region XII - CRAA)	Kian Patrick Bolando (NCR - NCRAA)	Allan Noel Gayoso (Region VI - WVRAA)
Men's Singles	Reynaldo Templado Jr. (Region XII - CRAA)	Kian Patrick Bolando (NCR - NCRAA)	Neo Angelo Laudato (Region 4A - CALABARZON)
Women's Singles	Ann Gella Borbon (Region VI - WVRAA)	Jannah Maryam Romero (NCR - NCRAA)	Emery Faith Digamon (Region IX - ZPRAA)
Women's Singles	Ann Gella Borbon (Region VI - WVRAA)	Jannah Maryam Romero (NCR - NCRAA)	Edria Garganian (Region VI - WVRAA)
Men's Team Event	Region VII - CVIRAA; Amiel Jon Aroma; Joseph Credo; Jayvee Aong; LLoyd Kyle Lebosada	Region 4A - CALABARZON; Craig Darryl Dalisay; Manny Aniceto de Leon IV; Mcleen Koseil Dizon; Neo Angelo Laudato	NCR - NCRAA; Kian Patrick Bolando; Christian L.J. Crisostomo; Riuc Arc Marcelino; Luke Jeremiah Reyes
Men's Team Event	Region VII - CVIRAA; Amiel Jon Aroma; Joseph Credo; Jayvee Aong; LLoyd Kyle Lebosada	Region 4A - CALABARZON; Craig Darryl Dalisay; Manny Aniceto de Leon IV; Mcleen Koseil Dizon; Neo Angelo Laudato	Region VI - WVRAA; Areanel Theofer Ariola; Allan Noel Gayoso; Niel John Lauren; Elmer Locsin Jr.
Women's Team Event	Region VI - WVRAA; Ann Gella Borbon; Edria Garganian; Jesselene Emille Mallen; Alyssa Toleco	Region X - NMRAA; Jhastine Mae Catura; Kyneshi Jan Draug; Tristan Jane dela Cruz; Sheila Marie Manzano	Region XII - CRAA; Mylene Janelher Alonto; Liezl Joy Canada; Rose Ann Garay; Antonitte Blesh Luna
Women's Team Event	Region VI - WVRAA; Ann Gella Borbon; Edria Garganian; Jesselene Emille Mallen; Alyssa Toleco	Region X - NMRAA; Jhastine Mae Catura; Kyneshi Jan Draug; Tristan Jane dela Cruz; Sheila Marie Manzano	NCR - NCRAA; Leslie Alcantara; Lyane Ruth Chavez; Anna Sophia Fabregar; Jannah Maryam Romero

=== Secondary Division ===
Event	Gold	Silver	Bronze
Men's Singles	Vince Oliva (Region VI - WVRAA)	Peter June dela Riarte (Region VI - WVRAA)	Jethro Gapas (NCR - NCRAA)
Men's Singles	Vince Oliva (Region VI - WVRAA)	Peter June dela Riarte (Region VI - WVRAA)	Vence Flores (Region VII - CVIRAA)
Women's Singles	Princess Jan Draug (Region X - NMRAA)	Beverly Paulma (Region VI - WVRAA)	Melody Intong (Region XII - CRAA)
Women's Singles	Princess Jan Draug (Region X - NMRAA)	Beverly Paulma (Region VI - WVRAA)	Richanda Ann Ching (NCR - NCRAA)
Men's Team Event	Region VI - WVRAA; Peter June dela Riarte; Adrian Garrido; John Nino Gayoso; Vince Oliva	Region VII - CVIRAA; Francis Acaso; Jean Phillippe Honorodez; Vence Flores; Jerome Impuesto	NCR - NCRAA; Koby Jaiguro Cabrido; Carl Joseph Carrasco; Jethro Gapas; John Roizz Pansacula
Men's Team Event	Region VI - WVRAA; Peter June dela Riarte; Adrian Garrido; John Nino Gayoso; Vince Oliva	Region VII - CVIRAA; Francis Acaso; Jean Phillippe Honorodez; Vence Flores; Jerome Impuesto	Region X - NMRAA; Serjun Benoya; Serknight Benoya; Rey Paulo Lamayan; Justin Paul Pacana
Women's Team Event	Region VI - WVRAA; Airah Alzado; Beverly Paulma; Shamiela Pineda; Marjo Grace Saldajeno	Region X - NMRAA; Razel Apag; Princess Jan Draug; Reigan Mae Gabutin; Katrina Tempiatura	NCR - NCRAA; Richanda Ann Ching; Samantha Marie Ingeniero; Mikaella Ricanor; Ma. Angelica Sanchez
Women's Team Event	Region VI - WVRAA; Airah Alzado; Beverly Paulma; Shamiela Pineda; Marjo Grace Saldajeno	Region X - NMRAA; Razel Apag; Princess Jan Draug; Reigan Mae Gabutin; Katrina Tempiatura	Region XIII- CARAGA; Jacquilyn Arcayena; Karein Buendia; Himaya Campos; Jenesel Rabaya
