= 2016 Palarong Pambansa =

Multi-sports competition

59th Palarong Pambansa
- Host city: Legazpi, Albay (main)
- Country: Philippines
- Motto: Transforming Communities, Transcending through K to 12
- Teams: 18 regional athletic associations
- Athletes: 14,000+ athletes
- Opening: 10 April
- Closing: 16 April
- Opened by: Secretary of Education Armin Luistro
- Torch lighter: Terrence Romeo; Francis Everisto
- Main venue: Bicol University Sports Complex
- Broadcast partners: ABS-CBN Sports and Action Channel 23 and ABS-CBN Sports and Action HD
- Website: albaypalaro2016.com

The 2016 Palarong Pambansa was the 59th edition of the annual multi-sporting event for Filipino student-athletes. Athletic associations from the country's 18 regions were competed in different sporting events and discipline. The games were held at the Bicol University Sports Complex, in Albay Province, from April 10–16, 2016.

Negros Island Region which was created in 2015, participated for the first time in the Palarong Pambansa as a region.

== Bidding ==
Albay, Baguio-Benguet, and Cagayan submitted a bid to host the games. The hosts of the games were originally set to be announced in June 2015 but the Department of Education announced that the Palarong Pambansa board will convene in August 2016 regarding the hosts of the 2016 edition.

After losing their bid to host the 2014 Palarong Pambansa, Baguio and Benguet made a joint bid for the 2016 edition of the games. The Baguio Athletic Bowl and the Benguet Sports Complex in Wangal, La Trinidad were touted as one of the venues of the games.

In October 2015, the DepED, together with the Philippine Sports Commission formally awarded the hosting rights of the 2016 Palarong Pambansa to Albay province. Albay won the bidding, against Cagayan province. On January 25, 2016, the Albay government and the Department of Education signed a memorandum of agreement for the formal staging of the games.

2017 Palarong Pambansa bids
City/Municipality	Province/Region
Legazpi	Albay/R-5
Baguio	Benguet/Cordillera Region
Tuguegarao	Cagayan/R-2

Winning bid

== Plan for the games ==
Albay's bid includes plans to make a new sports facility, the Albay Sports Complex to be constructed in Guinobatan as the main venue of the games. Two newly constructed swimming pools and a tennis court will be used, while several indoor sporting events will be held in St. Agnes Academy, Aquinas University and Divine Word College in Legazpi.

The games will also be promoted as a sports tourism event, the first time in the history of the sporting tournament. Aside from the Palarong Pambansa, Albay will also host the Albay Xterra Off-Road Triathlon and Le Tour de Filipinas on February and the Mayon 360° Ultra Marathon on April. Sports venues will be spread out throughout the province of Albay to promote local tourism.

Governor Joey Salceda, said that the province will be spending 450 million pesos budget for the construction of the playing venues before the opening ceremony of the 2016 Palaro.

Milo has also committed for the sponsorship in the 2016 Palarong Pambansa.

=== Media and television coverage ===
The live television coverage of the 2016 Palarong Pambansa were broadcast on ABS-CBN Sports and Action. ABS-CBN forged an historical partnership agreement with the Local Government of Albay and the DepEd for the live coverage of the Palarong Pambansa on April 5, 2016 at the ELJ Communications Center in the network's compound in Quezon City.

As part of the signed agreement, the network committed to air the games and events of the 9-day athletic meet (except during the gamedays of the UAAP, on which will be aired on a primetime slot), particularly in Basketball and Volleyball, on both ABS-CBN Sports and Action Channel 23 and ABS-CBN Sports and Action HD Channel 166 (on SkyCable), including the opening ceremonies on April 10. They will also produce a documentary, featurettes and interviews with the past athletes who started their athletic career in the Palarong Pambansa as part of the network's continuous mission on sports development.

PBN Broadcasting Network, Inc.'s Legazpi-based AM radio station DZGB 729 kHz has also provided the live and blow-by-blow coverage of the proceedings of the Palarong Pambansa 2016. Myx is also aired coverage of the Palarong Pambansa 2016 via Channel 66 Naga and Channel 56 Legazpi.

=== Sports ===
In this year's Palaro, there will be 1,095 medals to be given away to the winners and the runners-up in the following sporting disciplines to be contested in the competition. These are 151 golds, 151 silvers and 183 golds in the elementary division, while 187 golds, 187 silvers and 236 golds in the secondary division.

==== Regular Games ====
- Archery
- Arnis
- Aquatics
- Athletics
- Badminton
- Baseball
- Basketball
- Boxing
- Chess
- Football
- Gymnastics
- Sepak takraw (Boys)
- Softball
- Table tennis
- Taekwondo
- Tennis
- Volleyball

==== Demonstration Games ====
These are the demonstration sports for this year's Palarong Pambansa. Deped Assistant Secretary Tonisito Umali, as stated in an interview that the organizing committee will evaluate all 5 demo sports whether they will elevated their status into a regular sport or it will scrapped instead.

- Billiards
- Futsal
- Sepak takraw (Girls)
- Wrestling
- Wushu

=== Participating regions ===
With the inclusion of the Negros Island Region, a total of 18 regions will be participating in the 7-day athletic meet.

Host Region

Regions			No. of Participants		
Code	Regional Athletic Association Name	Region	Athletes	Officials	Total
ARMMAA	Autonomous Region in Muslim Mindanao Athletic Association	Autonomous Region in Muslim Mindanao			
CARAA	Cordillera Administrative Region Athletic Association	Cordillera Administrative Region			
NCRAA	National Capital Region Athletic Association	National Capital Region			
RIAA	Region I Athletic Association	Region I or Ilocos Region			
CaVRAA	Cagayan Valley Regional Athletic Association	Region II or Cagayan Valley			
CLRAA	Central Luzon Regional Athletic Association	Region III or Central Luzon			
STCAA	Southern Tagalog - Calabarzon Athletic Association	Region IV-A or Southern Tagalog – Calabarzon			
MRAA	Mimaropa Regional Athletic Association	Region IV-B or Southern Tagalog – Mimaropa			
BRAA	Bicol Regional Athletic Association	Region V or Bicol Region			
WVRAA	Western Visayas Regional Athletic Association	Region VI or Western Visayas			
NIRAA	Negros Island Regional Athletic Association	Region XVIII or Negros Island Region			
CVRAA	Central Visayas Regional Athletic Association	Region VII Central Visayas			
EVRAA	Eastern Visayas Regional Athletic Association	Region VIII or Eastern Visayas			
ZPRAA	Zamboanga Peninsula Regional Athletic Association	Region IX or Zamboanga Peninsula			
NMRAA	Northern Mindanao Regional Athletic Association	Region X or Northern Mindanao			
DavRAA	Davao Regional Athletic Association	Region XI or Davao Region			
SRAA	Soccsksargen Regional Athletic Association	Region XII or Soccsksargen			
CARAGARAA	Caraga Regional Athletic Association	Region XIII or Caraga			

== Playing Venues ==
27 sporting venues for 21 sports disciplines will be used for the entire duration of the 2016 Palarong Pambansa in Albay. Those venues are located in Legazpi, the province's capital and four municipalities, Camalig, Daraga Guinobatan and Sto. Domingo. Aside from the venues, 18 billeting centers for the athletes and technical officials scattered along Guinobatan, Camalig, Daraga, Sto. Domingo, Ligao, Bacacay, and Legazpi will be used.

As of March 12, 2016:

Camalig

- Camalig Gymnasium - Table Tennis (Boys/Girls - Secondary/Elementary)
- Provincial Engineering Office - Archery (Secondary)

Daraga

- Bagumbayan Covered Court - Sepak Takraw (Juniors)
- Bicol College Gymnasium - Volleyball (Boys/Girls - Secondary/Elementary)
- BUCENG Gymnasium - Volleyball (Boys/Girls - Secondary/Elementary)
- Daraga Covered Court - Sepak Takraw (Seniors / Girls)
- Sunshine International School Gymnasium - Basketball (Girls - Secondary)
- United Institute – Goalball

Guinobatan

- Albay Provincial Sports Center - Football (Boys - Elementary)
- Arandungan Hall - Wrestling (Boys/Girls - Secondary)
- BUCAF Tennis Court - Tennis (Boys/Girls - Secondary/Elementary)
- Guinobatan Covered Court - Futsal (Girls - Secondary)
- Ohhlala Resort Tennis Court – Tennis (Boys/Girls - Secondary/Elementary)

Legazpi City

- Albay Astrodome - Badminton (Boys/Girls - Secondary/Elementary)
- Albay Ligñon Hill Tennis Court - Tennis (Boys/Girls - Secondary/Elementary)
- Albay Sports and Tourism Complex - Opening and closing ceremonies
  - ASTC Track Oval – Athletics (Boys/Girls - Secondary/Elementary / Special Games)
  - ASTC Swimming Pool – Swimming (Boys/Girls - Secondary/Elementary / Special Games)
- Aquinas Dome - Taekwando (Boys/Girls - Secondary/Elementary)
- Ayala Mall Legazpi - Billiards (Boys/Girls - Secondary)
- Aquinas University of Legazpi Student Pavilion - Chess (Secondary/Elementary)
- Bicol University Football Field - Football (Boys - Secondary)
- BU Research and Development Center – Bocce
- BU Institute of Architecture – Shot Put
- DENR Gymnasium - Volleyball (Boys/Girls - Secondary/Elementary)
- DPWH 2nd District Engineering Office Gymnasium - Volleyball (Boys/Girls - Secondary/Elementary)
- Divine Word College of Legazpi High School Gymnasium - Arnis (Boys/Girls - Secondary/Elementary)
- Hotel St. Ellis - Wushu (Boys/Girls - Secondary)
- Ibalong Centrum for Recreation - Basketball (Boys - Secondary)
- Peñaranda Park - Boxing (Boys - Secondary)
- Sagrada Familia Gymnasium - Basketball (Boys - Elementary)
- St. Agnes Academy - Gymnastics (Boys/Girls - Secondary/Elementary)

Sto. Domingo

- Mayon Rivera Subdivision - Baseball (Boys - Secondary/Elementary), Softball (Boys - Secondary/Elementary)
- Sto. Domingo Basketball Court - Basketball (Girls - Secondary)

== Competition proper ==
=== Opening ceremonies ===
Before the opening ceremonies, a torch relay was conducted from April 8, 2016 until the opening day.

The opening ceremony was held on April 10, 2016 at the Albay Sports and Tourism Complex, that was lasted for two hours. The program was hosted by ABS-CBN Sports and Action anchor TJ Manotoc. One of the main parts of the afternoon program was the grand parade of more than 14,000 student-athletes from 18 regions competing in the Palarong Pambansa. The athletes, then sang "Sulong Sa Tagumpay Atletang Pinoy" (Onward to the Victories of Filipino Athletes), the 2016 Palarong Pambansa Hymn, composed by Francisco Bulalacao, Jr.

Among those who have given the welcoming remarks during the event are Legazpi City Mayor Noel Rosal, Daraga Mayor Gerry Jaucian and Deped Region 5 Director Ramon Fiel Abcede. Former Secretary of Justice Leila de Lima and Manila vice mayor Isko Moreno, who both senatorial candidates were present in the opening ceremonies. The Palarong Pambansa banner was turn-over from the officials of the 2015 host province Davao del Norte to Albay governor Joey Salceda and Abcede. Education secretary Armin Luistro formally opens the affair. During the event, a skydiver from the Philippine Air Force was injured and rushed to the hospital after the accidental landing of his parachute into a swimming pool.

GlobalPort Batang Pier basketball player Terrence Romeo and Francis Everesto, the first person-with-disability (PWD) torchbearer in the competition's history, formally lit the cauldron with a friendship urn, signifying the start of the 2016 Palarong Pambansa in Albay. The ceremony ended with a fireworks display.

== Medals ==
=== Regular Games ===
As of 16 April 2016, 12:55 (UTC+8)

Rank	Nation	Gold	Silver	Bronze	Total
1	National Capital Region (NCRAA)	104	57	48	209
2	Calabarzon/Southern Tagalog (STCAA)	40	43	59	142
3	Western Visayas (WVRAA)	35	35	39	109
4	Central Visayas (CVRAA)	29	31	29	89
5	Northern Mindanao (NMRAA)	25	24	36	85
6	Negros Island Region (NIRAA)	21	28	39	88
7	Soccsksargen (SRAA)	20	20	29	69
8	Central Luzon (CLRAA)	17	14	28	59
9	Cordillera Administrative Region (CARAA)	12	19	15	46
10	Davao Region (DavRAA)	8	18	19	45
11	Bicol Region (BRAA)	8	5	18	31
12	Zamboanga Peninsula (ZPRAA)	6	7	15	28
13	Eastern Visayas (EVRAA)	6	3	9	18
14	Ilocos Region (RIAA)	5	11	21	37
15	Mimaropa (MRAA)	5	7	7	19
16	Cagayan Valley (CaVRAA)	4	9	8	21
17	Autonomous Region in Muslim Mindanao (ARMMAA)	3	4	10	17
18	Caraga (CARAGARAA)	1	5	11	17
Totals (18 entries)		349	340	440	1,129
