= National Academy of Sports =

Government sports academy in Tarlac, Philippines

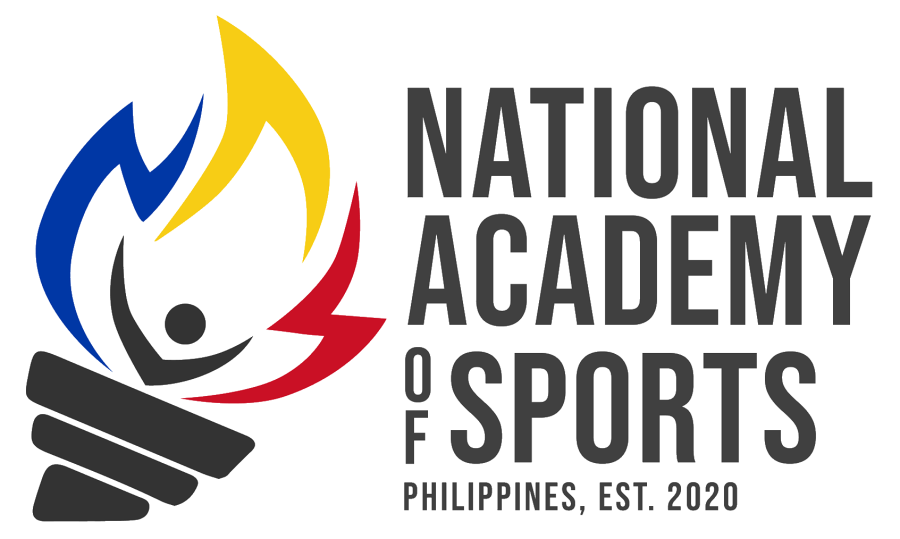

- NAS campus in 2022

Location
- New Clark City Sports Complex, Capas, Tarlac; Philippines; 15°20′33″N 120°32′17″E

Information
- Established: June 9, 2020
- Authority: Department of Education
- Board chair (concurrent Education Secretary): Sonny Angara
- Executive Director: Josephine Joy Reyes
- Enrollment: 52 (September 2021)
- Area: 25,000 m^{2} (270,000 sq ft)
- Nickname: NAS Excel Lions

The National Academy of Sports (NAS) is a government-run sports academy managed by the Philippine government which has its main campus at the New Clark City Sports Complex in Capas, Tarlac.

== History ==
The National Academy of Sports system was established with the signing of Republic Act No. 11470 on June 9, 2020, by President Rodrigo Duterte. The NAS is a body attached to the Department of Education.

The main campus was set up at the New Clark City Sports Complex in Capas, Tarlac.

Josephine Joy Reyes was appointed as the NAS system's first executive director in October 2020. The first set of officials for the NAS system had their oath-taking in May 2021.

In July 2021, the NAS launched its first NAS Annual Search for Competent, Exceptional, Notable and Talented Student-Athlete Scholars (NASCENT SAS), an annual scholarship program which would scout Filipino student-athletes from across the Philippines.

The NAS' first academic year officially started on September 13, 2021. Due to the COVID-19 pandemic, classes will be initially and primarily done virtually. The construction for the Phase I of the dedicated campus for the NAS in New Clark City began in early October 2021. It was scheduled to be completed by February 2022, then extended to August 2023.

The first batch of students graduated in April 2025.

== Campus ==
President Bongbong Marcos inspecting the facilities

The dedicated campus for the NAS has an academic and administration building as well as a multipurpose gymnasium.

== Academic program ==
The NAS intends to provide secondary education program with a curriculum intended to improve its students performance in sports. Natural-born qualified athletes will be granted full scholarship. The NAS has plans to cooperate with the Philippine Sports Commission and would be allowed to hire foreign coaches as part of its staff. Para-athletes will also be accommodated by the school system.

The NAS sources its students through its NAS Annual Search for Competent, Exceptional, Notable and Talented Student-Athlete Scholars (NASCENT SAS) scholarship program which scouts Filipino student-athletes from across the Philippines.

The initial program will cover eight sports:

- Aquatics
- Athletics
- Badminton
- Gymnastics
- Judo
- Table tennis
- Taekwondo
- Weightlifting

== Administration ==
The members of the Board of Trustees are:

Role	Name	Concurrent position / Notes
Chairperson	Sonny Angara	Secretary of Education
Vice Chairperson	Patrick Gregorio	Chairman of the Philippine Sports Commission
Member	Josephine Joy Reyes	Executive Director of the NAS System
Member	Abraham Tolentino	President of the Philippine Olympic Committee
Member	Prospero de Vera III	Chairperson of the Commission on Higher Education
Member	Arrey A. Perez	Representative from the private sector
Member	Cynthia Ann Tiu	Representative from the private sector

== Competitive sports ==
The NAS has been sending athletes to the Palarong Pambansa, the national games for student-athletes in the Philippines albeit they are limited to competing in individual sports. They debuted at the 2024 Palarong Pambansa. In the 2025 edition, they adopted the moniker, NAS Excel Lions.
