= 2013 Palarong Pambansa =

Multi-sports competition

56th Palarong Pambansa
- Host city: Dumaguete, Negros Oriental
- Country: Philippines
- Motto: "Sports: Road to Peace and Progress"
- Athletes: estimated 10,000
- Events: 399 events in 17 sports
- Opening: April 21, 2013
- Closing: April 27, 2013
- Ceremony venue: Gov. Mariano Perdices Memorial Stadium, Dumaguete, Negros Oriental

The 2013 Palarong Pambansa, also known as the 2013 PALARO, was the 56th edition of the annual multi-sporting event, held in Dumaguete, Philippines, from April 21 to 27, 2013. Around 10,000 student athletes from 17 regions of the Philippines competed for the tournament, while the announced gold medalists and record breakers of this year received cash prizes for the first time. The motto for this edition was Sports: Road to Peace and Progress, promoting education, health, development and peace.

== Background ==
In its 56 years, it was the first time for the biggest sporting event for student athletes in the Philippines to be held and hosted by Dumaguete. In addition, it was also the first time in its history that the private sector offered financial rewards and scholarships to those who performed exceptionally. Furthermore, some college and university sport officials and coaches were scouting for their future athletes during the event.

== Bidding ==
On October 13, the officials of Department of Education and the Philippine Sports Commission have had a tedious selection and deliberation process of deciding where to host the 2013 event, taking into consideration the presentations made and the reports provided by the technical committee. The next month, the Department of Education officially gave the rights of hosting the 2013 Palarong Pambansa to Dumaguete after winning 11-7 votes for the province and a one-tied vote. There were 19 Palarong Pambansa Board Members who cast their votes.

== Venues ==
The opening and closing ceremonies of the 56th Palarong Pambansa were held at the Gov. Mariano Perdices Memorial Stadium, Dumaguete, Negros Oriental. Other venues are listed below:

Sport	Venue(s)
Archery	Ang Tay Golf Range
Arnis	Holy Cross High School Gym
Aquatics	LG Teves Aqua Center
Athletics	Mariano Perdices Memorial Coliseum Track & Field
Badminton	The Court - LP Hyper Mart
Baseball	Martinez Ball Park 1 & 2; Dr. Orbeta Ball Park Diamond 2 & 3; Siliman Heights Ball Park Diamond 1
Basketball	Lamberto L. Macias Sports Complex; Silliman University Gym; ABC Learning Center Gym
Boxing	Robinsons Place Atrium - Dumaguete
Chess	DCCO Function Hall
Football	SU Cimafranca Ball Field; Perdices Coliseum Football Field; Foundation University Ball Field; SU Ravelo Field
Gymnastics	Negros Oriental State University Cultural Center
Sepak takraw	SLS-Don Bosco HS Gym; Catherina Cittadini HS Gym
Softball	Cimafranca Ball Park Diamond 1,2,3,4
Table Tennis	NOCC Plenary
Taekwondo	St. Paul University Dumaguete Gym
Tennis	Praxevilla Tennis Court; SU Tennis Center; YMCA
Volleyball	ACSAT Gym; FU-IYSP Gym (Main Court); FU-IYSP Children Court 1 & 2

== Broadcasting and media ==
The 56th edition of Palarong Pambansa became more known as it was partnered with the media for coverage and live updates of the sports events. PTV-4 or People's Television Network signed an agreement with the Department of Education to provide airtime as well as to telecast the daily events of the 2013 Palarong Pambansa highlights and updates. At the same time, the Department of Education teamed up with Rappler as its official social media partner for 2013. This is the second consecutive year for both PTV-4 and Rappler to cover the yearly sporting event after the first in Lingayen, Pangasinan in 2012.

On the other hand, the event's official website and Facebook pages were managed by the local events Secretariat headed by Mr. Adolf P. Aguilar, the general events coordinator of the Palarong Pambansa. For the media bureau, the student volunteers from Silliman University and Foundation University were the ones to manage. Aside from the Facebook fanpage ("Palarong Pambansa 2013") and the Twitter account (@DepEd_PH), which were updated every second, there was also the live streaming, courtesy of Ustream, to provide more coverage of the games.

A total of 200 ICT teachers in Negros Oriental were tapped to cover the various sporting events, making it the most photographed and most interactive Palarong Pambansa in history to date.

== Sports ==
The 2013 Palarong Pambansa featured 17 sports in the 368 events. The 56th edition of the games was historical because of its demonstration sports, which includes Futsal, billiards, and Wushu.

- Archery
- Aquatics
- Athletics
- Badminton
- Baseball
- Billiards^{1}
- Boxing
- Chess
- Football
- Futsal^{1}
- Gymnastics
- Sepak Takraw
- Softball
- Swimming
- Table Tennis
- Taekwondo
- Tennis
- Volleyball
- Wushu^{1}

^{1}demonstration sports

== Participating regions ==
Regions		No. of Participants		
Code	Name	Athletes	Officials	Total
ARMMAA	Autonomous Region in Muslim Mindanao	350	170	520
CAR	Cordillera Administrative Region	300+	100+	400+
NCR	National Capital Region	400+	100+	500+
IRAA	Region I or Ilocos Region	350	170	520
CAVRAA	Region II or Cagayan Valley	380	100+	500+
CLRAA	Region III or Central Luzon	400+	100+	500+
STCAA	Region IV-A or Southern Tagalog - Calabarzon	400+	150	556
MimaropaA	Region IV-B or Southern Tagalog - Mimaropa	416	190+	606
BRAA	Region V or Bicol Region	400+	100+	500+
WVRAA	Region VI or Western Visayas	400+	100+	500+
CVRAA	Region VII Central Visayas	493	150	643
EVRAA	Region VIII or Eastern Visayas	300+	100+	500+
ZPRAA	Region IX or Zamboanga Peninsula	339	183	522
NMRAA	Region X or Northern Mindanao	393	140+	533
DAVRAA	Region XI or Davao Region	300+	100+	500+
CRAA	Region XII or Soccsksargen	485	115	600
Caraga	Region XIII or Caraga	400+	100+	500+

Host Region

== Billeting locations ==
The seventeen participating regions of the 2013 Palarong Pambansa were housed in different billeting locations around Dumaguete city. Public and private schools served as the billeting areas for athletes and coaches including medical staff and teachers. Below are the billeting quarters during the game:

Regions		Locations
Code	Name	Billeting Quarters
ARMMAA	Autonomous Region in Muslim Mindanao	Silliman University, Hibbard Ave., Dumaguete
CAR	Cordillera Administrative Region	Dauin CS/NHSPoblacion, Dauin, Negros Oriental
NCR	National Capital Region	Dumaguete City HS, Brgy. Calindagan, Dumaguete
IRAA	Region I or Ilocos Region	Negros Oriental State University-Bajumpandan Campus, Brgy. Bajumpandan, Dumaguete
CAVRAA	Region II or Cagayan Valley	St. Paul University Dumaguete, Nat’l. Highway, Dumaguete
CLRAA	Region III or Central Luzon	Junob ES/HS, Brgy. Junob, Dumaguete
STCAA	Region IV-A or Southern Tagalog - Calabarzon	Amlan ES/HS, Nat’l. Highway, Amlan, Negros Oriental
MimaropaA	Region IV-B or Southern Tagalog - Mimaropa	South City ES / SLS-Don Bosco, Brgy. Mangnao-Canal, Dumaguete
BRAA	Region V or Bicol Region	Sibulan CS/NHS, Poblacion, Sibulan, Negros Oriental
WVRAA	Region VI or Western Visayas	West City ES, Cervantes St., Dumaguete
CVRAA	Region VII Central Visayas	Negros Oriental HS, Capitol Area, Dumaguete
EVRAA	Region VIII or Eastern Visayas	Colegio de Sta. Catalina de Alejandria, Bishop Epifanio Surban St., Dumaguete
ZPRAA	Region IX or Zamboanga Peninsula	Valencia CS / San Pedro Academy, Poblacion, Valencia, Negros Oriental
NMRAA	Region X or Northern Mindanao	Bacong CS / ATI, Poblacion, Bacong, Negros Oriental
DAVRAA	Region XI or Davao Region	Valencia NHS / Bong-ao ESBrgy., Bong-ao, Valencia, Negros Oriental
CRAA	Region XII or Soccsksargen	San Jose CS/HS, Poblacion, San Jose, Negros Oriental
Caraga	Region XIII or Caraga	North City ES / Piapi NHS, E.J. Blanco St., Brgy. Piapi, Dumaguete

Host Region

== Medal tally ==
The following list is the final medal tally as of April 27, 2013.

* Host nation (Central Visayas (Region VII))

Rank	Region	Gold	Silver	Bronze	Total
1	National Capital Region (NCR)	114	111	54	279
2	Western Visayas (Region VI)	78	38	53	169
3	Northern Mindanao (Region X)	38	30	46	114
4	Central Visayas (Region VII)*	29	46	39	114
5	Mimaropa (Region IV-B)	28	14	26	68
6	Calabarzon / STCAA (Region IV-A)	27	26	67	120
7	Central Luzon (Region III)	23	31	35	89
8	Cordillera Administrative Region (CAR)	16	8	19	43
9	Ilocos Region (Region I)	13	12	37	62
10	Davao Region (Region XI)	12	11	20	43
11	Soccsksargen / CRAA (Region XII)	7	15	30	52
12	Cagayan Valley (Region II)	6	6	10	22
13	Zamboanga Peninsula (Region IX)	4	1	10	15
14	Caraga (Region XIII)	3	9	12	24
15	Bicol Region (Region V)	1	17	21	39
16	Autonomous Region in Muslim Mindanao (ARMM)	0	14	2	16
17	Eastern Visayas (Region VIII)	0	6	8	14
Totals (17 entries)		399	395	489	1,283

Host Region

== Point system by DepEd ==
Rank	Region	Elementary (Pts)	Secondary (Pts)	Total Points
1	National Capital Region (NCRAA)	227.5	369	596.5
2	Region VI - WVRAA	189.67	256.67	446.34
3	Region VII - CVRAA	151	182	333
4	Region X - NMRAA	182	106	288
5	Region 4A - STCAA / Calabarzon	57	193	250
6	Region III - CLRAA	100	55	155
7	Region XII - CRAA / SOCCKSARGEN	73	56.5	129.5
8	Region I - IRAA	76.67	34	110.67
9	Region 4B - Mimaropa	57.17	50.5	107.67
10	Region CAR - CARRAA	48.67	55.5	104.17
11	Region XI - DAVRAA	43	41.5	84.5
12	Region V - BRAA	35.17	33.17	68.34
13	Caraga - CARAGAA	32	19	51
14	Region IX - ZPRAA	19.17	10	29.17
15	ARMM - ARMRAA	27	0	27
16	Region II - CAVRAA	11	12.5	23.5
17	Region VIII - EVRAA	3	7.67	10.67

== Criticisms and concerns ==
Before the 2013 Palarong Pambansa began, an estimate of 170 student athletes was reported to be affected by diarrhea. In fact, the majority of the victims were high school students from Region 8. Headaches and vomiting were observed and some affected athletes and officials were immediately brought to a nearby hospital in Dumaguete city. Apparently, food poisoning and drinking unclean water were the possible causes of the incident. In response, an investigation has been done and results were likely to come out. Food preparation is not the responsibility of the host province but of the visiting regions themselves.

Moreover, Athletics became intense when Region 12 (or CRAA/SOCCKSARGEN) made a protest in the "Secondary Boys - 100m" running event. A photo finish was requested to determine the winner of the race more accurately, but there was only one recorded video available for the edition that was not able to capture the finish of the said race. Thus, Christopher Lirazan of Region 6 (or Western Visayas) and Romnick Nor of Region 12/CRAA were in dispute for the gold medal.

At the end of the competition, the only region that failed to maintain its perennial top three finish at the medal tally and the DepEd point system was Region 4A (or STCAA - Calabarzon). On the other hand, regional powerhouse NCR (or NCRAA) and Region 6 (or WVRAA) were able to keep their positions as the number one and two teams of 2013 respectively. The host (Region VII - CVRAA) claimed the third spot in the point system, while Region 10 (or NMRAA) was third place in the medal tally.
