= Marcos Stadium =

Football and track stadium in the Philippines

- FEM Stadium; Stadium of the North
- The stadium in November 2022
- Interactive map of Marcos Stadium
- Full name: Ferdinand E. Marcos Memorial Stadium
- Location: Nuestra Senora del Rosario St., Brgy. 3, Laoag, Ilocos Norte, Philippines
- Coordinates: 18°12′29.4″N 120°35′33.4″E
- Owner: Ilocos Norte Provincial Government
- Operator: Ilocos Norte Provincial Government
- Capacity: 12,000
- Surface: Grass

Construction
- Groundbreaking: 2019
- Cost: ₱1 Billion
- Architects: WTA Architecture and Design Studio

The Ferdinand E. Marcos Memorial Stadium, also known as Marcos Stadium, is a football and track stadium and park for sports and leisure in Laoag, Ilocos Norte.

== History ==
=== Old stadium ===
The site of the present Marcos Stadium was occupied by Mariano Marcos Stadium, an older stadium. The older Marcos Stadium had a seating capacity of 2,000. The stadium's last major renovation was from 2008 to 2009 when its athletic oval was rubberized.

It was significantly damaged by Typhoon Mangkhut (Ompong) in 2018. Its roof was blown off and its windows shattered. The old stadium was demolished to make way for the construction of a newer stadium.

=== Current stadium ===
The new Marcos Stadium was part of the "Big 3" project under Ilocos Norte Governor Imee Marcos, along with Dap-ayan Food Park, and Provincial Capitol expansion. The project was funded by the Development Bank of the Philippines.

The groundbreaking was on June 28, 2019. The stadium was inherited by the next provincial governor Matthew Manotoc who is also Imee Marcos' son. The project's target completion was extended by a year due to the COVID-19 pandemic. By April 2022, the stadium is 57 percent complete.

The stadium was inaugurated on February 24, 2023, for the Tan-ok Festival.

== Architecture and design ==
Pitch and grandstand

The Marcos Stadium was designed by WTA Architecture and Design Studio. It was named ArchDaily 2025 Building of the Year for the sports architecture category.

The stadium has a seating capacity of 12,000. It has an area of 61,668.48 m^{2} (663,794.0 sq ft). The facade follows the motif of an abel, an Ilocano textile with a binakol or whirlwind pattern design.The grandstand structure does not completely envelope the pitch with its southern end being an open space called the Stadium Park. The slopping lawn in this area leads to Laoag's Rizal Park.

The manufacturers include APO, Acersteel, Angeles wood works, Arm Strong, Atlanta Duraroof, Boysen, Cemex, City Shutter, Davies, El Concar Glass & Aluminum, Gyproc, Jardine enterprises, Landlite, MB tech, Mariwasa, Northern Cement, Regan Industrial, Remmington Industrial, Shera and Smartboard. The architectural engineering is by Omicron Tekton construction Joint Venture and TCGI Engineers.

== See also ==
- Laoag, Ilocos Norte
- List of football stadiums in the Philippines
