= Philippine Schools Overseas =

Class of Philippine international schools

- Type: International schools
- Region served: Asia (except Philippines) and Europe
- Members: 31 schools
- Affiliations: Department of Education of the Philippines (accrediting body)
- Students: 25,000 (2022)
- Website: pso.cfo.gov.ph

Philippine Schools Overseas (PSO) are a class of international schools which are accredited by the Department of Education of the Philippines and regulations of their host countries.

The Inter-Agency Committee on the Philippine Schools Overseas (IAC-PSO) facilitates the regulations to be followed by PSOs. IAC-PSO was established in February 1995 and institutionalized on May 5, 2000 via Executive Order No. 252 issued by President Joseph Estrada

PSOs under the Association of Philippine Schools Overseas (APSO) has participated in the Palarong Pambansa debuting in 2024.

== List ==
As of September 5, 2024.

Name	City	Country	Status
Philippine International School Phnom Penh	Phnom Penh	Cambodia	Provisional
Philippine School Bahrain	A'ali	Bahrain	Recognized
Philippine School in Greece	Athens	Greece	Recognized
Philippine International English School	Fahaheel	Kuwait	Recognized
The New Kuwait Philippines International School	Jleeb Al-Shuyoukh	Kuwait	Recognized
Philippine Centennial Academy, International	Benghazi	Libya	Provisional
Philippine Cooperative Academy in Libya	Tripoli	Libya	Provisional
International Philippine School in Italy	Rome	Italy	Provisional
International Migrants School	Rome	Italy	SHS permit only
Philippine School Doha	Doha	Qatar	Recognized
Philippine International School–Qatar	Doha	Qatar	Recognized
Philippine School Oman	Muscat	Oman	Recognized
International Philippine School in Jeddah	Jeddah	Saudi Arabia	Provisional
Al Madj International School Dammam	Khobar	Saudi Arabia	Provisional
International Philippine School in Al Khobar	Khobar	Saudi Arabia	Recognized
Al Taj International School	Riyadh	Saudi Arabia	Recognized
Al Danah International School	Riyadh	Saudi Arabia	SHS permit only
Elite International School	Riyadh	Saudi Arabia	Recognized
Future Generation Philippine International School	Riyadh	Saudi Arabia	Recognized
International Philippine School in Riyadh	Riyadh	Saudi Arabia	SHS permit only
Palm Crest International School	Riyadh	Saudi Arabia	Recognized
Second Philippine International School	Riyadh	Saudi Arabia	Provisional
Maharlika International School	Dili	Timor-Leste	Provisional
Philippine–Emirates Private School	Abu Dhabi	United Arab Emirates	Provisional
The Philippine Global School–Abu Dhabi	Abu Dhabi	United Arab Emirates	Recognized
The Philippine School–Abu Dhabi	Abu Dhabi	United Arab Emirates	Provisional
Universal Philippine School	Abu Dhabi	United Arab Emirates	Provisional
The Philippine School, Dubai	Dubai	United Arab Emirates	Recognized
United International Private School	Dubai	United Arab Emirates	Recognized
The New Filipino Private School	Sharjah	United Arab Emirates	Provisional
Far Eastern Private School–Halwan Campus	Sharjah	United Arab Emirates	Provisional
Far Eastern Private School-Al Shahba Campus	Sharjah	United Arab Emirates	Recognized
