= List of football stadiums in the Philippines =

The following is a list of football stadiums in the Philippines, ordered by capacity. Note that this list includes stadiums that form part of a larger sports complex which don't have a name on their own as well as stadiums named "sports complex" despite not having any auxiliary sports facilities such as a secondary stadium or an indoor arena.

== Primary stadiums ==
Image	Stadium	Capacity	City	Island group	Home team(s)	Ref.
	New Clark City Stadium	20,000	New Clark City	Luzon	Philippine men's national football team; United City F.C.	
	Philippine Sports Stadium	20,000	Ciudad de Victoria	Luzon	Philippine men's national football team	
	PhilSports Football and Athletics Stadium	15,000	Pasig	Luzon		
	Rizal Memorial Stadium	12,873	Manila	Luzon	Philippine men's national football team; Philippines women's national football team	
	Marcos Stadium	12,000	Laoag	Luzon		
	Sorsogon Sports Arena	12,000	Sorsogon City	Luzon		
	Panaad Stadium	10,500	Bacolod	Visayas	Philippine men's national football team	
	University of San Carlos Stadium	8,000	Cebu City	Visayas		
	Quirino Stadium	5,000	Bantay	Luzon		
	City of Imus Grandstand and Track Oval	4,800	Imus	Luzon	Mendiola F.C.	
	University of Makati Stadium	3,800	Makati	Luzon	Aguilas F.C.	
	Sarimanok Sports Stadium	3,700	Marawi	Mindanao		
	Biñan Football Stadium	3,000	Biñan	Luzon	Stallion Laguna F.C.	
	McKinley Hill Stadium	2,000	Taguig	Luzon	Maharlika F.C.	
	Adidas Football Park	2,000	Pasay	Luzon	Philippines women's national football team	

== Regional sports complexes and grounds ==
Stadium	City	Island group	Home team(s)
Governor Mariano Perdices Memorial Coliseum	Dumaguete	Visayas	
Pelaéz Sports Complex	Cagayan de Oro	Mindanao	
Narciso Ramos Sports and Civic Center stadium	Lingayen	Luzon	
Isabela Sports Complex stadium	Ilagan	Luzon	
Marikina Sports Center main stadium	Marikina	Luzon	
Bukidnon Stadium at Bukidnon Sports and Cultural Complex	Malaybalay	Mindanao	
Mindanao Civic Center Stadium	Tubod	Mindanao	
Joaquin F. Enriquez Memorial Sports Complex stadium	Zamboanga City	Mindanao	
Binaybayon Sports Complex stadium	Baybay	Visayas	
Cebu City Sports Center	Cebu City	Visayas	Philippine men's national football team
Batangas City Stadium	Batangas City	Luzon	
Iloilo Sports Complex stadium	Iloilo City	Visayas	Kaya F.C.–Iloilo
Alcala Sports Complex stadium	Lucena	Luzon	
Villareal Stadium	Roxas	Visayas	
Cagayan Sports Complex stadium	Tuguegarao	Luzon	
Tangub City Sports Complex stadium	Tangub	Mindanao	
Acharon Sports Centre stadium	General Santos	Mindanao	
Cauayan City Sports Complex stadium	Cauayan	Luzon	
Jose Rizal Memorial State University stadium	Dapitan	Mindanao	
Patin-ay Sports Complex stadium	Prosperidad	Mindanao	
Negros Oriental State University stadium	Bayawan	Visayas	
Misamis Occidental Provincial Athletic Complex	Oroquieta	Mindanao	
Leyte Sports Development Center	Tacloban	Visayas	
Binirayan Sports Complex stadium	San Jose de Buenavista	Visayas	
Laguna Sports Complex stadium	Santa Cruz	Luzon	
Metro Naga Sports Complex stadium	Naga City	Luzon	
Bulacan Sports Complex stadium	Malolos	Luzon	
Surigao Provincial Sports Complex stadium	Surigao City	Mindanao	
Carlos P. Garcia Sports Complex stadium	Tagbilaran	Visayas	
Bicol University stadium	Legazpi	Luzon	
South Cotabato Sports Complex stadium	Koronadal	Mindanao	
Julian Soriano Memorial Sports Complex stadium	Siocon	Mindanao	
Davao del Norte Sports Complex stadium	Tagum	Mindanao	
Baguio Athletic Bowl	Baguio	Luzon	
Daet Eco Athletic Field	Daet	Luzon	
Montano Hall Oval Grounds	Cavite City	Luzon	
Surigao del Sur Sports Center stadium	Tandag	Mindanao	
Ramon V. Mitra Jr. Sports Complex	Puerto Princesa	Luzon	
Sulu Provincial Sports Complex	Jolo	Mindanao	
Mindanao State University grand stand	Marawi	Mindanao	
Congressman Pedro Palarca-Romualdo Tourism and Sports Complex	Mambajao	Mindanao	
Quirino Sports Complex	Cabarroguis	Luzon	
Nueva Ecija Sports Complex	Palayan	Luzon	
Ilagan Sports Complex	Ilagan	Luzon	
Jose V. Yap Recreational Sports Center	San Jose, Tarlac	Luzon	
Occidental Mindoro Sports Complex	San Jose, Occidental Mindoro	Luzon	
Ormoc City Sports Complex	Ormoc	Visayas	
Freedom Sports Complex	Pili	Luzon	
Aklan Sports Complex	Makato	Visayas	
Batangas Provincial Sports Complex	Batangas City	Luzon	
Zamboanga del Sur Sports Academy	Pagadian	Mindanao	
Cotabato Provincial Sports Complex	Kidapawan	Mindanao	
Abra Sports Complex	Bangued	Luzon	
University of Mindanao stadium	Davao City	Mindanao	
Mati Centennial Sports Complex	Mati	Mindanao	
Baler Sports Complex	Baler	Luzon	
Maragusan Sports Complex	Maragusan	Mindanao	
UP Diliman Football Stadium	Quezon City	Luzon	
Manuel Y. Torres Sports Center	Bago	Visayas	
Tarlac Agricultural University football field	Camiling	Luzon	
Siargao Sports Complex	Dapa	Mindanao	
Dasmariñas Football Field	Dasmariñas	Luzon	
General Trias Sports Park Trias Oval	General Trias	Luzon	
Teodoro "Doring" Mendiola Sr. Sports Field and Track Oval	Naga	Visayas	
Ricardo P. Palmares Sr. Memorial Sports Complex	Passi	Visayas	

== Stadiums under construction ==
Stadium	Capacity	City	Island Group	Home team	Ref.
Davao City–UP Sports Complex Main Stadium	30,000	Davao City	Mindanao		
Tolosa Sports Center	25,000	Tolosa	Visayas		
Zambales Sports Stadium	20,000	Iba	Luzon		
City San Fernando Track Oval	20,000	San Fernando	Luzon		
Tagum City Stadium	20,000	Tagum	Mindanao		
Amoranto Stadium	15,000	Quezon City	Luzon		
Davao Oriental Sports Complex Stadium	10,000	Mati	Mindanao		
Spark Samar Sports City Stadium	8,100	Catbalogan	Visayas		
Butuan Polysports Football Stadium	3,672	Butuan	Mindanao	Butuan-Agusan del Norte F.C.	
Tanauan City Sports Complex	3,500	Tanauan	Luzon		
Taytay Sports Complex	3,000	Taytay	Luzon		
Villar City Stadium	3,000	Dasmariñas	Luzon		
New Guihulngan Government Complex Main Stadium	3,000	Guihulngan	Visayas		
Cabadbaran City Sports Complex	2,000	Cabadbaran	Mindanao		
Maasin City Sports Complex	2,000	Maasin	Visayas		
Douglas R.A. Cagas Sports Complex	2,000	Digos	Mindanao		

== See also ==
- List of indoor arenas in the Philippines
- List of baseball stadiums in the Philippines
- List of long course swimming pools in the Philippines
- List of stadiums in Asia
- List of association football stadiums by capacity
- List of association football stadiums by country
- List of sports venues by capacity
- List of stadiums by capacity
- Lists of stadiums
- Football in the Philippines
