= List of indoor arenas in the Philippines =

This is a list of indoor arenas in the Philippines with a capacity of at least 2,000. Most of the arenas in this list have hosted professional sports leagues (e.g. PBA and PVL), collegiate sports leagues (e.g. UAAP and NCAA Philippines), as well as various cultural and political events. The Philippines is also where the world's largest indoor arena, the Philippine Arena in Bocaue, Bulacan, is located with a capacity of 55,000.

== Arenas in Metro Manila ==
Arena	City	Capacity	Year opened	Major tenants	Image
SM Mall of Asia Arena	Pasay	15,000	2012	Philippine Basketball Association; Premier Volleyball League; University Athletic Association of the Philippines; National Collegiate Athletic Association	
Araneta Coliseum	Quezon City	14,429	1960	Philippine Basketball Association; Premier Volleyball League; University Athletic Association of the Philippines; National Collegiate Athletic Association	
Cuneta Astrodome	Pasay	12,000	1993	Pasay Voyagers (MPBL)	
PhilSports Arena	Pasig	10,000	1985	Philippine Basketball Association; Premier Volleyball League; University Athletic Association of the Philippines; National Collegiate Athletic Association	
Marikina Sports Center	Marikina	7,000	1969	Marikina Shoemasters (MPBL)	
Rizal Memorial Coliseum	Manila	6,100	1934	Philippine Basketball Association; Manila Batang Quiapo (MPBL)	
Ninoy Aquino Stadium	Manila	6,000		Philippine Basketball Association; Premier Volleyball League	
Playtime Filoil Centre	San Juan	6,000	2006	Philippine Basketball Association; Premier Volleyball League; University Athletic Association of the Philippines; National Collegiate Athletic Association; San Juan Knights (MPBL)	
San Andres Sports Complex	Manila	5,000		Manila Batang Quiapo (MPBL)	
Villar Coliseum	Las Piñas	4,000	2023	Parañaque Patriots (MPBL)	
Amoranto Arena	Quezon City	3,500	2023	Quezon City Galeries Taipan (MPBL)	
Makati Coliseum	Makati	3,500	1998		
Parañaque Coliseum	Parañaque	3,500	2026	Women's Maharlika Pilipinas Basketball League	
Caloocan Sports Complex	Caloocan	3,000	2017	Philippine Basketball Association; Caloocan Batang Kankaloo (MPBL)	
Muntinlupa Sports Center	Muntinlupa	3,000			
Valenzuela City Astrodome	Valenzuela	3,000	2012	Valenzuela City Darkhorse (MPBL)	
Ynares Sports Arena	Pasig	3,000	2008	Philippine Basketball Association; Pasig City (MPBL)	
Navotas Convention Center	Navotas	2,633	2025	Navotas Clutch (MPBL)	
Pasig Sports Center	Pasig	2,500	2015		
Jun Dueñas Gym	Taguig	2,000		Taguig Generals (NBL)	
Hagonoy Sports Complex	Taguig	2,000			
Novadeci Convention Center	Quezon City	2,000	2022	Quezon City Black Bulls (MPBL)	
Quezon City District 2 Gymnasium	Quezon City	2,000	2025	Quezon City Black Bulls (MPBL)	
San Juan Gym	San Juan	2,000			
WES Arena	Valenzuela	2,000	2021	Valenzuela City Darkhorse (MPBL)	

== Arenas in Luzon ==
Arena	Location		Capacity	Year opened	Major tenants	Image
Arena	City or municipality	Province	Capacity	Year opened	Major tenants	Image
Philippine Arena	Bocaue	Bulacan	55,000	2014	Philippine Basketball Association	
Jesse M. Robredo Coliseum	Naga	Camarines Sur	12,000	2010		
Ynares Center	Antipolo	Rizal	12,000	1990s	Philippine Basketball Association; Premier Volleyball League; Rizal Golden Coolers (MPBL)	
AATF Sports Complex	Imus	Cavite	14,440	2010		
Capital Arena	Ilagan	Isabela	10,000	2024	Premier Volleyball League; Ilagan Isabela Cowboys (MPBL)	
Chavit Coliseum	Vigan	Ilocos Sur	9,000	2025	Philippine Basketball Association; Premier Volleyball League	
Jose Rizal Coliseum	Calamba	Laguna	8,100	2023		
Santiago City Sports Arena	Santiago	Isabela	8,000	2025		
Candon City Arena	Candon	Ilocos Sur	8,000	2023	Philippine Basketball Association; Premier Volleyball League	
Ibalong Centrum for Recreation	Legazpi	Albay	8,000	2010	Philippine Basketball Association	
Puerto Princesa City Coliseum	Puerto Princesa	Palawan	8,000	2003		
Ynares Center II	Rodriguez	Rizal	8,000	2025	Philippine Basketball Association; Premier Volleyball League; Rizal Golden Coolers (MPBL)	
Benguet Sports Complex Gymnasium	La Trinidad	Benguet	7,000	2021		
Quezon Convention Center	Lucena	Quezon	7,000	2001	Quezon Huskers (MPBL)	
Alonte Sports Arena	Biñan	Laguna	6,500	2013	Biñan Tatak Gel (MPBL)	
Narciso Ramos Sports and Civic Center	Lingayen	Pangasinan	6,100	1995		
Batangas Province Events Center	Batangas City	Batangas	6,000	2025	Batangas City Tanduay Rum Masters (MPBL)	
Ilocos Norte Centennial Arena	Laoag	Ilocos Norte	6,000			
Santa Rosa Sports Complex	Santa Rosa	Laguna	5,700	2017	Philippine Basketball Association; Premier Volleyball League	
Nueva Ecija Coliseum	Palayan	Nueva Ecija	5,500	2020	Nueva Ecija Rice Vanguards (MPBL); Nueva Ecija Granary Buffalos (NBL)	
Albay Astrodome	Legazpi	Albay	5,000			
Baliuag Star Arena	Baliuag	Bulacan	5,000		Bulacan Kuyas (MPBL)	
Cagayan Sports Coliseum	Tuguegarao	Cagayan	5,000	2015		
Angeles City Sports Complex	Angeles City	Pampanga	5,000	2025		
Malolos Sports and Convention Center	Malolos	Bulacan	5,000	2010	Bulacan Kuyas (MPBL)	
San Jose Del Monte Sports Complex	San Jose del Monte	Bulacan	5,000	2019	Meycauayan Marilao Gems (MPBL)	
San Leonardo Sports Gym	San Leonardo	Nueva Ecija	5,000			
Tarlac City Gymnatorium	Tarlac City	Tarlac	5,000	2023		
Urdaneta Sports Center	Urdaneta	Pangasinan	5,000			
Bataan People's Center	Balanga	Bataan	4,000		Bataan Risers (MPBL)	
Batangas City Coliseum	Batangas City	Batangas	4,000		Philippine Basketball Association; Batangas City Tanduay Rum Masters (MPBL)	
Calasiao Sports Complex	Calasiao	Pangasinan	4,000		Pangasinan Heatwaves (MPBL)	
Lucena City Convention Center	Lucena	Quezon	4,000	2024	Quezon Huskers (MPBL); Quezon Starhorse (NBL)	
Robert B. Estrella Sr. Memorial Stadium	Rosales	Pangasinan	4,000	2010	Pangasinan Heatwaves (MPBL); Pangasinan Asinderos (NBL)	
Calapan City Coliseum	Calapan	Mindoro	3,500	2026	Mindoro Tamaraws (MPBL)	
Bren Z. Guiao Convention Center	San Fernando	Pampanga	3,000		Philippine Basketball Association; Pampanga Giant Lanterns (MPBL)	
FPJ Arena	San Jose	Batangas	3,000	2023	Philippine Basketball Association; Batangas City Tanduay Rum Masters (MPBL)	
Fuerte CamSur Sports Complex	Pili	Camarines Sur	3,000	2022	CamSur Express (NBL)	
Isabela Convention Center	Cauayan	Isabela	3,000	2021		
Josefina T. Albano Sports Center	Cabagan	Isabela	3,000			
One Arena	Cainta	Rizal	3,000			
Santo Domingo Coliseum	Santo Domingo	Ilocos Sur	3,000			
Southern Quezon Convention Center	Gumaca	Quezon	3,000			
Tiaong Convention Center	Tiaong	Quezon	3,000	2023	Philippine Basketball Association	
San Luis Sports Complex	Santa Cruz	Laguna	2,500			
Bacoor City Strike Gymnasium	Bacoor	Cavite	2,000	2015	Bacoor City Strikers (MPBL)	
Jose Songco Lapid Cultural Sports and Civic Center	Porac	Pampanga	2,000			
Malvar Sports Arena	Malvar	Batangas	2,000	2023	Batangas Barako - Venom Art (NBL)	
Orion Sports Complex	Orion	Bataan	2,000		Bataan Risers (MPBL)	
Pacoy Ortega Gym	San Fernando	La Union	2,000			
Padre Garcia Cultural and Sports Center	Padre Garcia	Batangas	2,000	2024		
Rosario Cultural and Sports Center	Rosario	Batangas	2,000	2022		
Roy Padilla Sr. Memorial Stadium	Jose Panganiban	Camarines Norte	2,000			
Subic Bay Gymnasium	Subic	Zambales	2,000		Maharlika Pilipinas Basketball League	

== Arenas in Visayas ==
Arena	Location		Capacity	Year opened	Major tenants	Image
Arena	City or municipality	Province	Capacity	Year opened	Major tenants	Image
SM Seaside Cebu Arena	Cebu City	Cebu	16,000	2026	Abra Weavers (EASL); Premier Volleyball League	
Ormoc City Superdome	Ormoc	Leyte	10,000	1995		
Victorias City Coliseum	Victorias	Negros Occidental	8,000	2007		
Tamasak Arena	Barotac Nuevo	Iloilo	7,000	2022		
Capiz Gymnasium	Roxas	Capiz	6,000			
Hoops Dome	Lapu-Lapu	Cebu	6,000	2008	Cebu Greats (MPBL)	
Cong. Lamberto L. Macias Sports and Cultural Center	Dumaguete	Negros Oriental	6,000			
Cebu Coliseum	Cebu City	Cebu	5,000	1962	Cebu Schools Athletic Foundation, Inc. Cebu Greats (MPBL)	
Tacloban City Convention Center	Tacloban	Leyte	5,000	2006		
Toledo City Megadome	Toledo	Cebu	5,000	2020		
Bago Coliseum	Bago	Negros Occidental	4,000	1995		
Bayawan City - Norsu Arena	Bayawan	Negros Oriental	4,000			
Mandaue City Sports and Cultural Complex	Mandaue	Cebu	4,000			
Minglanilla Sports Complex	Minglanilla	Cebu	4,000		Premier Volleyball League	
ABL Sports & Cultural Complex	Kalibo	Aklan	3,000	1994		
Enan Chiong Activity Center	Naga	Cebu	3,000	2010		
Iloilo Sports Complex	Iloilo City	Iloilo	3,000			
Maasin City Sports Complex	Maasin	Southern Leyte	3,000			
Bacolod Arts & Youth Sports Center	Bacolod	Negros Occidental	2,000			
Calbayog City Sports Center	Calbayog	Samar	2,000	2018		
Cebu City Sports Institute	Cebu City	Cebu	2,000			
Danao Civic Center	Danao	Cebu	2,000	2003		
Dinggoy Roxas Civic Center	Roxas	Capiz	2,000			
Negros Occidental Multi-Purpose Activity Center	Bacolod	Negros Occidental	2,000	2000s		
Passi City Arena	Passi	Iloilo	2,000	2018	Philippine Basketball Association; Premier Volleyball League; The Asian Tournament	
Pres. Diosdado Macapagal Sports and Cultural Center	Argao	Cebu	2,000	2008		

== Arenas in Mindanao ==
Arena	Location		Capacity	Year opened	Major tenants	Image
Arena	City or municipality	Province	Capacity	Year opened	Major tenants	Image
KJC King Dome	Davao City	Davao del Sur	75,000	2026	KOJC	
Mayor Vitaliano D. Agan Coliseum	Zamboanga City	Zamboanga del Sur	10,000	2002	Philippine Basketball Association; Zamboanga Sikat (MPBL); Zamboanga Valientes	
Sultan Kudarat Sports Complex and Cultural Center	Isulan	Sultan Kudarat	10,000	2010		
South Cotabato Gymnasium and Cultural Center	Koronadal	South Cotabato	8,000	Around 1996		
Claver Sports Arena	Claver	Surigao del Norte	8,000			
Aquilino Q. Pimentel Jr. International Convention Center	Cagayan de Oro	Misamis Oriental	7,700	2022	Philippine Basketball Association	
Davao del Sur Coliseum	Digos	Davao del Sur	7,000	2010		
Dipolog City Sports Center	Dipolog	Zamboanga del Norte	7,000	2010		
Lagao Gymnasium	General Santos	South Cotabato	7,000		GenSan Warriors (MPBL)	
Quezon Civic Arena	Quezon	Bukidnon	7,000	2024		
Panabo City Tourism, Cultural and Sports Center	Panabo	Davao del Norte	6,000	2007	Philippine Basketball Association	
Polomolok Gymnasium	Polomolok	South Cotabato	6,000	2015		
Mindanao Civic Center Gymnasium	Tubod	Lanao del Norte	4,368	2001		
New Camiguin Gymnasium	Mambajao	Camiguin	4,000	2024		
Oroquieta City Bayfront Arena	Oroquieta	Misamis Occidental	4,000	2024		
Vicente T. Pimentel Jr. Memorial Gymnasium	Tandag	Surigao del Sur	4,000			
Surigao Provincial Sports Complex Gymnasium	Surigao City	Surigao del Norte	3,500	2009		
Bukidnon Sports and Cultural Complex Gymnasium	Malaybalay	Bukidnon	3,000	2023		
DOSCST Gym	Mati	Davao Oriental	3,000			
Kim Lope A. Asis Memorial Gymnasium	Bayugan	Agusan del Sur	3,000	2009		
Lamitan City New Gymnasium	Lamitan	Basilan	3,000	2017	Basilan Viva Portmasters (MPBL)	
Siargao Multi-purpose Gymnasium	Dapa	Surigao del Norte	3,000	2020		
Sindangan Municipal Gymnasium	Sindangan	Zamboanga del Norte	3,000			
Don Ruben Gymnasium	San Jose	Dinagat Islands	3,000			
Datu Saudi Uy Ampatuan Sports and Cultural Center	Shariff Aguak	Maguindanao	2,500	2009		
Valencia City Gymnasium and Cultural Center	Valencia	Bukidnon	2,500	2018		
Dapa Municipal Gymnasium	Dapa	Surigao del Norte	2,000	2014		
Davao City Recreation Center	Davao City	Davao del Sur	2,000		Davao Occidental Tigers (MPBL)	
Democrito O. Plaza Sports Complex Gymnasium	Prosperidad	Agusan del Sur	2,000	2023		
Governor Democrito O. Plaza Gymnasium	Santa Josefa	Agusan del Sur	2,000			
La Paz Municipal Gymnasium	La Paz	Agusan del Sur	2,000	2017		
Las Nieves Municipal Gymnasium	Las Nieves	Agusan del Norte	2,000			
Loreto Municipal Dome	Loreto	Agusan del Sur	2,000	2022		
Mangagoy Barangay Hall and Gymnasium	Bislig	Surigao del Sur	2,000	2012		
Remedios T. Romualdez Municipal Gymnasium	Remedios T. Romualdez	Agusan del Norte	2,000	2022		
Eutiquio O. Bade Sr. Sports and Cultural Center	Rosario	Agusan del Sur	2,000	2018		
Sibagat Center for Culture and Arts cum Evacuation Center	Sibagat	Agusan del Sur	2,000	2017		
Talacogon Municipal Gymnasium	Talacogon	Agusan del Sur	2,000	2018		
J.P. Satorre Gymnasium	Buenavista	Agusan del Norte	2,000	2025		
Del Monte Barangay Evacuation Center	Talacogon	Agusan del Sur	2,000	2026		
EOC Evacuation Center	Prosperidad	Agusan del Sur	2,000	2026		

== On-campus arenas ==
Arena	School	Location			Capacity	Year opened	Major tenants	Image
Arena	School	City or municipality	Province	Island group	Capacity	Year opened	Major tenants	Image
Universidad de Zamboanga Summit Centre	Universidad de Zamboanga	Zamboanga City	Zamboanga del Sur	Mindanao	10,000	1998	UZ Wild Cats	
La Salle Coliseum	University of St. La Salle	Bacolod	Negros Occidental	Visayas	8,000	1995	Bacolod Tubo Slashers (MPBL)	
Blue Eagle Gym	Ateneo de Manila University	Quezon City	Metro Manila	Luzon	7,500	1949	Ateneo Blue Eagles (UAAP)	
Quadricentennial Pavilion	University of Santo Tomas	Manila	Metro Manila	Luzon	5,792	2009	University Athletic Association of the Philippines; UST Growling Tigers (UAAP); Philippine Basketball Association	
CEU Malolos Centrodome	Centro Escolar University – Malolos	Malolos	Bulacan	Luzon	5,000			
MSU-IIT Gym	Mindanao State University – Iligan Institute of Technology	Iligan	Iligan	Mindanao	5,000	1968		
USA Gym	University of San Agustin	Iloilo City	Iloilo	Visayas	5,000		Philippine Basketball Association	
USEP Gymnasium and Cultural Center	University of Southeastern Philippines	Davao City	Davao del Sur	Mindanao	5,000	2012		
Dasmariñas Arena	Kolehiyo ng Lungsod ng Dasmariñas	Dasmariñas	Cavite	Luzon	5,000	2022	Philippine Basketball Association	
Colegio San Agustin - Makati Cassisiacum Sports Complex	Colegio San Agustin – Makati	Makati	Metro Manila	Luzon	4,500			
Xavier Ateneo Sports Centre	Xavier University - Ateneo de Cagayan	Cagayan de Oro	Misamis Oriental	Mindanao	4,500	2017		
Urios Gym	Father Saturnino Urios University	Butuan	Agusan del Norte	Mindanao	4,115	1997		
Anselmo Bustos Sports Complex	University of San Carlos	Cebu City	Cebu	Visayas	4,000			
Aznar Coliseum	Southwestern University	Cebu City	Cebu	Visayas	4,000			
Batangas State University Gymnasium	Batangas State University	Batangas City	Batangas	Luzon	4,000			
Recoletos Coliseum	University of San Jose–Recoletos	Cebu City	Cebu	Visayas	4,000	1984	Premier Volleyball League	
St. Anthony Dome	St. Anthony College Calapan	Calapan	Oriental Mindoro	Luzon	4,000			
Olivarez College Coliseum	Olivarez College	Parañaque	Metro Manila	Luzon	3,500		Parañaque Patriots (MPBL)	
One SCC Civic Center	Southern City Colleges West Campus	Zamboanga City	Zamboanga del Sur	Mindanao	3,500	2016		
Xavier University Gym	Xavier University – Ateneo de Cagayan	Cagayan de Oro	Misamis Oriental	Mindanao	3,500			
Araullo University Gym	Araullo University	Cabanatuan	Nueva Ecija	Luzon	3,000			
DWCC Gym	Divine Word College of Calapan	Calapan	Oriental Mindoro	Luzon	3,000			
Holy Cross of Davao College Gym	Holy Cross of Davao College	Davao City	Davao del Sur	Mindanao	3,000	2001		
Montano Hall Gymnasium	Cavite National High School	Cavite City	Cavite	Luzon	3,000	1961		
Recoletos 4th Centennial Gymnasium	San Sebastian College–Recoletos de Cavite	Cavite City	Cavite	Luzon	3,000	2004		
University of Baguio Cardinals Gym	University of Baguio	Baguio	Benguet	Luzon	3,000			
USTP Gymnasium	University of Science and Technology of Southern Philippines	Cagayan de Oro	Misamis Oriental	Mindanao	3,000	2013		
UV Gym	University of the Visayas	Cebu City	Cebu	Visayas	3,000			
CKSC Gymnasium	Chiang Kai Shek College	Manila	Metro Manila	Luzon	2,500			
De La Salle Lipa SENTRUM	De La Salle Lipa	Lipa	Batangas	Luzon	2,500	1995		
Dimaporo Gym	Mindanao State University	Marawi	Lanao del Sur	Mindanao	2,500			
Marist School Gym	Marist School	Marikina	Metro Manila	Luzon	2,500			
Rizal Memorial Colleges Gym	Rizal Memorial Colleges	Davao City	Davao del Sur	Mindanao	2,500			
University of Nueva Caceres Sports Palace	University of Nueva Caceres	Naga	Camarines Sur	Luzon	2,500			
USPF Gym	University of Southern Philippines Foundation	Cebu City	Cebu	Visayas	2,500			
AUF Sports and Cultural Center	Angeles University Foundation	Angeles City	Pampanga	Luzon	2,000		Philippine Basketball Association; Pampanga Giant Lanterns (MPBL)	
Central Philippine University Gym	Central Philippine University	Iloilo City	Iloilo	Visayas	2,000	2005		
CIT-U Gym	Cebu Institute of Technology–University	Cebu City	Cebu	Visayas	2,000			
De La Salle University - Dasmariñas Ugnayang La Salle Gym	De La Salle University – Dasmariñas	Dasmariñas	Cavite	Luzon	2,000			
DHVSU Gym	Don Honorio Ventura State University	Bacolor	Pampanga	Luzon	2,000		Philippine Basketball Association	
FSUU Morelos Gym	Father Saturnino Urios University	Butuan	Agusan del Norte	Mindanao	2,000	2008		
JCSGO Seed Dome	JCSGO Christian Academy	Quezon City	Metro Manila	2,000				
Magis Eagles Gym	Sacred Heart School–Ateneo de Cebu	Mandaue	Cebu	Visayas	2,000	2009		
Philippine Science High School Gym	Philippine Science High School Main Campus	Quezon City	Metro Manila	Luzon	2,000			
Rizal Technological University Gym	Rizal Technological University	Mandaluyong	Metro Manila	Luzon	2,000			
Surigao del Sur State University Gym	Surigao del Sur State University	Tandag	Surigao del Sur	Mindanao	2,000			
University of Abra - Gov. Andres B. Bernos Memorial Gymnasium	University of Abra	Bangued	Abra	Luzon	2,000		Abra Solid North Weavers (MPBL)	
University of the Assumption Gym	University of the Assumption	San Fernando	Pampanga	Luzon	2,000			
West Negros University Gymnasium	West Negros University	Bacolod	Negros Occidental	Visayas	2,000			
PSHS-CRC Gymnasium	Philippine Science High School Caraga Region Campus	Butuan	Agusan del Norte	Mindanao	2,000	2020		
Cabadbaran City National High School Gymnasium	Cabadbaran City National High School	Cabadbaran	Agusan del Norte	Mindanao	2,000	2020		

== Under construction and proposed arenas ==
Arena	Location			Capacity	Projected opening	Status
Arena	City or municipality	Province	Island group	Capacity	Projected opening	Status
Clark Arena	Mabalacat	Pampanga	Luzon	25,000–35,000	2028	Planned
Ozamiz City Mega Sports and Convention Center	Ozamiz	Misamis Occidental	Mindanao	18,000	TBA	
Davao Oriental Sports Complex Gymnasium	Mati	Davao Oriental	Mindanao	10,000	TBA	
Pagadian City Coliseum	Pagadian	Zamboanga del Sur	Mindanao	10,000	TBA	Under construction
Pangasinan Convention and Multi-Purpose Center	Bugallon	Pangasinan	Luzon	10,000	TBA	Construction suspended
Southern City Colleges Citadel Sports Arena	Zamboanga City	Zamboanga del Sur	Mindanao	10,000	TBA	
Tagbilaran City Coliseum	Tagbilaran	Bohol	Visayas	10,000		Under construction
Masskara Coliseum	Bacolod	Negros Occidental	Visayas	10,000		Under construction
Home of the UAAP	Pasig	Metro Manila	Luzon	8,074	2027	Under construction
Proposed Philippine Basketball Association arena	Quezon City	Metro Manila	Luzon	8,000–10,000	TBA	Planned
Davao del Norte Coliseum	Tagum	Davao del Norte	Mindanao	8,000	TBA	Proposed
Butuan City Convention Center	Butuan	Agusan del Norte	Mindanao	8,000	TBA	Under construction
Tanauan City Sports Arena	Tanauan	Batangas	Luzon	5,500	TBA	
Isabela City Gymnasium	Isabela	Basilan	Mindanao	5,000	TBA	Under construction
Taytay Sports Complex	Taytay	Rizal	Luzon	3,000	TBA	Under construction
Ibaan Cultural and Sports Center	Ibaan	Batangas	Luzon	2,500		Under construction
Lanao del Sur Provincial Gymnasium	Marawi	Lanao del Sur	Mindanao	2,500		Under construction
Caraga State University Sanchez Gymnasium	Butuan	Agusan del Norte	Mindanao	2,000	TBA	Under renovation
Magallanes Cultural and Sports Centre	Magallanes	Agusan del Norte	Mindanao	2,000	TBA	Under construction
Helios Pickleball Center	Pasig	Metro Manila	Luzon	TBA	TBA	Planned

== See also ==
- List of Philippine Basketball Association arenas
- List of MPBL arenas
- List of Premier Volleyball League arenas
- List of football stadiums in the Philippines
- List of baseball stadiums in the Philippines
- List of long course swimming pools in the Philippines
