= List of long-course swimming pools in the Philippines =

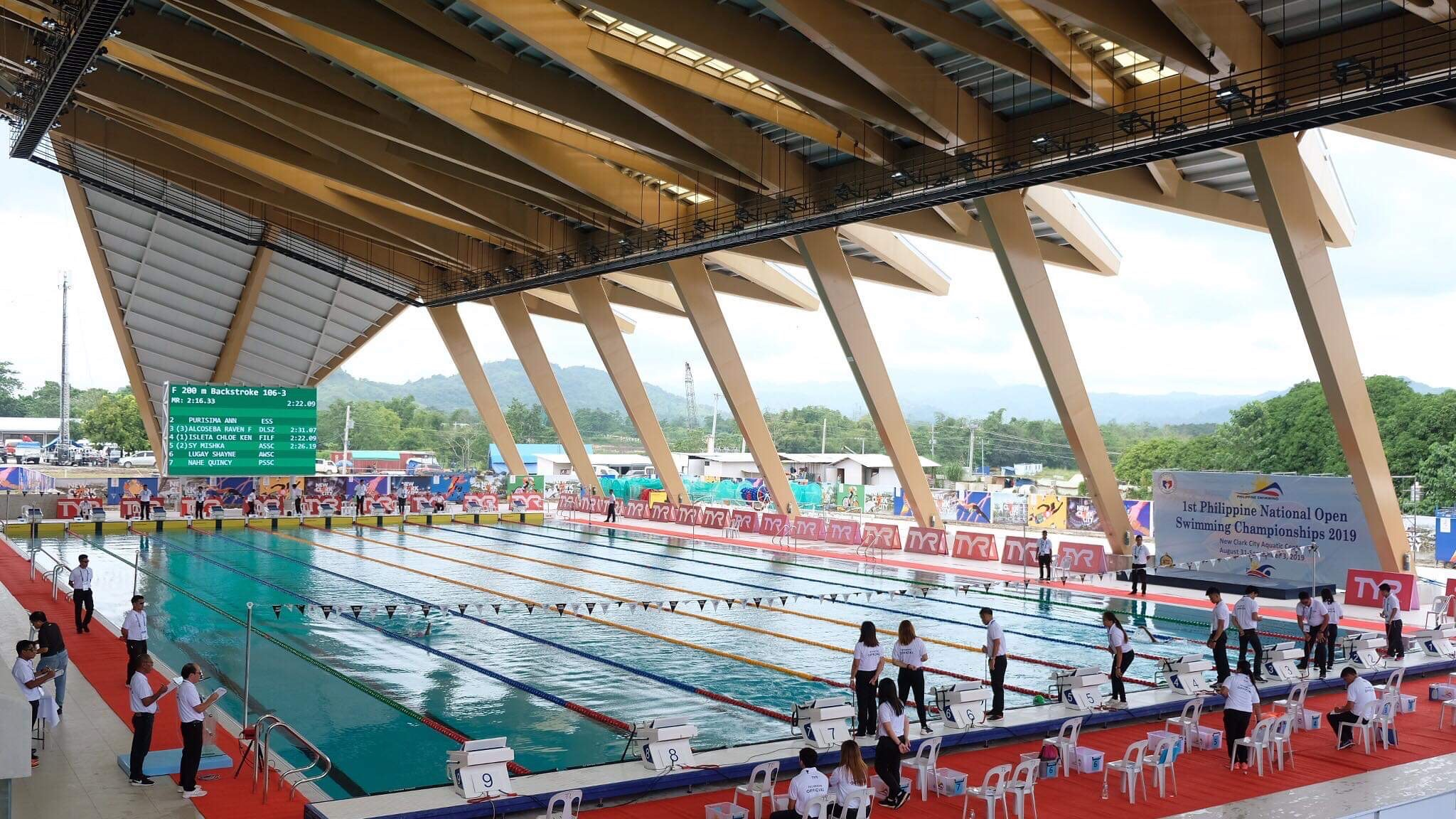
The Aquatics Center at the New Clark City, Capas, Tarlac. The only FINA-certified swimming pool facility in the Philippines.

The following is an annotated list of swimming pools in the Philippines that conform to the Olympic standard. Additionally, it lists other long-course facilities that do not quite come up to the full standard of 50 × 25 metres, 10 (middle 8 used) lanes.

== Olympic size pools ==
Location		Pool/centre name	Pool dimensions		Further information
City	Island Group	Pool/centre name	Length	Width (lanes)	Further information
Capas	Luzon	New Clark City Aquatics Center	50 m	25 m (10)	Opened on August 31, 2019 as part of the New Clark City Sports Hub and one of the venues for the 2019 Southeast Asian Games, and upcoming 2020 Asian Swimming Championships.
Pasig	Luzon	PhilSports Swimming Center	50 m	25 m (10)	Opened in 1985 as part of PhilSports Complex and one of the venues for the 1991 Southeast Asian Games
Iloilo City	Visayas	Central Philippine University Swimming Pool	50 m	25 m (10)	Part of Central Philippine University's sport facilities.
Manila	Luzon	Rizal Memorial Swimming Center	50 m	20 m (10)	Part of the Rizal Memorial Sports Complex. Renovated in 2020 from 8 lanes.
Tagum	Mindanao	DNSTC Aquatic Center	50 m	25 m (10)	Opened 12 December 2012 as part of Davao del Norte Sports Complex and one of the venues for the 2015 Palarong Pambansa
Legazpi	Luzon	Bicol University Swimming Pool	50 m	25 m (10)	Opened in 2016 as part of the Bicol University Sports Complex and one of the venues for the 2016 Palarong Pambansa
Bacolod	Visayas	Panaad Swimming Complex	50 m	25 m (10)	Part of the Panaad Park and Sports Complex. Bacolod's first and only 50m swimming pool
Tagbilaran	Visayas	Victoriano B. Tirol Aquatic Center	50 m	25 m (10)	Part of University of Bohol's Victoriano B. Tirol Jr. Sports Complex
San Jose de Buenavista	Visayas	Binirayan Sports Complex Swimming Pool	50 m	25 m (10)	Part of the Binirayan Sports Complex and one of the venues for the 2017 Palarong Pambansa
Los Baños	Luzon	Trace College Aquatics Centre	50 m	25 m (10)	Venue for the 2005 Southeast Asian Games
Baybay	Visayas	Visayas State University Swimming Pool	50 m	25 m (10)	
Cebu City	Visayas	Cebu City Sports Complex Swimming Pool	50 m	25 m (10)	Part of the Cebu City Sports Complex
Dapitan	Mindanao	Jose Rizal Memorial State University Sports Complex Swimming Pool	50 m	25 m (10)	Part of the Jose Rizal Memorial State University Sports Complex and one of the venues for the 2011 Palarong Pambansa
Imus	Luzon	Vermosa Sports Hub	50 m	25 m (10)	Proposed venue for the 2019 Southeast Asian Games
Dapa	Mindanao	Siargao Sports Complex Swimming Pool	50 m	25 m (10)	
Surigao City	Mindanao	Surigao Provincial Sports Complex - Swimming Pool	50 m	25 m (10)	Part of the Surigao Provincial Sports Complex. Renovated in 2020 from 8 lanes.
Quezon City	Luzon	Amoranto Sports Complex Swimming Pool	50 m	25 m (10)	Part of the Amoranto Sports Complex. Renovated in 2023.
Prosperidad	Mindanao	Democrito O. Plaza Memorial Sports Complex Aquatic Center	50 m	25 m (10)	Part of the Democrito O. Plaza Mamorial Sports Complex. Renovated in 2023.
Ormoc	Visayas	Ormoc City Sports Complex Swimming Pool	50 m	25 m (10)	Part of the Ormoc City Sports Complex.
La Trinidad	Luzon	Benguet Aquatic Center	50 m	25 m (10)	Part of the Benguet Sports Complex.
Digos	Mindanao	Davao del Sur Olympic Swimming Pool	50 m	25 m (10)	Part of the Davao del Sur Sports Complex.

=== Planned or under construction ===
Location		Pool/centre name	Pool dimensions		Further information
City	Island Group	Pool/centre name	Length	Width (lanes)	Further information
Bocaue	Luzon	Philippine Sports Center	50 m	25 m (10)	Under construction as of January 2019.
Davao City	Mindanao	Davao City - UP Aquatics Center	50 m	25 m (10)	Under construction as of January 2019 as part of the Davao City-UP Sports Complex and one of the venues for 2019 Palarong Pambansa.
Sindangan	Mindanao	Sindangan Municipal Olympic Swimming Pool	50 m	25 m (10)	Under construction

== Other 50 metre pools ==
Location		Pool/centre name	Pool dimensions		Further information
City	Island Group	Pool/centre name	Length	Width (lanes)	Further information
Nasipit	Mindanao	Saint Joseph Institute of Technology Cubi-Cubi Campus Swimming Pool	50 m	27.5 m (11)	
Marikina	Luzon	Marikina Sports Center Swimming Pool	50 m	22.5 m (9)	Opened in 1969, and renovated in 2001 and 2017; part of the Marikina Sports Center
Taguig	Luzon	Philippine Army Swimming Pool	50 m	22.5 m (9)	
Makati	Luzon	Makati Aqua Sports Arena	50 m	20 m (8)	
Iloilo City	Visayas	Iloilo Sports Complex Swimming Pool	50 m	20 m (8)	Part of the Iloilo Sports Complex
Iloilo City	Visayas	University of San Agustin Swimming Pool	50 m	20 m (8)	Part of University of San Agustin's sports facilities.
Roxas	Visayas	Villareal Stadium Swimming Pool	50 m	20 m (8)	Part of the Villareal Stadium
Zamboanga City	Mindanao	Joaquin F. Enriquez Memorial Sports Complex Swimming Pool	50 m	20 m (8)	Part of the Joaquin F. Enriquez Memorial Sports Complex
Tubod	Mindanao	Mindanao Civic Center Swimming Pool	50 m	20 m (8)	Part of the Mindanao Civic Center
Quezon City	Luzon	Amoranto Sports Complex Swimming Pool	50 m	20 m (8)	Part of the Amoranto Sports Complex
Naga	Luzon	Metro Naga Sports Complex Swimming Pool	50 m	20 m (8)	Part of the Metro Naga Sports Complex
Mati	Mindanao	Mati Centennial Sports Complex Swimming Pool	50 m	20 m (8)	Part of the Mati Centennial Sports Complex
Bantay	Luzon	Quirino Stadium Poolside	50 m	20 m (8)	Part of the Quirino Stadium and one of the venues for the 2018 Palarong Pambansa
Cagayan de Oro	Mindanao	Pelaez Sports Complex Swimming Pool	50 m	20 m (8)	Part of the Pelaez Sports Complex and one of the venues for the 1975, 1977, 1978, and 1988 Palarong Pambansa. Reopened in November 2016.
Batangas City	Luzon	Batangas Provincial Sports Complex Swimming Pool	50 m	20 m (8)	Part of the Batangas Provincial Sports Complex
Quezon City	Luzon	Philippine Science High School Swimming Pool	50 m	20 m (8)	
Santa Rosa	Luzon	Santa Rosa Multi-purpose Complex Swimming Pool	50 m	20 m (8)	Part of Santa Rosa Sports Complex
Palayan	Luzon	Nueva Ecija Sports Complex Swimming Pool	50 m	20 m (8)	Diving pool is never finished.
Cauayan	Luzon	Benjamin G. Dy Sports Complex Swimming Pool	50 m	20 m (8)	Part of the Benjamin G. Dy Sports Complex.

=== Planned or under construction/refurbishment ===
Location		Pool/centre name	Pool dimensions		Further information
City	Island Group	Pool/centre name	Length	Width (lanes)	Further information

== See also ==
- List of football stadiums in the Philippines
- List of indoor arenas in the Philippines
- List of baseball stadiums in the Philippines
- Philippine Swimming
