= Cauayan City Sports Complex =

Complex of sport facilities in Philippines

- Benjamin G. Dy Sports Complex
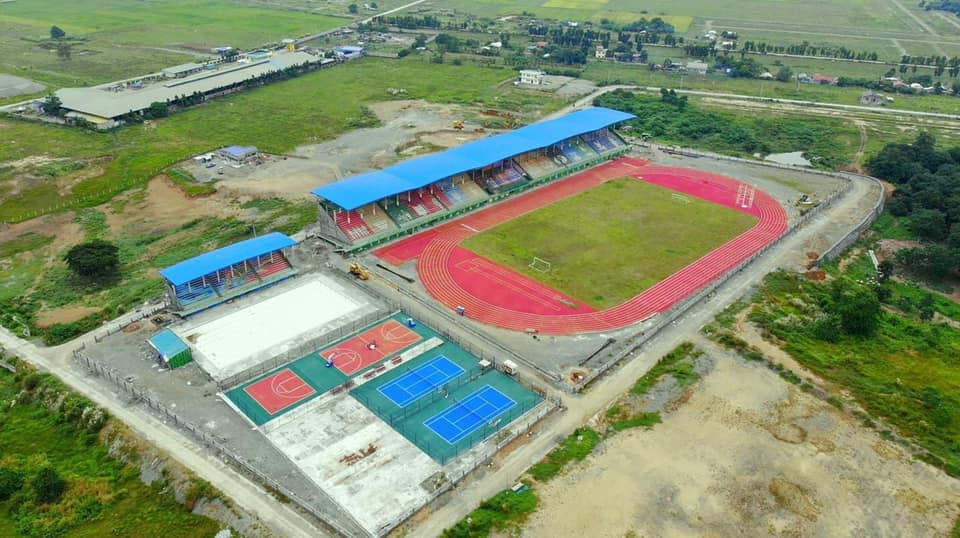
- Aerial view
- Interactive map of Cauayan City Sports Complex
- Full name: Benjamin G. Dy Sports Complex
- Location: Tagaran, Cauayan, Isabela, Philippines
- Coordinates: 16°58′01.7″N 121°45′51.2″E
- Owner: Cauayan City Government
- Operator: Cauayan City Government
- Main venue: Grandstand and Track Oval; Capacity: 6,000
- Facilities: Olympic-size Swimming Pool

Construction
- Groundbreaking: 2017
- Opened: TBA
- Cost: ₱400 Million

The Benjamin G. Dy Sports Complex, also known as Cauayan City Sports Complex, is a complex of sport facilities located at the city of Cauayan, Isabela.

== History ==
The 300-hectare complex was located at Brgy. Cabaruan, but later moved its location to Brgy. Tagaran. Mayor of Cauayan Bernard Dy said that the government will secure a loan from Land Bank of the Philippines. The ₱300 Million will be for construction of Sports Complex, while ₱100 Million for road infrastructures and lighting facilities. It was initially named Cauayan City Sports Complex by 2016, then later named Benjamin G. Dy Sports Complex to posthumously honor Governor of Isabela, Benjamin Dy.

== Facilities ==
Names	Maximum Seating Capacity	Broke Ground	Year opened	Description/Notes
Grandstand and Track Oval	6,000	2017	2020	
Swimming Pool	Unknown	2017	2020	

=== Other facilities ===
- 2 Tennis courts
- 2 Basketball courts (Including 1 3x3)

== See also ==
- Cauayan
- Isabela Sports Complex
- Ilagan Sports Complex
- List of football stadiums in the Philippines
- List of long course swimming pools in the Philippines
