= PVF Beach Volleyball tournament =

The PVF-Cantada Beach Volleyball tournaments is a once-a-month-only beach volleyball (with no registration fees) invitational tournament for men's and women's organized by the Philippine Volleyball Federation (PVF) thru their President Edgardo "Boy" Cantada, Secretary General Karl Chan, Managing Director Otie Camangian (which served as the tournament director), and Deputy Secretary General Gerard Cantada. It is held at the Cantada Sports Center, in Bagumbayan, Taguig, with the world-class indoor and outdoor sand beach volleyball courts, therefore it is not opened to the public, with strictly invitational basis. The tournament is mainly supported by Tanduay under the helm of Lucio "Bong" Tan.

Cantada has been organizing beach volleyball tournaments and promoting the sport, since 2005. Several members of the Bagwis and Amihan teams (the national teams of PVF) were also joined in this tournament.

== Developments ==
The PVF, thru its regional chapter based in the Cordillera Administrative Region, the Cordillera Volleyball Association, eyed for the staging of a national beach volleyball tournament to be held at the Baguio Athletic Bowl on March 5–6, 2016.

== Results ==
August 3, 2014 (Tanduay Light Women’s Beach Volleyball Challenge 1st Leg)

| Place | Players | Team |
|---|---|---|
| Champion | Amanda Villanueva/Marleen Cortel | Adamson University |
| 2nd Place | Beauty Denila/Anna Camille Abanto | Philippine Air Force |
| 3rd Place (tied) | Michelle Morente/Jhoana Maraguinot; Jaja Santiago/Fatima General | Ateneo de Manila University; National University |

November 9, 2014 (Tanduay Light Women’s Beach Volleyball Challenge 2nd Leg)

| Place | Players | Team |
|---|---|---|
| Champion | Judy Caballejo/Anna Camille Abanto | Philippine Air Force |
| 2nd Place | Beauty Denila/Gena Andaya | Philippine Air Force |

December 14, 2014 (Tanduay Light Women’s Beach Volleyball Challenge 3rd Leg)

| Place | Players | Team |
|---|---|---|
| Champion | Judy Caballejo/Anna Camille Abanto | Philippine Air Force |
| 2nd Place | Bea Tan/Dzi Gervacio | Ateneo de Manila University |
| 3rd Place | Jonafer San Pedro/Priscilla Catacutan | Rizal Technological University |
| 4th Place | Beauty Denila/Gena Andaya | Philippine Air Force |

March 1, 2015 (Tanduay Light Women’s Beach Volleyball Challenge 4th Leg)

| Place | Players | Team |
|---|---|---|
| Champion | Jovelyn Gonzaga/Nerissa Bautista | Philippine Army |
| 2nd Place | Judy Caballejo/Anna Camille Abanto | Philippine Air Force |
| 3rd Place | Aiza Maizo-Pontillas/Janine Marciano | Cagayan Valley Lady Rising Suns |

July 19, 2015 (Tanduay PVF Beach Volleyball Invitational 1st Leg/Inauguration of the Indoor Beach Volleyball Sand Court)

Men's

| Place | Players | Team |
|---|---|---|
| Champion | Jade Becaldo/Hach Gilbuena | SM By the Bay |
| 2nd Place | Henri James Pecana/Loujei Tigpos | PLDT |
| 3rd Place | Jessie Lopez/Jeffrey Malabanan | Philippine Air Force |
| 4th Place | Edwin Tolentino/Reuben Inaudito | National University |

Women's

| Place | Players | Team |
|---|---|---|
| Champion | Patty Orendain/Fiola Ceballos | Foton |
| 2nd Place | Jessa Aranda/Kryzel Cueva | UE |
| 3rd Place | Cindy Benitez/Florence Madulid | BENECO |
| 4th Place | Bea Tan/Alexa Micek | Foton; Petron |

September 19, 2015 (PVF Beach Volleyball Invitational 2nd Leg)

Men's

| Place | Players | Team |
|---|---|---|
| Champion | Jade Becaldo/Daniel Young | Cebu |
| 2nd Place | Roldan Medina/Nur Anin Madsairi | Tawi-Tawi |

Women's

| Place | Players | Team |
|---|---|---|
| Champion | Judy Caballejo/Camille Abanto | Air Force |
| 2nd Place | Beauty Denila/May Ann Pantino | Air Force |

October 24, 2015 (PVF-Tanduay Beach Volleyball Invitational 3rd Leg)

Men's

| Place | Players | Team |
|---|---|---|
| Champion | Mike Abria/Arvin Avila | Air Force-B |
| 2nd Place | Madsain Nul Amin/Roldan Medino | Navy-B |

Women's

| Place | Players | Team |
|---|---|---|
| Champion | Pau Soriano/Norie Jane Diaz | Navy-B |
| 2nd Place | Vina Alinas/Arielle Estranero | UP-Diliman |

December 5, 2015 (Tanduay-Summit Invitational Beach Volleyball 4th Leg)

Men's

| Place | Players | Team |
|---|---|---|
| Champion | Madsain Nul Amin and Roldan Medino | Navy |
| 2nd Place | Fadzi Ismael and Joseph Tipay | Navy |
| 3rd Place | Peter Galvan and Sammy Kharmmi | Rizal Technological University |

Women's

| Place | Players | Team |
|---|---|---|
| Champion | Iari Yongco and Beauty Denila | Air Force |
| 2nd Place | Joy Cases and Mayann Pantino | Air Force |
| 3rd Place | Marleen Cortel and Princess Listana | Adamson University |

== See also ==
- Philippine Volleyball Federation
