= Bukidnon Sports and Cultural Complex =

Complex of sport facilities in Philippines

- Bukidnon Sports Complex
- Interactive map of Bukidnon Sports and Cultural Complex
- Location: Laguitas, Malaybalay, Bukidnon, Philippines
- Coordinates: 8°05′26.0″N 125°07′42.7″E
- Owner: Bukidnon Provincial Government
- Operator: Bukidnon Provincial Government
- Main venue: Bukidnon Stadium; Capacity: 15,000
- Facilities: Gymnasium, Swimming Pool, Open Field

Construction
- Opened: 2024
- Architects: WTA Design & Architectural Studio

The Bukidnon Sports and Cultural Complex is a complex of sport facilities located in Malaybalay, Bukidnon, Philippines.

== History ==
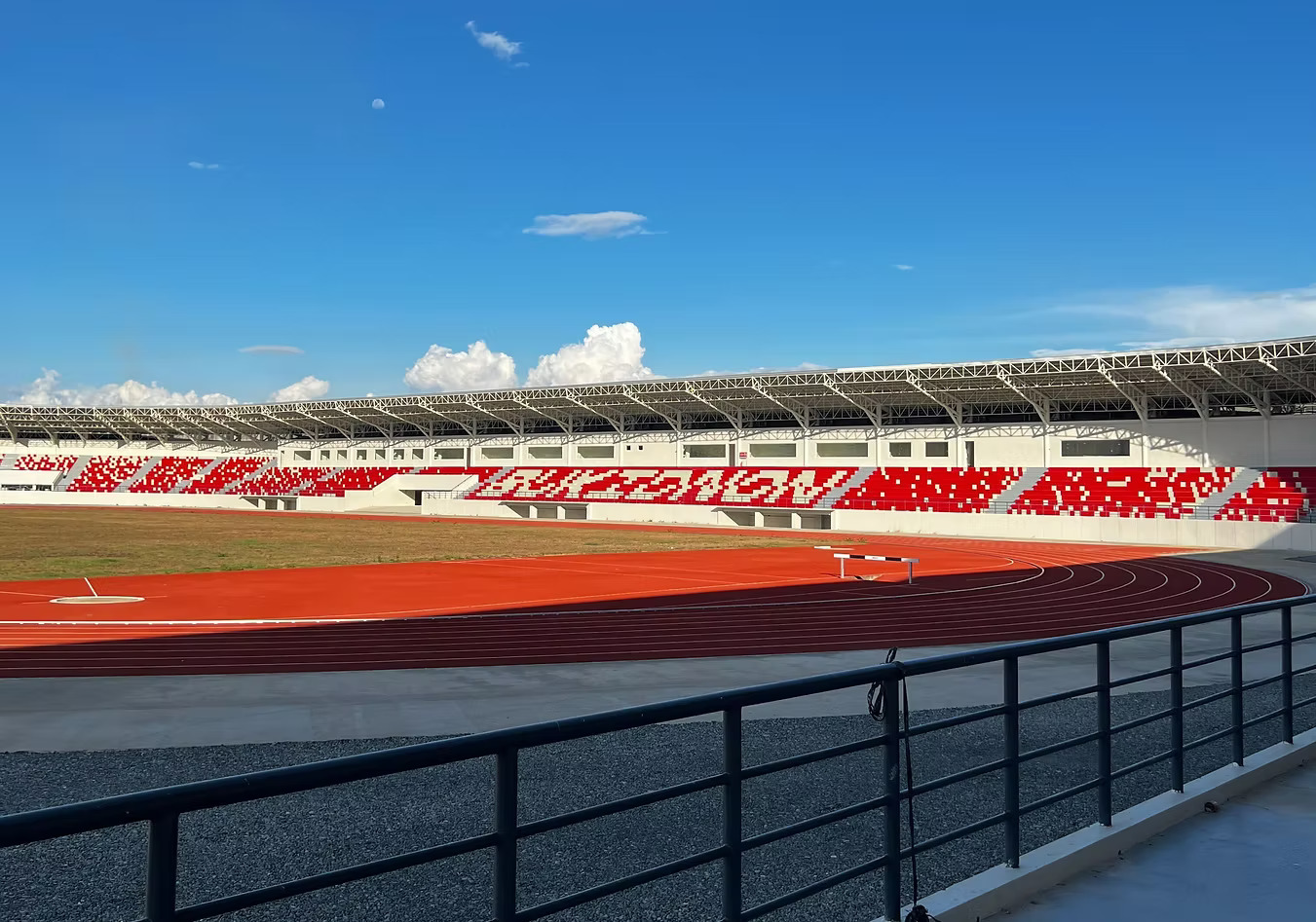
Inside Bukidnon Sports and Cultural Complex

There were plans to construct a provincial sports complex for Bukidnon in 2008 but this was later cancelled. In 2017, the idea was revived once again by Senator Migz Zubiri. The plan by WTA Design & Architectural Studio was approved by the Sangguniang Panlalawigan of Bukidnon. It was inaugurated on April 12, 2025.

== Facilities ==
Names	Seating capacity	Notes
Bukidnon Stadium	15,000	Includes a 8-lane rubberized athletics oval, and a 6,160 m^{2} (66,300 sq ft) football field
Swimming Pool	—N/a	With 10 lane, 50 m × 25 m (164 ft × 82 ft) pool and diving pool.
Gymnasium	3,000	
Open field	800	
Tennis Court	640	

== See also ==
- Malaybalay
- List of football stadiums in the Philippines
- List of indoor arenas in the Philippines
