= Private Schools Athletic Association (Philippines) =

Athletic association in the Philippines

Private Schools Athletic Association National Games
- Abbreviation: PRISAA
- Formation: February 17, 1953; 73 years ago
- Founder: Manuel Carreon
- Legal status: Association
- Region served: Philippines
- Chairman: Dr. Emmanuel Angeles
- Main organ: Board of Trustees

Private Schools Athletic Association (PRISAA), founded on February 17, 1953, is an association of private schools, Christian schools, and home school athletic departments throughout the Philippines.

The PRISAA exist to bring exposure and credibility to private schools across the nation. The PRISAA accomplishes this with tournaments, national rankings, player/coaching awards and recruiting services.

== History ==
Palarong Pambansa veteran Lorendale Echavez made waves in her debut in the Private Schools Athletic Association (PRISAA) National Games Sunday by snaring 2 gold medals to highlight hostilities at the Joaquin Enriquez Memorial Sports Complex (JEMSC) in Zamboanga City. The 17-year-old University of San Carlos biology freshman won the women's 200-meter freestyle in 2 minutes and 15.31 seconds, sinking the 3-year-old record of 2:24.69 set also here by Chrizel Lagunday.

== Regular Sports ==
- Football
- Baseball
- Basketball
- Boxing
- Chess
- Dancesport
- Sepak takraw (Boys)
- Softball
- Swimming
- Table tennis
- Taekwondo
- Tennis
- Volleyball

== 2017 PRISAA National Games ==
It was first announced that the 2017 PRISAA National games will be held at Isabela, Cagayan, but because Cagayan was devastated by Typhoon, the PRISAA National games was forced to move the tournament to Iba, Zambales.

=== Sporting Venues ===
Regular Events
Event	Venue	Municipality
Basketball	Zambales Sports Complex	Iba, Zambales
Volleyball	Bancal Barangay Plaza	Botolan, Zambales
Volleyball	Palanginan Barangay Plaza	Iba, Zambales

=== Medal tally ===
Senior Division
	(gold) Gold	(silver) Silver	(bronze) Bronze	Total	Ranking
Region I	6	16	13	35	9
Region II	1	12	12	25	12
Region III	1	4	14	19	13
Region IV-A	36	29	62	127	4th
Region IV-B	-	2	2	4	16
Region V	-	22	20	42	14
Region VI	53	53	65	171	2nd
Region VII	124	64	59	247	1st
Region VIII	6	2	8	16	10
Region IX	23	17	13	53	6
Region X	2	4	9	15	11
Region XI	26	59	54	139	5
Region XII	18	23	37	78	7
ARMM	-	3	-	3	15
CAR	15	27	53	95	8
CARAGA	-	1	3	4	17
NIR	38	2	12	52	3rd

Junior Division
	(gold) Gold	(silver) Silver	(bronze) Bronze	Total	Ranking
Region I	-	-	-	-	
Region II	2	3	6	11	12
Region III	33	53	27	113	2nd
Region IV-A	16	1	4	21	7
Region IV-B	6	25	47	78	9
Region V	-	1	3	4	13
Region VI	92	43	23	158	1st
Region VII	16	20	7	43	6
Region VIII	-	-	-	-	
Region IX	21	1	5	27	4th
Region X	3	22	11	36	10
Region XI	17	26	38	81	5
Region XII	-	-	-	-	
ARMM	3	-	-	3	11
CAR	7	12	8	27	8
CARAGA	-	-	-	-	
NIR	26	16	4	46	3rd

== PRISAA National Games host cities ==
Year	Games	Division	Venue	Host city	(gold) Champion	(gold) First	(gold) Second	(gold) Third
1969	15		Rodriguez Sports Center	Marikina, Rizal	(#)	(#)	(#)	(#)
1991	-		Pampanga Sports Complex	San Fernando, Pampanga	(#)	(#)	(#)	(#)
1992	-		Iloilo Sports Complex	Iloilo City	(#)	(#)	(#)	(#)
1993	-		Joaquin F. Enriquez Memorial Stadium	Zamboanga City	(#)	(#)	(#)	(#)
1994	-				(#)	(#)	(#)	(#)
1995	-				(#)	(#)	(#)	(#)
1996	-				(#)	(#)	(#)	(#)
1997	-		Abellana Sports Complex	Cebu City	(#)	(#)	(#)	(#)
1998	Games were cancelled.							
1999	Games were cancelled.							
2000	Games were cancelled.							
2001	-			Angeles City	(#)	(#)	(#)	(#)
2002	-			Cebu City	(#)	(#)	(#)	(#)
2003	-			Angeles City	(#)	(#)	(#)	(#)
2004	-		Panaad Park and Stadium	Bacolod	(#)	(#)	(#)	(#)
2005	-		Joaquin F. Enriquez Memorial Stadium	Zamboanga City	(#)	(#)	(#)	(#)
2006	-		Narciso Ramos Sports and Civic Center	Dagupan	(#)	(#)	(#)	(#)
2007	-		Iloilo Sports Complex	Iloilo City	(#)	(#)	(#)	(#)
2008	-		Joaquin F. Enriquez Memorial Stadium	Zamboanga City	(#)	(#)	(#)	(#)
2009	-			Naga City	(#)	(#)	(#)	(#)
2010	-			NCR-Manila	(#)	(#)	(#)	(#)
2011	-		Joaquin F. Enriquez Memorial Stadium	Zamboanga City	(70) Region VII	(66) Region XI	(58) Region VI	(58) Region 4-A
2012	-		Cebu City Sports Center	Cebu City	(#)	(#)	(#)	(#)
2013	-		Narciso Ramos Sports and Civic Center	Lingayen, Pangasinan	(#)	(#)	(#)	(#)
2014	-		Davao del Norte Sports and Tourism Complex	Tagum, Davao del Norte	(#)	(#)	(#)	(#)
2015	-		Iloilo Sports Complex	Iloilo City	(#)	(#)	(#)	(#)
2016	-	Senior	South Cotabato Sports Complex	Koronadal City	(#)	(#)	(#)	(#)
2016	-	Junior	South Cotabato Sports Complex	Koronadal City	(#)	(#)	(#)	(#)
2017	-	Senior	Zambales Sports Complex	Iba, Zambales	(124) Region VII	(53) Region VI	(38) NIR	(36) Region 4-A
2017	-	Junior	Zambales Sports Complex	Iba, Zambales	(92) Region VI	(33) Region III	(26) NIR	(21) Region IX
2018	-	Senior	Carlos P. Garcia Sports Complex	Bohol	(#)	(#)	(#)	(#)
2018	-	Junior	Carlos P. Garcia Sports Complex	Bohol	(#)	(#)	(#)	(#)
2019	-	Senior	UMin Sports Complex	Davao City	(#)	(#)	(#)	(#)
2019	-	Junior	UMin Sports Complex	Davao City	(#)	(#)	(#)	(#)
2020	Cancelled due to coronavirus pandemic.							
2021	Cancelled due to coronavirus pandemic.							
2022	Cancelled due to coronavirus pandemic.							
2023	-	Senior	Joaquin F. Enriquez Memorial Stadium	Zamboanga City	(#)	(#)	(#)	(#)
2023	-	Junior	Joaquin F. Enriquez Memorial Stadium	Zamboanga City	(#)	(#)	(#)	(#)
2024	-	Senior	Bicol University Sports Complex	Legazpi, Albay	(#)	(#)	(#)	(#)
2024	-	Junior	Bicol University Sports Complex	Legazpi, Albay	Gold 84 Silver 63 Bronze 53 (200) Bicol Region	Gold 73 Silver 41 Bronze 35 (149) Calabarzon	Gold 54 Silver 68 Bronze 59 (181) Western Visayas	Gold 41 Silver 35 Bronze 65 (141) Central Luzon

== Mutya ng PRISAA (National Level) ==
Year	Mutya ng PRISAA	1st Runner-up	2nd Runner-up	3rd Runner-up	4th Runner-up
2017	Sharifa Aqeel; Region 12	Region 3	Region 7	Region 8	Region 4-B

== See also ==
- 2018 PRISAA National Games
