= Butuan Polysports Complex =

Sports complex in Butuan, Philippines

- Butuan City Polysports Complex and Recreational Center
- Aerial view as of June 2025
- Interactive map of Butuan Polysports Complex
- Location: Brgy. Tiniwisan, Butuan, Agusan del Norte, Philippines
- Coordinates: 08°58′07.0″N 125°35′28.0″E
- Owner: City Government of Butuan
- Operator: City Government of Butuan
- Capacity: 3,672 (Football Stadium, current)
- Surface: Natural grass

Construction
- Built: 2013
- Opened: November 11, 2015
- Closed: August 7, 2016 (Temporary)
- Reopened: TBA 2027 (rubberized track oval and artificial football field only)
- Cost: ₱253 million (construction, 2013) ₱190 million (rubberized track oval and artificial football field rehabilitation only, 2026)
- General contractor: J.D. Legaspi Construction

Tenant
- Butuan Agusan del Norte F.A.

Butuan Polysports Complex, is a sports complex currently under rehabilitation, redevelopment, and refurbishment in Barangay Tiniwisan, Butuan, Philippines. The sports complex is the venue of athletic events for both Agusan del Norte and Caraga region. As of 2026, there are only 3 sport venues inside the complex which have been completed. These are: Polysports Basketball Arena, Polysports Football Stadium, in which the rubberized track oval and the football field was subject for rehabilitation, and the Polysports Baseball Park which was currently used for Butuan City Division Meet 2026.

== Construction ==
Construction for the sports complex started in 2012 when the old sports complex in Libertad was unfinished.

== Controversy ==
In November 2015, J.D. Legaspi had expired the mayor's permit, according to the COA. In December 2015, the previous mayor probed for plunder and graft over P253,000,000 sports complex contract. However, in February 2016, the previous mayor ordered to arrest 43 Brgy. Captains for perjury and vexation and the connection of the polysports complex contract. In April 2016, 3 out of 43 Brgy. Captains were arrested by the local police for using drugs, and illegal possession of firearms and ammunition. As of now, only the rubberized track oval, football field, and the basketball gymnasium have been completed so far, however; Former Mayor Jun Amante and the establishment are still investigated by Commission on Audit and its still cannot be used and at the moment.

== Sporting Events ==
=== Athletics ===
The Polysports Complex hosted the Pinoyathletics competition Battle of Butuan on April 24, 2021. The 100 dash lane will using 7 lanes, as lane 1 is overgrown by grass and unusable, and also the track oval is oversized at 415m, and its very difficult to accurate lane measurements.

The Polysports Complex once again hosted the Pinoyathletics competition Mindanao Track League on unscheduled date of May, and once again its Leg 3 on December 4, 2021.

=== Football ===
The Polysports Complex hosted the 2023 PFF Boys U-19 National Championship Division 2 Group G organized by Philippine Football Federation.

=== Others ===
The Polysports Complex hosted the 2016 Caraga Regional Athletic Meet in which the Butuan City Team wins overall.

The Polysports Complex was used by the 2023 Caraga Athletic Association-Regional Sports Competition for Football and Archery tournament.

== Facilities ==
Image	Names	Maximum Seating Capacity	Broke Ground	Year opened	Description/Notes
	Polysports Basketball Arena	4,000	2013	February 4, 2016	Currently under investigation by COA, and closure for rehabilitation process.
	Polysports Football Stadium	3,672 (Football); 35,000 (Concert)	2013	November 11, 2015	New record attendance. Currently under rehabilitation for newly rubberized track oval and artificial football field as of July 29, 2026.
	Polysports Baseball Park	1,800	February 1, 2016	February 4, 2016	Prior to the Caraga Regional Athletic Meet 2016. Currently under refurbishment and restoration for the upcoming Butuan City Division Meet 2026 on September 7.

== Gallery ==
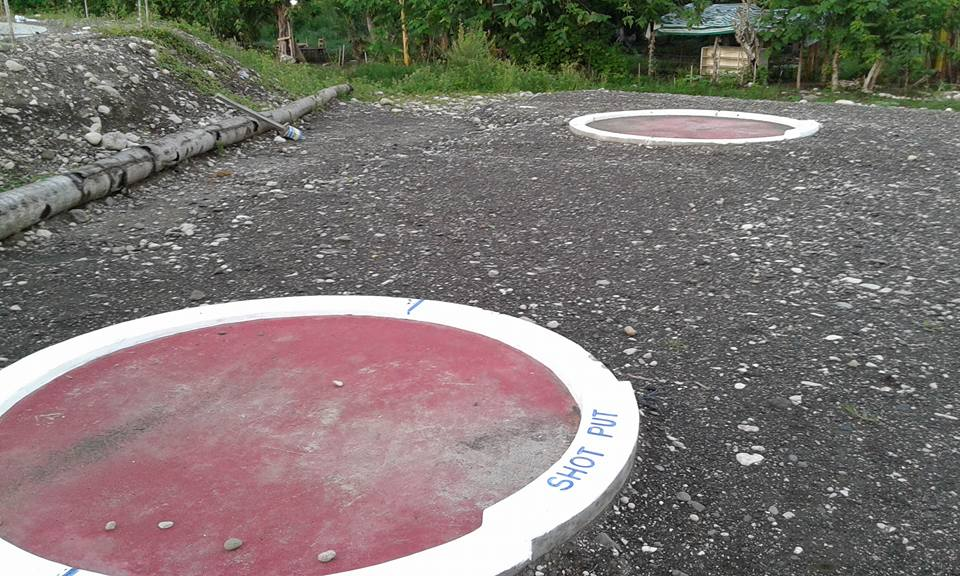
Baseball Shot Puts (inactive)

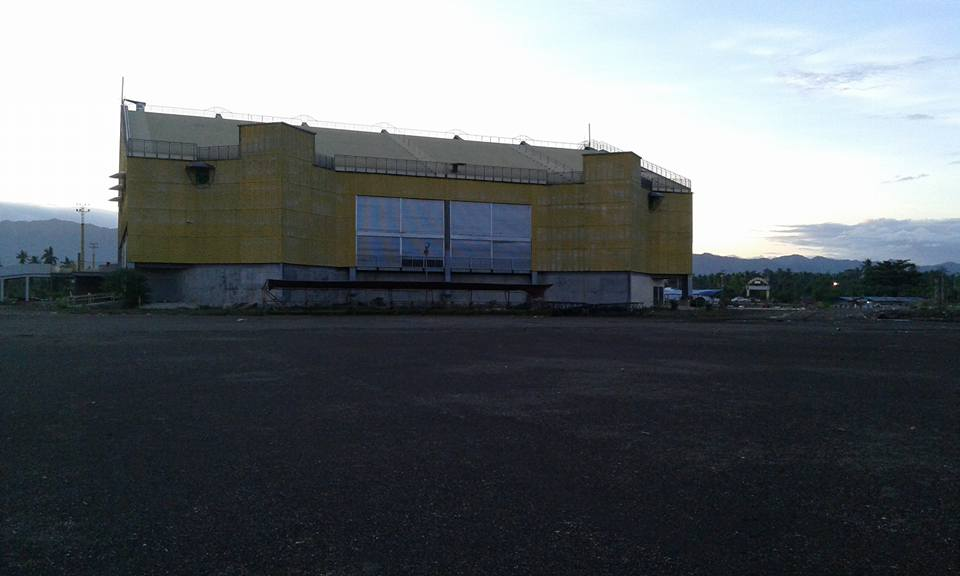
Baseball Bleacher (inactive)

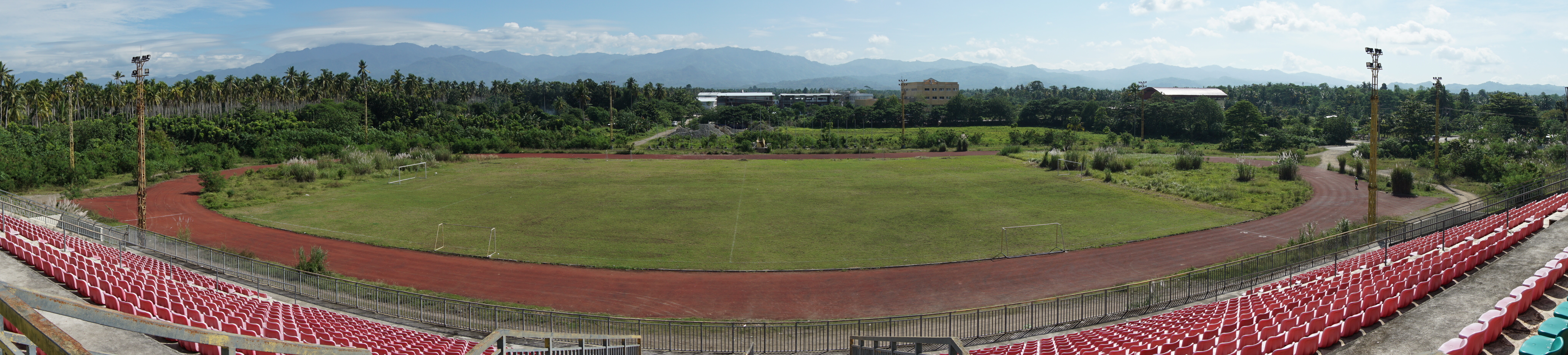
Football field remains active

== See also ==
- Butuan
- List of indoor arenas in the Philippines
- List of football stadiums in the Philippines
- List of baseball stadiums in the Philippines
