= List of baseball stadiums in the Philippines =

The following is a list of baseball stadiums in the Philippines, ordered by capacity.

== Current stadiums ==
Image	Stadium	Capacity	City	Island Group	Opened
	Rizal Memorial Baseball Stadium	10,000	Manila	Luzon	1934
	Joaquin F. Enriquez Memorial Sports Complex baseball field	10,000	Zamboanga City	Mindanao	1992
	Cagayan Sports Complex baseball field	6,000	Tuguegarao	Luzon	
	Felino Marcelino Sr. Baseball Stadium	850	Taguig	Luzon	
	University of the Philippines baseball field	100	Quezon City	Luzon	
	Panaad Baseball Field	100	Bacolod	Visayas	
	The Villages Sports Complex baseball field		Mabalacat	Luzon	

== See also ==
- List of football stadiums in the Philippines
- List of indoor arenas in the Philippines
- List of long course swimming pools in the Philippines
- Baseball in the Philippines
