= Bacolod Arts & Youth Sports Center =

Public gymnasium in Bacolod, Philippines

BAYS Center
- Interactive map of BAYS Center
- Location: Bacolod, Negros Occidental, Philippines
- Coordinates: 10°37′31″N 122°57′55″E
- Owner: Bacolod City Government
- Capacity: 1,000+
- Surface: 1 hectare

The Bacolod Arts and Youth Sports Center (BAYS Center) is a multi-use gym located in Bacolod, fronting the Bacolod Public Plaza, in Negros Occidental, Philippines. It is used mostly for basketball, karatedo and boxing matches, and was used in events in the city like the MassKara Festival activities and other government related activities like seminars, business and political gatherings.

It was the venue of the UMA-ONEBA and NOKAF Championships in which the Western Visayas athletes participated in sporting events.

The gym has a seating capacity of more than a thousand. It is officially designated as the COMELEC tally headquarters for both local and national election in the Philippines.

Aside from the gym, it also serves as offices of the departments of the city and also serves as cultural facilities.

== See also ==
- Bacolod
- NOMPAC
- La Salle Coliseum
- Bacolod City Arena
