= Negros Occidental Multi-Purpose Activity Center =

Public gymnasium in Bacolod, Philippines

- Interactive map of Negros Occidental Multi-Purpose Activity Center
- Location: Bacolod, Negros Occidental, Philippines
- Coordinates: 10°40′39″N 122°57′09″E
- Owner: Negros Occidental Provincial Government
- Capacity: 1000+
- Surface: 1 hectare

The Negros Occidental Multi-Purpose Activity Center (NOMPAC) is a provincial-owned multi-use gym located in Bacolod, adjacent to the Capitol Lagoon, in Negros Occidental, Philippines. It is currently used mostly for basketball, karatedo and boxing matches.

Aside from the gym, it also serves as evacuation site of the province during calamities likewise also serves as cultural facilities in many events and other government related activities like seminars, business and political gatherings.

== See also ==
- Bacolod
- Negros Occidental
- BAYS Center
- La Salle Coliseum
- Bacolod City Arena
