= 2018 PRISAA National Games =

The 2018 PRISAA National Games was the 2018 edition of the annual sports competition for student-athletes from privately owned schools throughout the 17 regions of the Philippines. The National Games is organized by the Private Schools Athletic Association (PRISAA).

The games were hosted by Bohol and ran from April 22–27, 2018. The opening ceremony was held at the Carlos P. Garcia Sports Complex and the closing ceremony was held at the Bohol Cultural Center, both located in Tagbilaran City, Bohol.

This was the first time that Bohol hosted the games, after 71 years.

At the end of the event, Central Visayas dominated the PRISAA National Games with 255 medals, claiming their fourth-straight overall seniors championship.

== Sports ==
An estimated number of 4,000 student-athletes from 17 (formerly 18 due to dissolution of the Negros Island Region in 2017) regions in the country participated in 18 regular sports and non-sporting competitions.

=== Regular Sports ===
- Athletics
- Badminton
- Badminton
- Basketball
- Boxing
- Chess
- Dancesport
- Football
- Karatedo
- Lawn tennis
- Sepak takraw
- Softball
- Swimming
- Table tennis
- Taekwondo
- Volleyball (Indoor and Beach)
- Weightlifting

=== Non-Sporting Events ===
- Mutya ng PRISAA (Miss PRISAA)
- Oratorical Contest
- Singing Competition
