= Siargao Island Sports Complex =

Complex of sport facilities in Philippines

- Siargao Island Tourism & Sports Center
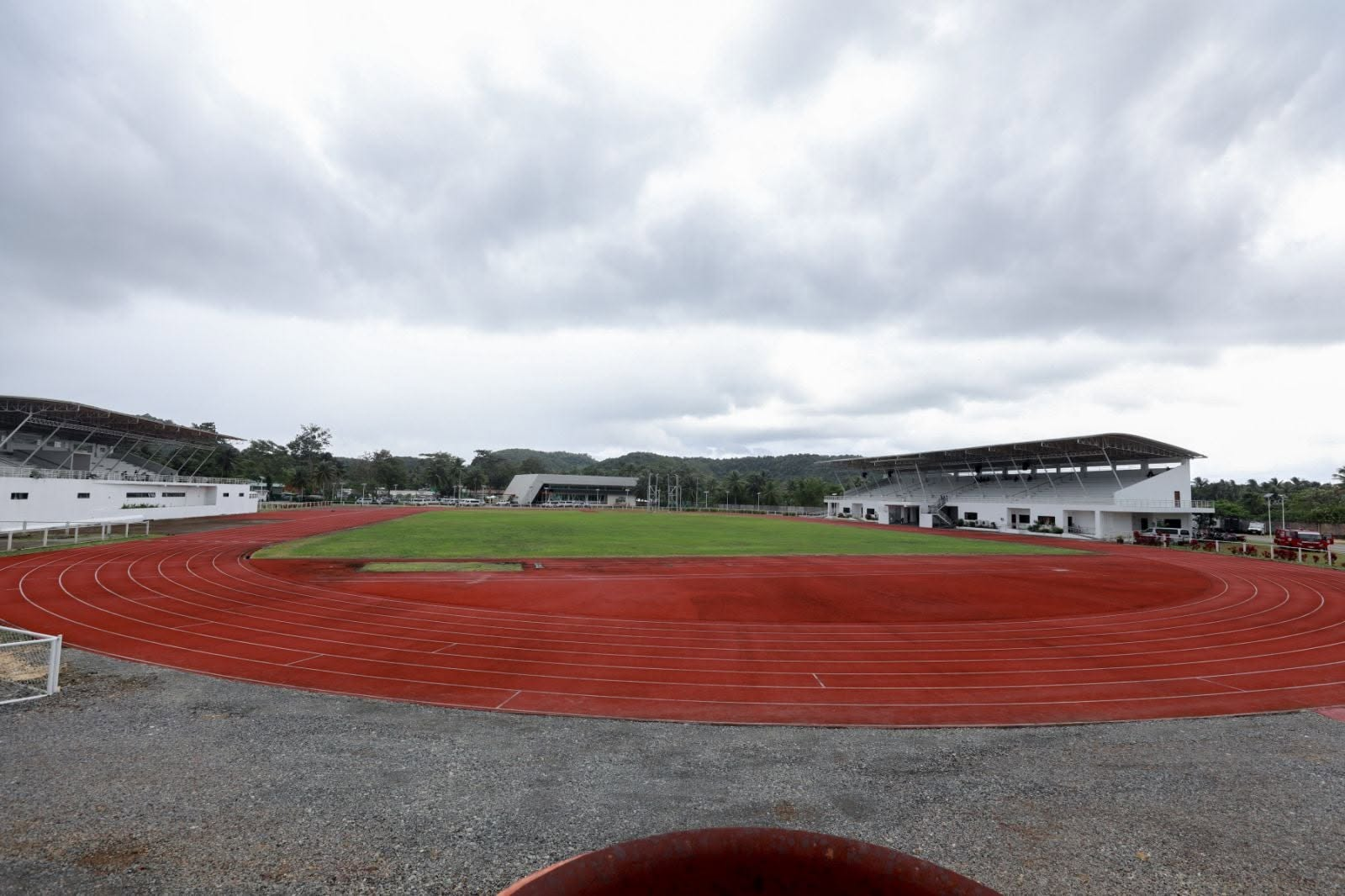
- Sports complex in 2021
- Interactive map of Siargao Island Sports Complex
- Full name: Siargao Island Tourism & Sports Center
- Location: Brgy. Osmena, Dapa, Surigao del Norte, Philippines
- Coordinates: 09°46′48.5″N 126°04′24.9″E
- Owner: Surigao del Norte Provincial Government
- Operator: Surigao del Norte Provincial Government
- Main venue: Main Stadium
- Facilities: Multi-purpose Gymnasium, Dormitory, Olympic-size Swimming Pool, Convention Center

Construction
- Groundbreaking: 2017
- Built: January 2020
- Opened: November 2021
- Cost: ₱600 Million

The Siargao Island Sports and Tourism Complex (SISTC) is a sports complex in Dapa, Surigao del Norte, Philippines.

== Construction ==
In November 2016, Surigao del Norte Governor Sol Matugas announced that 1.2 billion pesos had been allocated to improve infrastructure in the region. Siargao Sports Complex was given over 300 million pesos of that commitment. The sports complex was completed by January 15, 2020.

President Rodrigo Duterte led the inauguration of the facility on November 6, 2021.

== Incidents ==
During Typhoon Rai in 2021, the complex suffered damage as the roof of the complex blew off due to high winds. The complex was used as an evacuation site during that time.

The complex was also used as a quarantine facility during the COVID-19 pandemic.

== Facilities ==
The sports complex covers an area of 63,157 m^{2} (679,820 sq ft). The main stadium has two grandstand structures which also function as multi-purpose buildings and a track oval. The complex also includes a multi-purpose gymnasium, a swimming pool, a dormitory, and a convention center.

== See also ==
- Dapa
- Butuan Polysports Complex
- Surigao Provincial Sports Complex
- List of indoor arenas in the Philippines
- List of football stadiums in the Philippines
