= Clark Entertainment and Events Hub =

Planned mixed-use development in the Philippines

Project
- Completed: 2028; 2 years' time
- Developer: Clark International Airport Corporation

Location
- Country: Philippines
- Location: Clark Freeport Zone, Mabalacat, Pampanga

Area
  - Total: 40 ha (99 acres)

The Clark Entertainment and Events Hub is planned mixed-use development at the Clark Freeport Zone in Pampanga, Philippines.

== Background ==
The entertainment hub is a project initiated by state-run Clark International Airport Corporation (CIAC), which is an attached entity to the Bases Conversion and Development Authority. Conceptualized in October 2023, it is to be developed through a public–private partnership with investors expressing interest as early as November 2023.

The project covering 40 hectares (99 acres) has an estimated cost of ₱32 billion with construction projected to take place from 2025 to 2028.

== Features ==
=== Clark Arena ===
The Clark Arena is an indoor arena with a planned seating capacity of 25,000 to 35,000.

The CIAC markets the arena to be "Taylor Swift ready by 2028". Despite the reference, there is no scheduled event featuring Swift at the planned venue and it was clarified the musician is used as a benchmark so that the arena have the capacity to host similarly renowned artists. It was also pitched to bring the Olympic Games and the National Football League’s International Series to the Philippines.

=== Other ===
Other planned features is the Clark International Convention Center, which is tagged as the flagship facility of the entertainment hub; Clark Airport Mall, the Clark Aviation School, a Multi-modal Mobility Hub, and a housing complex.
