= Bacolod City Arena =

Proposed indoor arena in Bacolod, Philippines

- Location: Bacolod, Negros Occidental, Philippines

Construction
- Built: Proposed

The Bacolod City Arena was a proposed multipurpose indoor arena in Bacolod, Philippines.

== History ==
=== Development ===
The local government intended the venue to be one of the venues for the 2019 FIBA World Cup if the Philippines' bid was successful. Though the venue wasn't among the four proposed venues presented to FIBA during the final bid presentation.

However, the Philippines lost its bid to China for the 2019 FIBA World Cup hosting. It was planned that if the Philippines' bid were successful, construction of the Bacolod City Arena would commence in 2016 or 2017.

The Bacolod City Government acquired 8 hectares (20 acres) of land from the Philippine Reclamation Authority as part of the latter's share in a reclamation project with Bacolod Real Estate Development Corp. (BREDCO). The parcel of land was worth P600 million. The city government plans to construct the arena in the acquired reclaimed land through a public-private partnership. By August 2015, a businessman had pledged to build the arena on the city's property.

The project was, however, mothballed after the defeat of then-Mayor Monico Puentevella. Incumbent Mayor Evelio Leonardia allocated a separate structure of the same kind, known as the Bacolod Masskara Coliseum, in Barangay Alijis instead. As of 2022, the coliseum is already under construction.
