= Baguio Athletic Bowl =

Sports complex in Baguio, Philippines

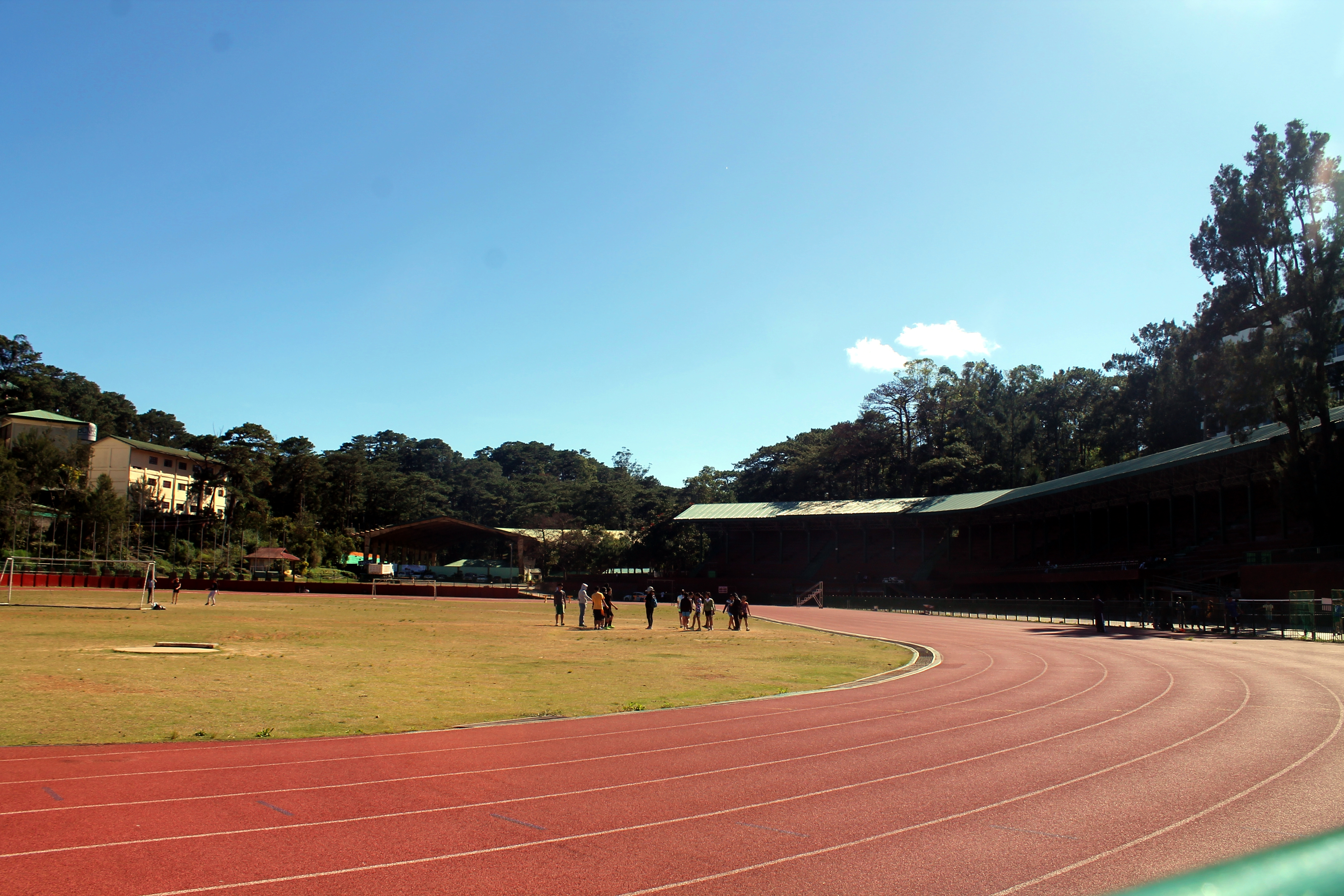
- The sports complex's track and field track and grandstand in 2018.
- Interactive map of Baguio Athletic Bowl
- Address: Burnham Park
- Location: Baguio, Philippines
- Coordinates: 16°24′28″N 120°35′45″E
- Owner: Philippine Tourism Authority
- Operator: Baguio City Government
- Main venue: Track Oval and Grandstand; Capacity: 1,100
- Facilities: Swimming pool; 4 tennis courts
- Acreage: 7 hectares (70,000 m^{2})

Construction
- Built: 1945
- Renovated: 2014–2016, 2020

The Baguio Athletic Bowl is a 7-hectare sports complex within the grounds of Burnham Park in Baguio, Philippines. Completed in 1945, it is currently undergoing renovation work.

== History ==
The Baguio Athletic Bowl was built in 1945. The venue is under the ownership of the Philippine Tourism Authority (PTA). Through Executive Order 224 issued by President Fidel V. Ramos on February 10, 1995, transferring the management, administration, and maintenance responsibilities from the PTA to the Baguio City Government.

In the early 2000s, the sports complex's Olympic-size swimming pool was built.

Further powers were given to the city government when it is given rights to “control and further development" of Burnham Park in pursuant to Executive Order 695 issued by President Gloria Macapagal Arroyo issued on January 10, 2008.

=== 2009 proposal ===
The Baguio City Government leased the park to an undisclosed company to develop the Athletic Bowl and Burnham Park for P1.43 per square meter. The deal between the investors and the city government was reached on December 10, 2009, and was later approved by the city council on December 11 of the same year. The property would have been leased for 25 years with a monthly lease of P100,000 per month, with a 10 percent increased after five years. The plan involved building a hotel, a driving range, and a bus terminal. The planned development was a subject of controversy among Baguio residents. On January 8, 2010, Baguio City Mayor Reinaldo Bautista, Jr. said that the plan is not yet final and is still a proposal. The proposal was later scrapped by the city government.

=== 2014-2016 renovations ===
In 2012, Mayor Mauricio Domogan announced new plans to development of the Baguio Athletic Bowl and Burnham Park. The plan generated concerns with Councilor Edison Bilog calling Baguio residents to remain vigilant against commercialization of the park and cutting of trees for the development particular those at the World Park at the back of the Athletic Bowl. Domogan responded that the trees mentioned by Bilog will not be affected by the development and that he has sent the terms of reference of the project to the city council.

At least three phases of renovation work are planned for the Athletic Bowl. Phase 1 involved the construction of a multipurpose office, a grandstand and the 75 percent completion of the venue's bleachers. The bleachers were installed by Department of Public Works and Highways-Cordillera. Phase 1 was completed in January 2015 and Phase 2 of the renovation work started. Phase 2 was suspended in early February 2015 due to Baguio's hosting of the 2015 Cordillera Administrative Region Athletic Association Meet and the annual Panagbenga Festival celebrations. Phase 2 resumed after the conclusion of Panagbenga celebrations in March.

Phase 2, was planned to be completed by February 2016, in time for the 2016 Cordillera Administrative Region Athletic Association (Caraa) meet which involved the installing of rubber tracks from Switzerland, continuation of unfinished bleachers and repair of the venue's old drainage system. Spurway Enterprises and R.U. Aquino Construction were involved in this phase.

=== 2016 Reopening and further refurbishment ===
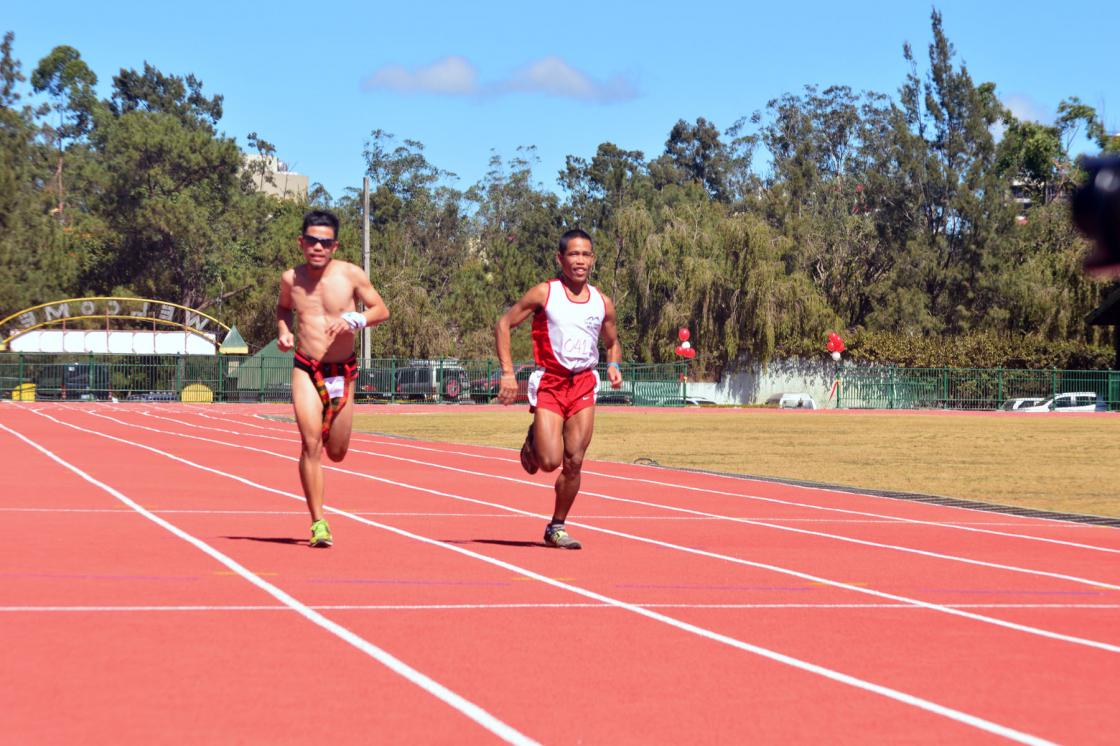
Local runner, James Tellas running in a traditional bahag outfit with a companion as part of the inauguration ceremony of the then newly installed rubberized track on January 29, 2016.

The Baguio Athletic Bowl was reopened to the public on January 29, 2016, following about two years of renovations. A 5,000 meter fun run activity was organized as part of the reopening ceremonies.

On March 13, 2020, a groundbreaking ceremony was held marking the start of renovation works including the expansion of the grandstand by 50 meters (160 ft) adding some 360 additional seats as well as the installation of lights. However renovation works was suspended due to the Luzon enhanced community quarantine imposed to contain the COVID-19 pandemic. Works are set to resume sometime in August 2020. The City Government has already started bidding for two major projects within the sports complex: A multi-level parking structure and a Youth Convergence center which would allow the city to host indoor sports competitions.

== Facilities ==
As its name suggest, the main facility of the Baguio Athletic Bowl is its track and field or athletics oval complemented by a grandstand structure with 1,100 seating capacity. The Baguio Tennis Club manages four tennis courts inside the sports complex. The Athletic Bowl also hosts a swimming pool.
