= Joaquin F. Enriquez Memorial Sports Complex =

Multi-use stadium in Zamboanga City, Philippines

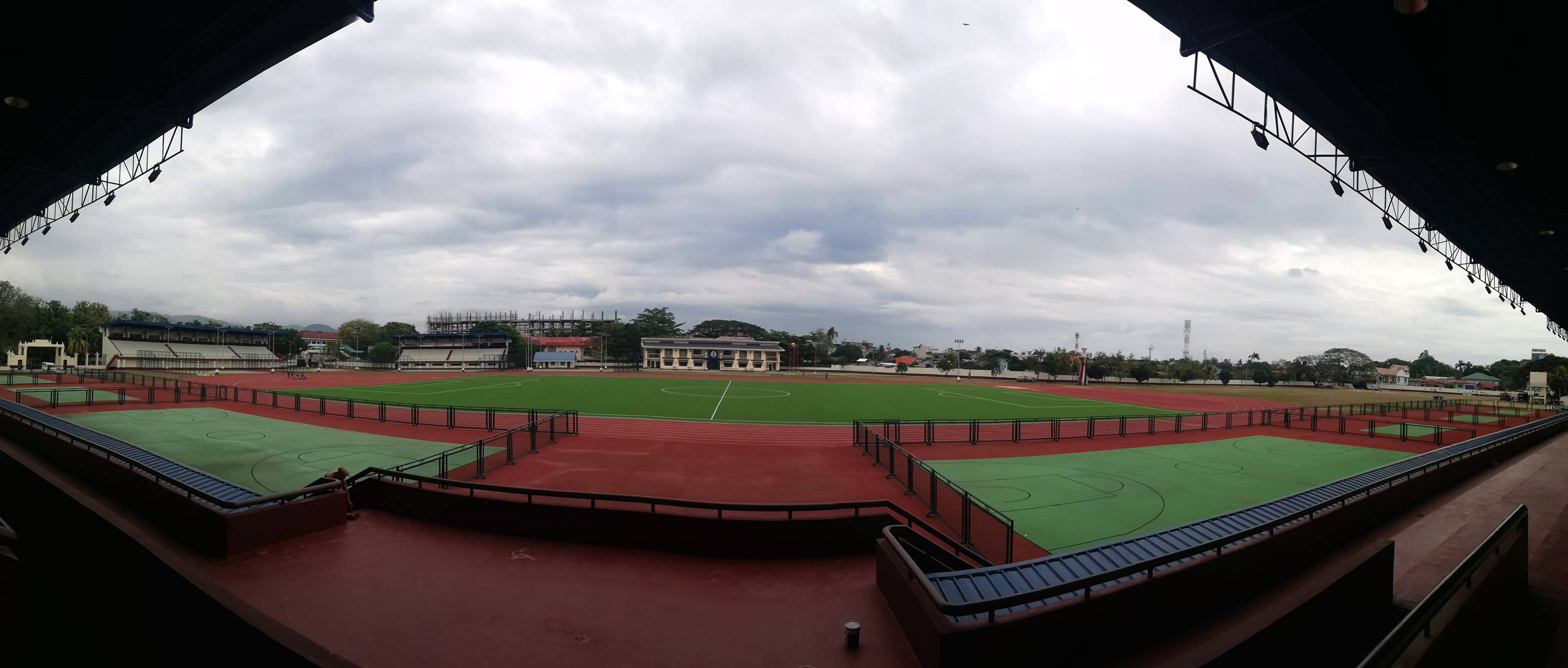
- Interactive map of Joaquin F. Enriquez Memorial Sports Complex
- Address: Zamboanga City; Philippines
- Main venue: Joaquin F. Enriquez Memorial Stadium; Capacity: 10,000
- Facilities: Swimming pool, basketball courts, tennis courts

Construction
- Opened: 1992
- Cost: ₱65 million

The Joaquin F. Enriquez Memorial Sports Complex is a multi-use stadium in Zamboanga City, Philippines. The bleachers have a seating capacity of 10,000 people.

== History ==
=== Construction and the 1991 Palarong Pambansa ===
The Joaquin F. Enriquez Memorial Sports Complex was built for the purpose of Zamboanga City's hosting of the 1992 Palarong Pambansa. It was built at the cost of ₱65 million through the cooperation of the city government and the Department of Education, Culture, and Sports. The sports complex which was erected under the administration of Mayor Vitaliano Agan.

Construction works were hampered by the Visayas–Mindanao power crisis with Pampanga being considered as a backup host to the Palaro. German firm Reichert and Co. installed the synthetic athletic track The implementation of which was delayed by a dispute by Sierra Commercial.

The opening ceremony for the national students games on March 8, 1992, was held at partially built stadium.

=== Post-Palaro (1993–2012) ===
In 2005, it was the main venue of the National PRISAA Games which gathered athletes from all over the private schools in the country. In 2007, the PASUC-National Sports Olympics, a competition between public colleges and university varsity teams, was held here.

In 2011, the PRISAA was participated in by more than 400 member colleges and universities from the country's 17 regions. More than 5,000 athletes and officials participated in the games.

=== Disuse and eventual renovation (2013–2023) ===
The stadium along with the rest of the facilities of the sports complex were damaged following the 2013 Zamboanga City siege by the Moro National Liberation Front. The stadium was used as an evacuation site by people displaced by the attacks and had to undergo renovation from 2016 to 2019.

It was reinaugurated in February 2019. However it was closed due as a consequence of the community quarantines imposed during the COVID-19 pandemic in March 2020. It was briefly reopened in late 2021 before it underwent a year-long renovation work again from February 2022 to February 2023 due to the deteriorated athletic oval.

== Facilities ==
The Joaquin F. Enriquez Memorial Sports Complex's main grandstand has a seating capacity of 10,000. It also has an artificial pitch for football use, four tennis courts, and a swimming area.

== Sports events ==
The stadium hosted the following sporting events:

- 1992 Palarong Pambansa
- 1993 PRISAA National Games
- 2005 PRISAA National Games
- 2007 PASUC-National Sports Olympics
- 2008 PRISAA National Games Championship
- 2011 PRISAA National Games
- 2011 Philippine Youth Games – Mindanao Qualifying Leg
- 2023 PRISAA National Games

== Gallery ==
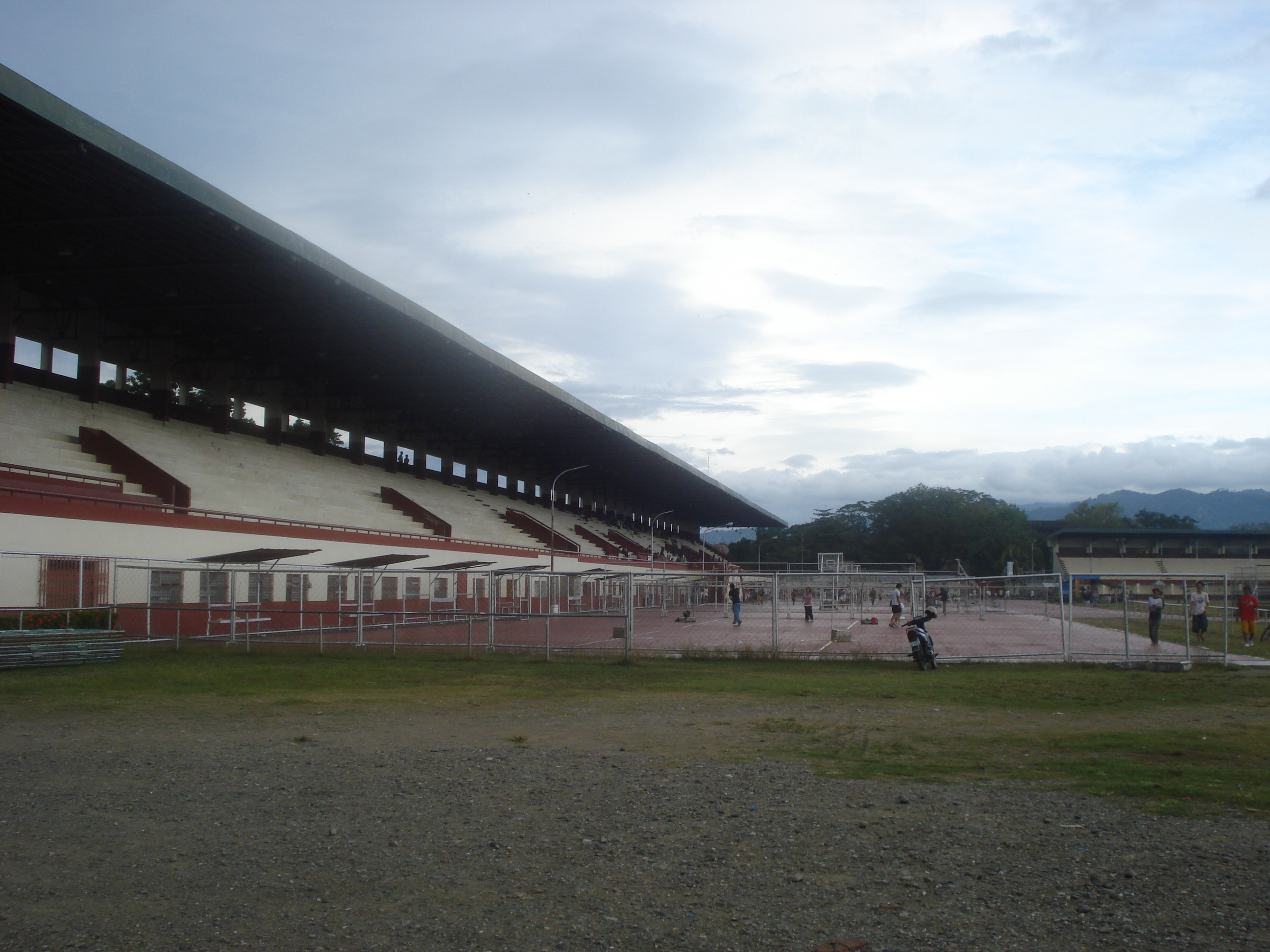
The stadium in 2010

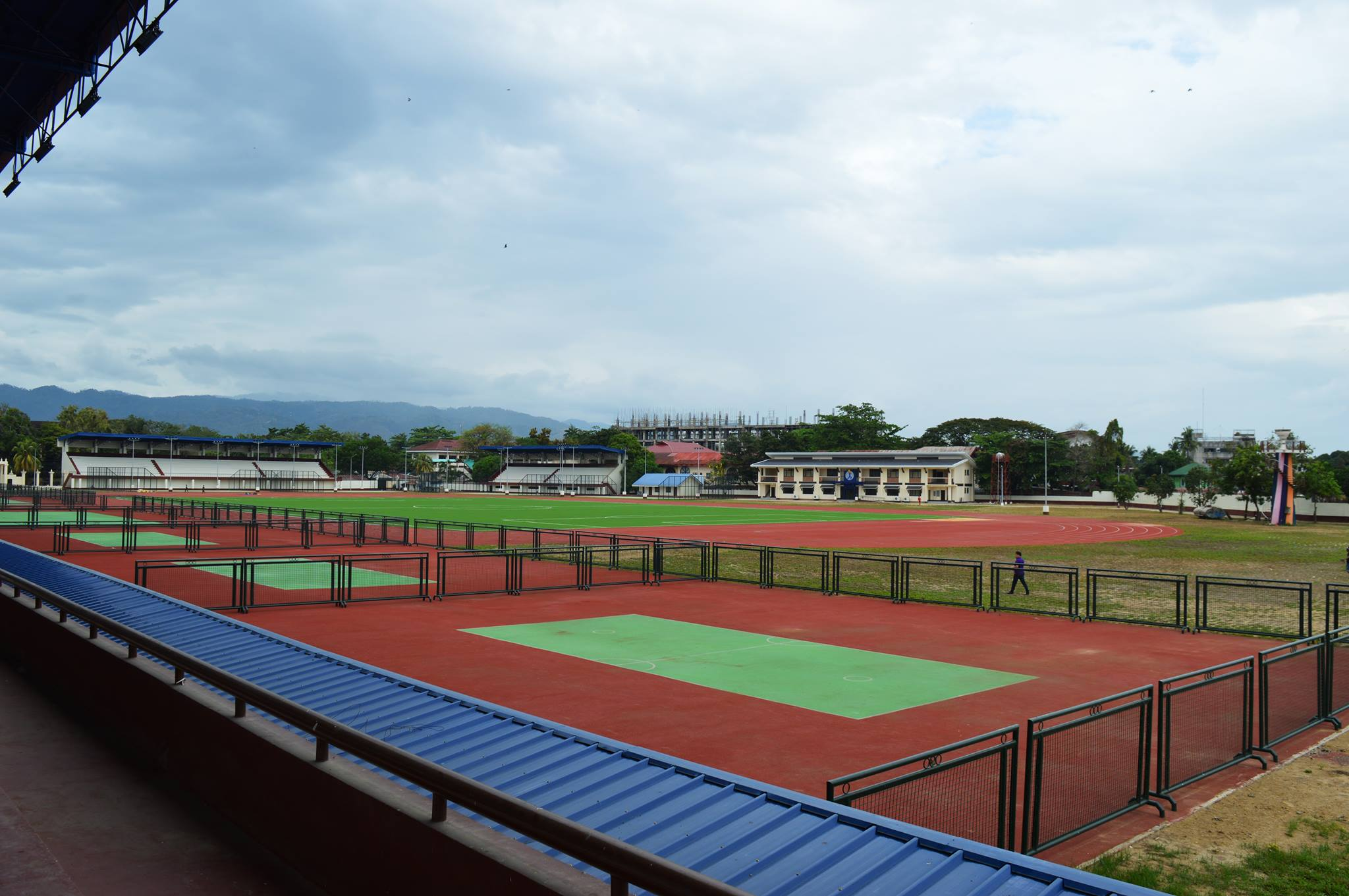
Badminton Court and Stadium Area

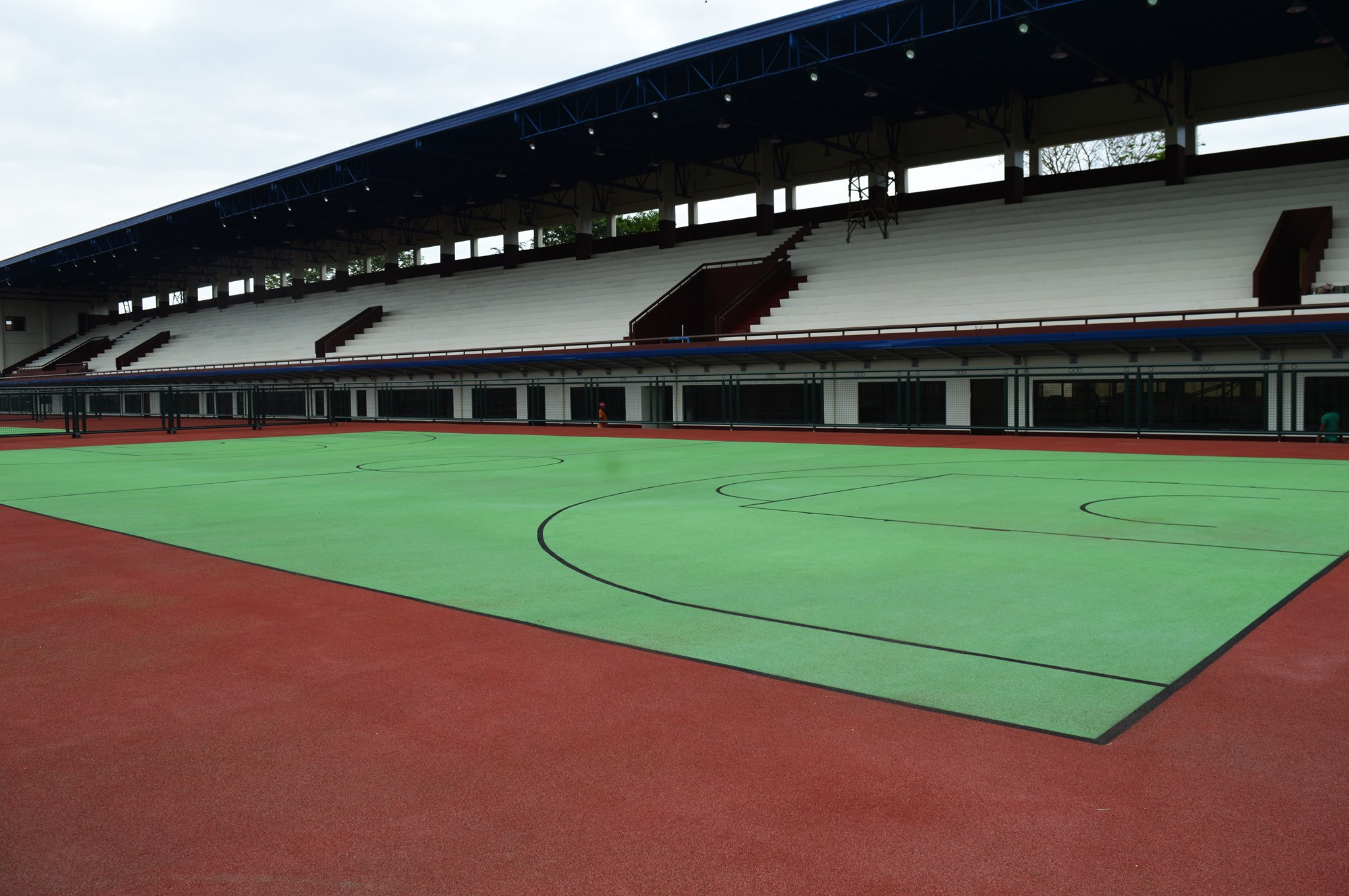
Basketball Court

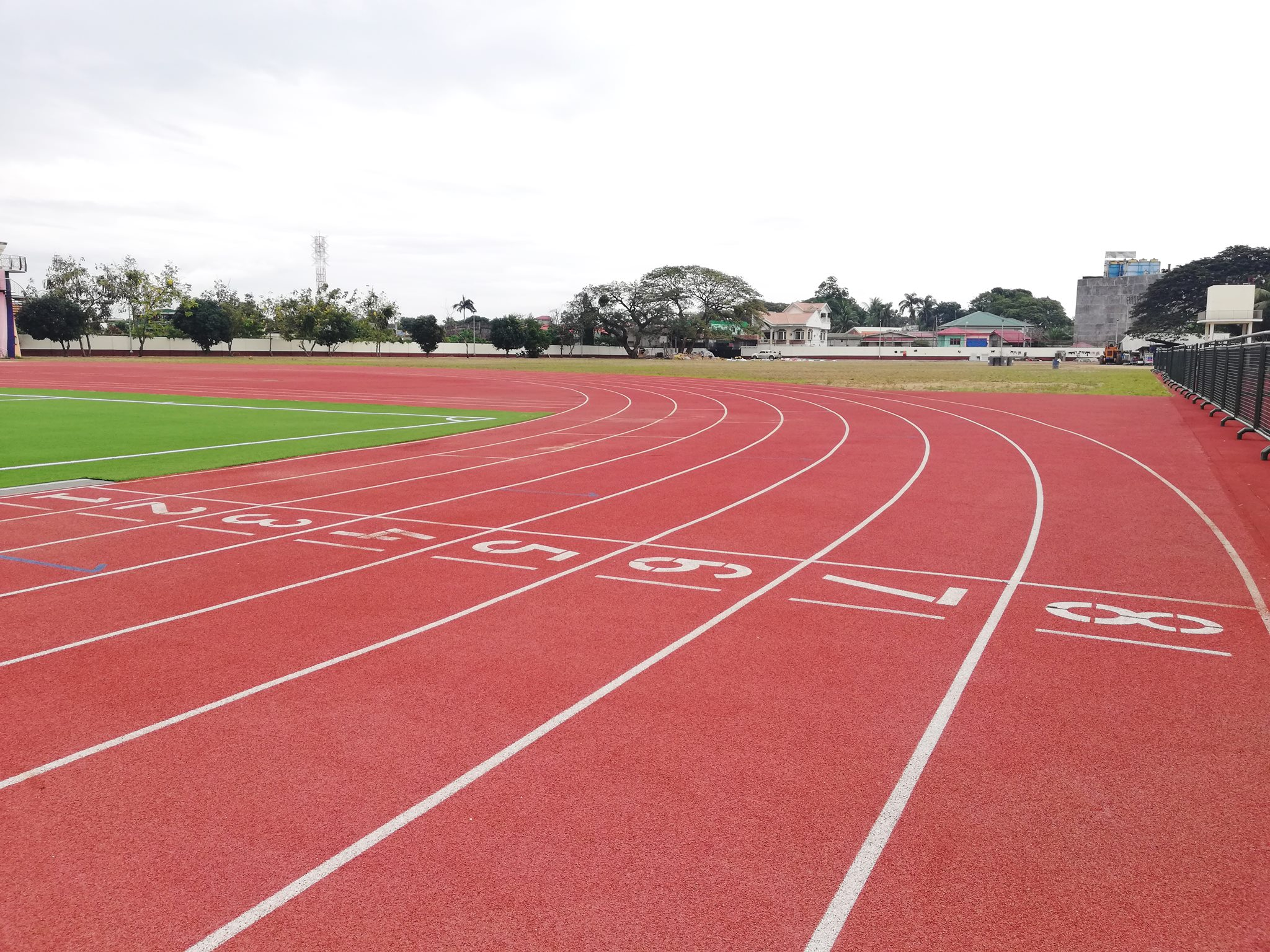
Football Field and Track Oval
