= Villareal Stadium =

Sports complex in Roxas, Philippines

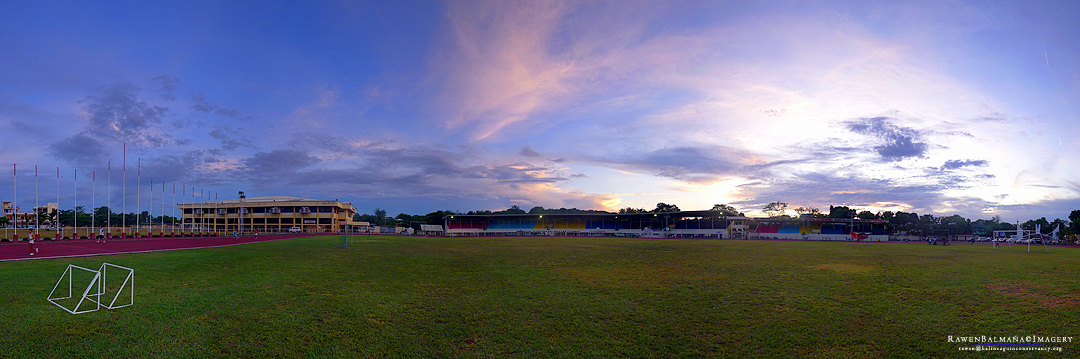
- The Villareal Stadium in 2012
- Interactive map of Villareal Stadium
- Location: Roxas, Capiz, Philippines
- Coordinates: 11°34′30″N 122°45′29″E
- Capacity: 6,000 (gymnasium)

The Villareal Stadium is a sports complex in Roxas, Capiz, Philippines.The sports venue has a rubberized track oval, open paved basketball, volleyball and tennis courts, an Olympic size swimming pool and a 6,000 capacity air-conditioned gymnasium with a basketball court known as the Capiz Gymnasium. The stadium also hosts a football field.

It was named after Cornelio Villareal, of Mambusao, Capiz who served as Speaker of the House of Representatives from 1962-1967 and again from 1971-1972.
