= Amoranto Sports Complex =

Sports complex in Quezon City, Philippines

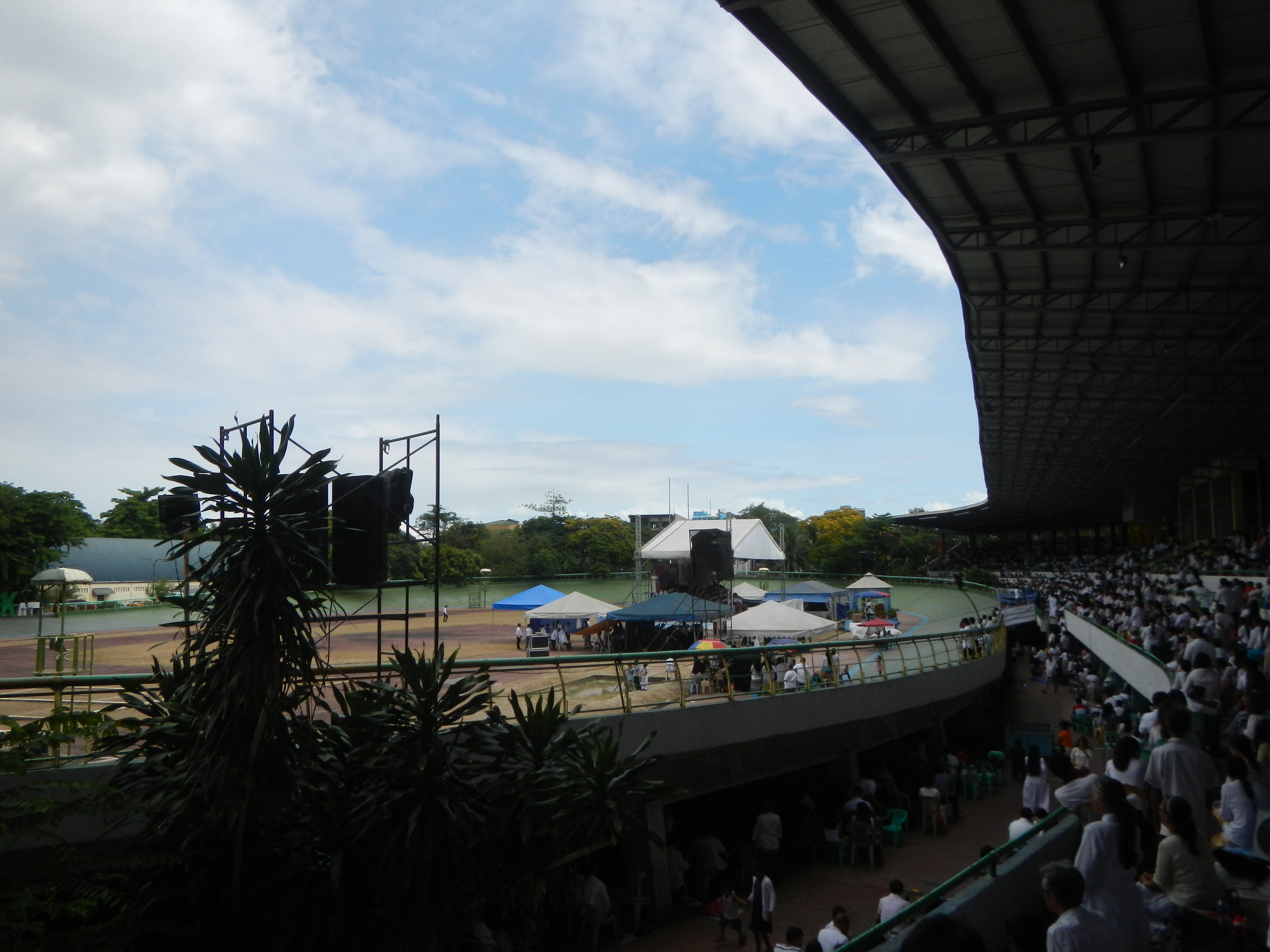
- Amoranto Stadium in 2016
- Interactive map of Amoranto Sports Complex
- Address: Don A. Roces Ave, Diliman, Quezon City, Metro Manila, Philippines
- Coordinates: 14°37′47.6″N 121°01′23.8″E
- Main venue: Amoranto Stadium; Capacity: 15,000
- Facilities: Amoranto Arena; Amoranto Swimming Pool; Amoranto Indoor Sports Facility

Construction
- Opened: 1966
- Renovated: 2005, 2022
- Cost: ₱2 million

Tenant
- Quezon City Galeries Taipan (MPBL) (2024)

The Amoranto Sports Complex is a compound of sports venues located in Quezon City, Philippines.

== History ==
The Amoranto Sports Complex was inaugurated in 1966 by then President Ferdinand Marcos. The facility was constructed at the cost of ₱2 million on a government owned site on Roces Avenue. The facility then consisted of a grandstand, an eight lane track and field oval, bleachers and a gymnasium.

A velodrome was built for the 1981 SEA Games by the Gintong Alay organization.

Prior to the 1991 SEA Games, the Quezon City government attempted to sell the sports complex. A group of Chinese investors planned to convert it into a shopping center but aborted its purchase upon learning about the legal dispute involving the Philippine Sports Commission and the Quezon City government over the sports complex at that time.

The multi-purpose gymnasium was inaugurated in December 2003. The velodrome was renovated ahead of the 2005 SEA Games.

The sports complex fell into disuse in the 2010s with its last competition being the 2013 POC-PSC Philippine National Games. Filipino national cyclists resided inside the complex until 2017 but seldom used the complex's dilapidated velodrome. There are plans to renovate the venue since 2016. The velodrome's specification has fallen behind international standards and it was proposed that a new velodrome be built. But the plan was scrapped with Quezon City agreeing to donate funds to build a velodrome elsewhere.

In 2022, renovation plans for the sports complex was publicized. It includes the construction of the 3,500-seater Amoranto Arena, and a 10-lane Olympic-size swimming pool. It also includes the implementation of a tennis area for the Amoranto Indoor Sports Facility. In January 2023, the venue was declared fit to host international tournaments.

The velodrome was demolished in 2024. In January 2025, groundbreaking for a new athletics oval and football pitch was conducted. The football pitch was inaugurated on February 7, 2026.

== Facilities ==
The Amoranto Sports Complex covers land measuring about 5.8 hectares (14 acres). The main stadium has a capacity of 15,000. The sports facility was named after former Quezon City Mayor Norberto Amoranto.

Several renovations have been done on the Amoranto Sports Complex since its opening. Currently, the sports facility features a tennis court, six badminton courts, a martial arts facility, as well as a multipurpose gym, and a separate gym dedicated to boxing and weightlifting.

It also has a swimming pool with 480-seat bleachers.

The Amoranto Sports Complex also hosts a library for students.

The complex's former velodrome hosted the cycling events for the 2005 Southeast Asian Games. It was demolished and replaced by a football pitch. The Tagaytay CT Velodrome was opened in 2025 in Tagaytay as the cycling venue's replacement.

Venue	Purpose	Seating capacity	Year built	Notes
Amoranto Stadium (Football Pitch, Track and Field Oval and Grandstand)	Stadium	15,000	–	Hosted a velodrome from 1981–2024
Amoranto Arena	Indoor arena	3,500	2020	4-storeys
Amoranto Swimming Pool	Aquatic sports venue	480	–	
Amoranto Indoor Sports Facility	Gymnasium	–		

=== Gallery ===
Amoranto Arena

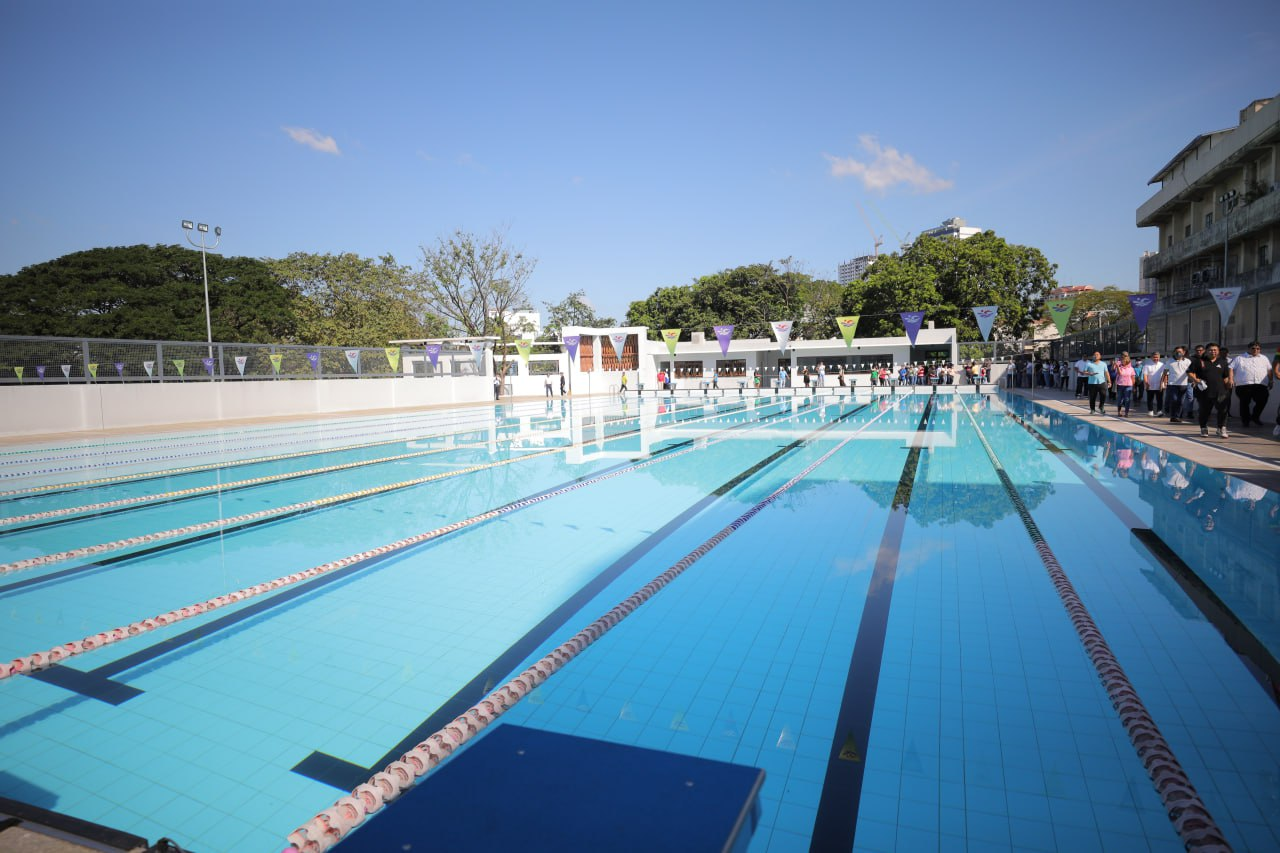
Amoranto Swimming Pool

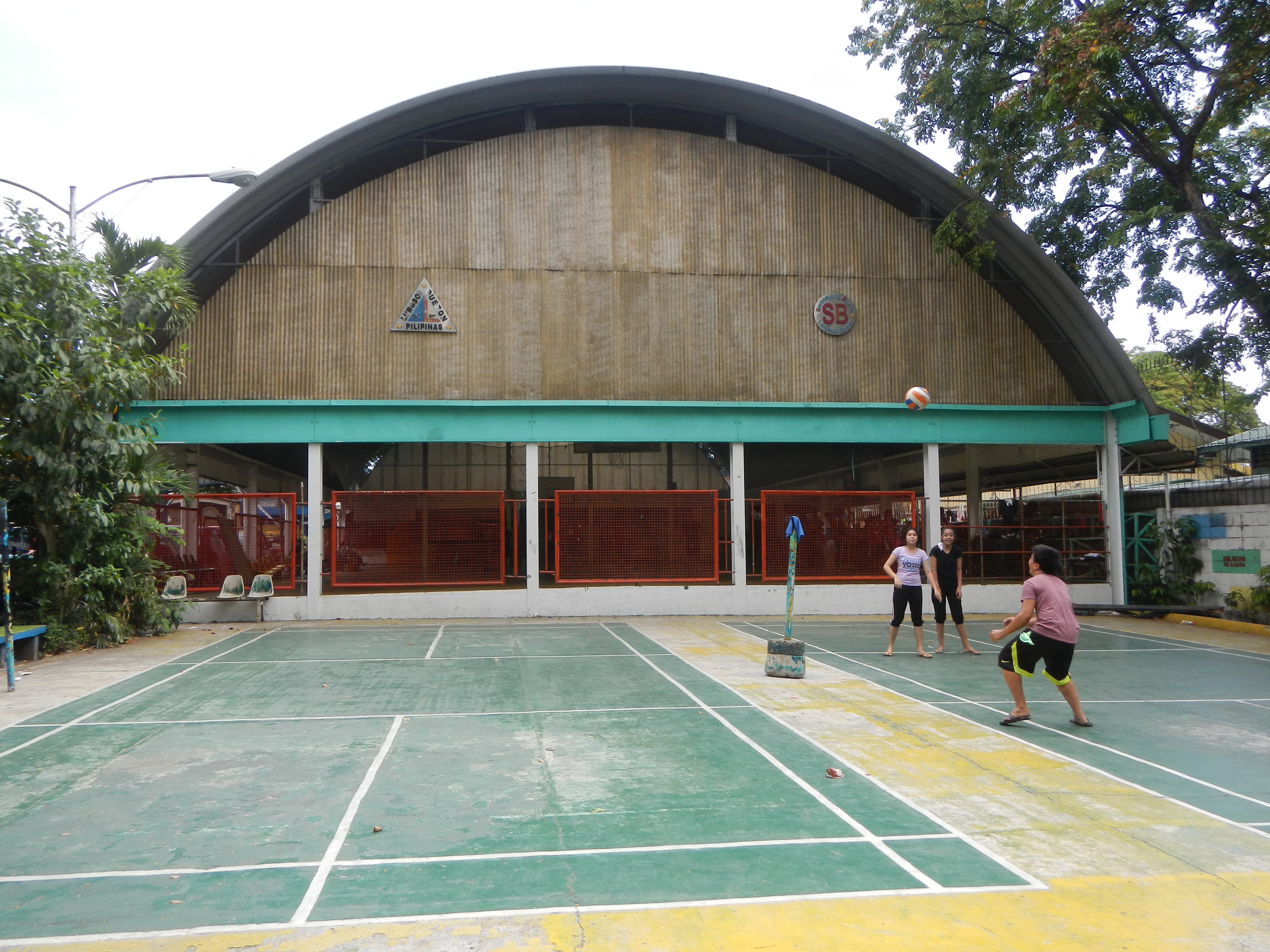
Tennis courts

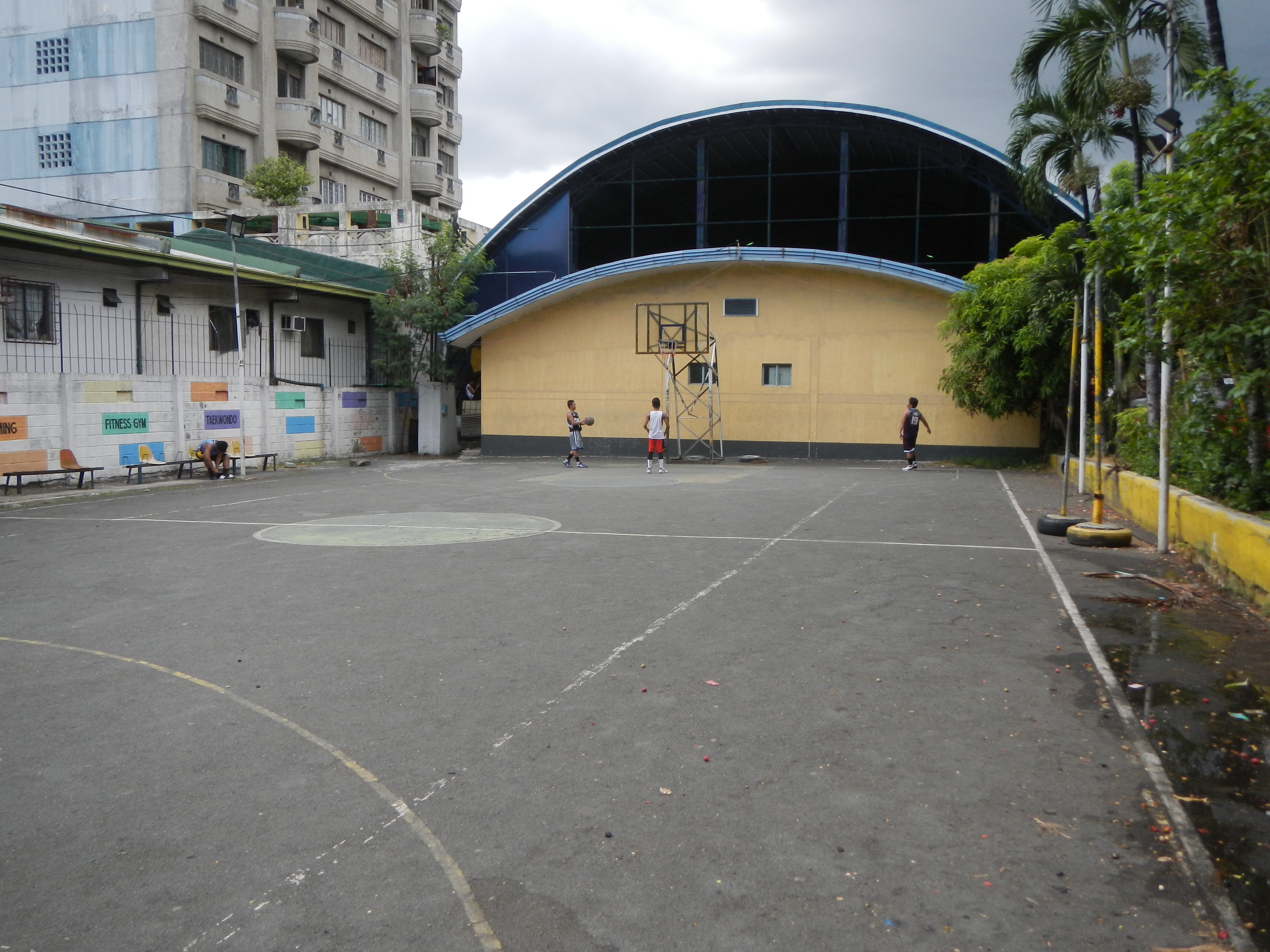
Basketball open court

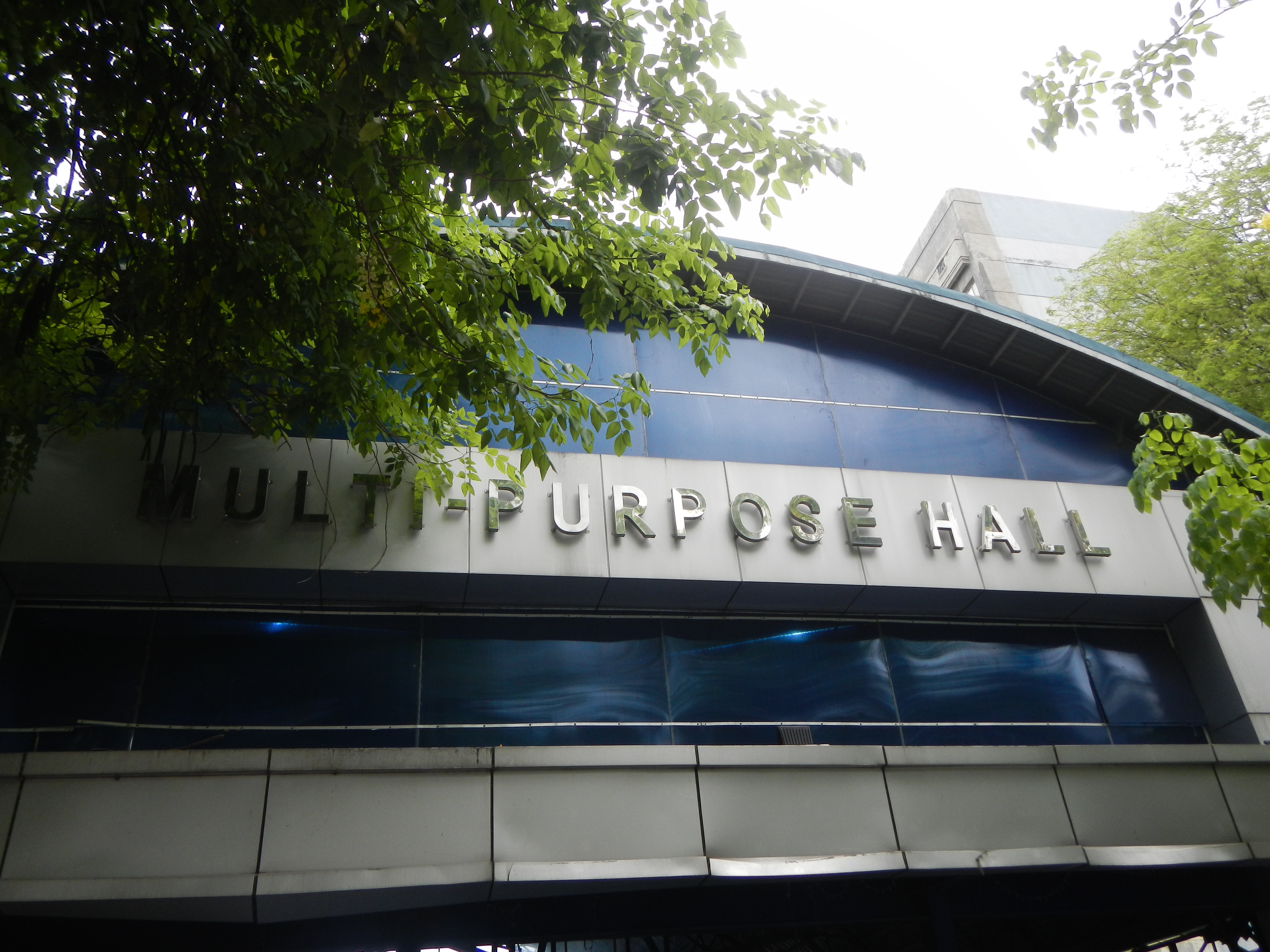
Multi-purpose Hall

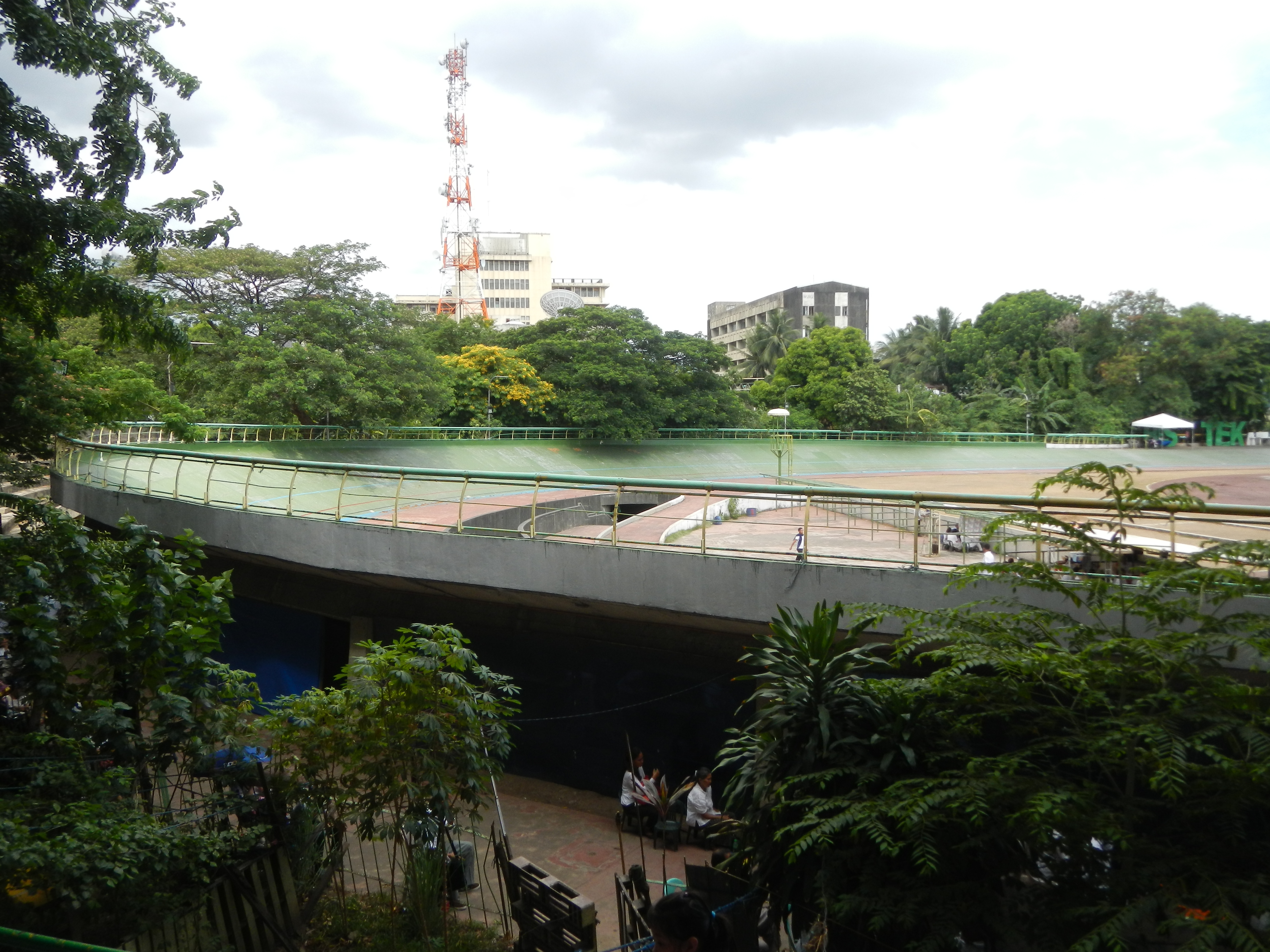
Former velodrome in 2016

== See also ==
- List of cycling tracks and velodromes

Preceded by Blue Eagle Gym; JCSGO Seed Dome	Home of the Quezon City Galeries Taipan; 2024–present	Succeeded by current
