= 2026 Palarong Pambansa =

Multi-sport event

66th Palarong Pambansa
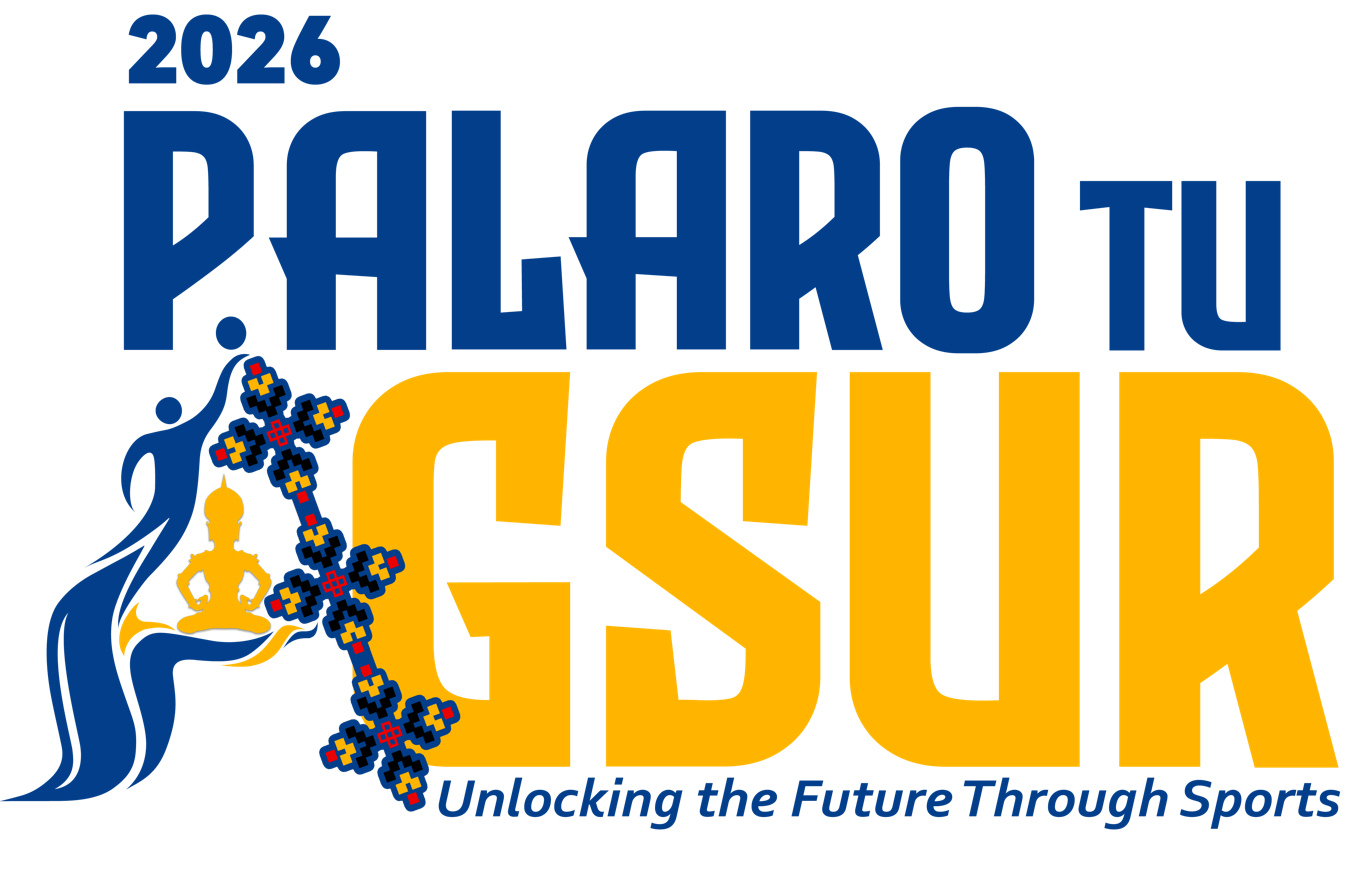
- Palaro in AgSur, official logo
- Host city: Prosperidad, Agusan del Sur (main)
- Country: Philippines
- Motto: Unlocking the Future Through Sports
- Teams: 20 teams (18 regional athletic associations, and two other delegations)
- Athletes: 13,247
- Sport: 35
- Events: 1,470
- Opening: May 24, 2026
- Closing: May 31, 2026
- Opened by: Special Assistant to the President Antonio Lagdameo Jr.
- Closed by: DepEd Secretary Sonny Angara
- Athlete's Oath: Precious Hope Sumile Maghyuis
- Judge's Oath: Hidilyn Diaz
- Torch lighter: Elias Tabac
- Main venue: Patin-ay Sports Complex
- Broadcast partner: People's Television Network Agusan del Sur
- Ceremony venue: Patin-ay Sports Complex
- Website: Palaro tu AgSur 2026

The 2026 Palarong Pambansa, officially known as the 66th Palarong Pambansa, billed as 2026 Palaro Tu Agsur (lit. Palaro in AgSur, stylized in all caps), was a multi-sport event held in Prosperidad, Agusan del Sur from May 24 to 31, 2026. Student-athletes from 20 athletic associations representing the 18 regions of the Philippines, National Academy of Sports, and the Philippine Schools Overseas competed in different sporting events and disciplines.

The National Capital Region was the nineteenth straight general champion.

== Hosting ==
=== Bidding ===
There were 3 bidding provinces in Mindanao: Agusan del Sur, Misamis Occidental and Zamboanga City. Davao City abandoned their bid in April 2024. On July 16, 2024, after the closing ceremony of 64th Palarong Pambansa in Cebu City, Agusan del Sur was declared the winner of the bid, marking the first time that Agusan del Sur will host the games, and also the second time the games will be hosted in the Caraga region since 1970 in Surigao City.

2026 Palarong Pambansa bids
City/Municipality	Province/Region
Prosperidad	Agusan del Sur
Zamboanga City	Zamboanga Peninsula
Oroquieta, Tangub, Ozamiz	Misamis Occidental

Winning bid

== Development and preparations ==
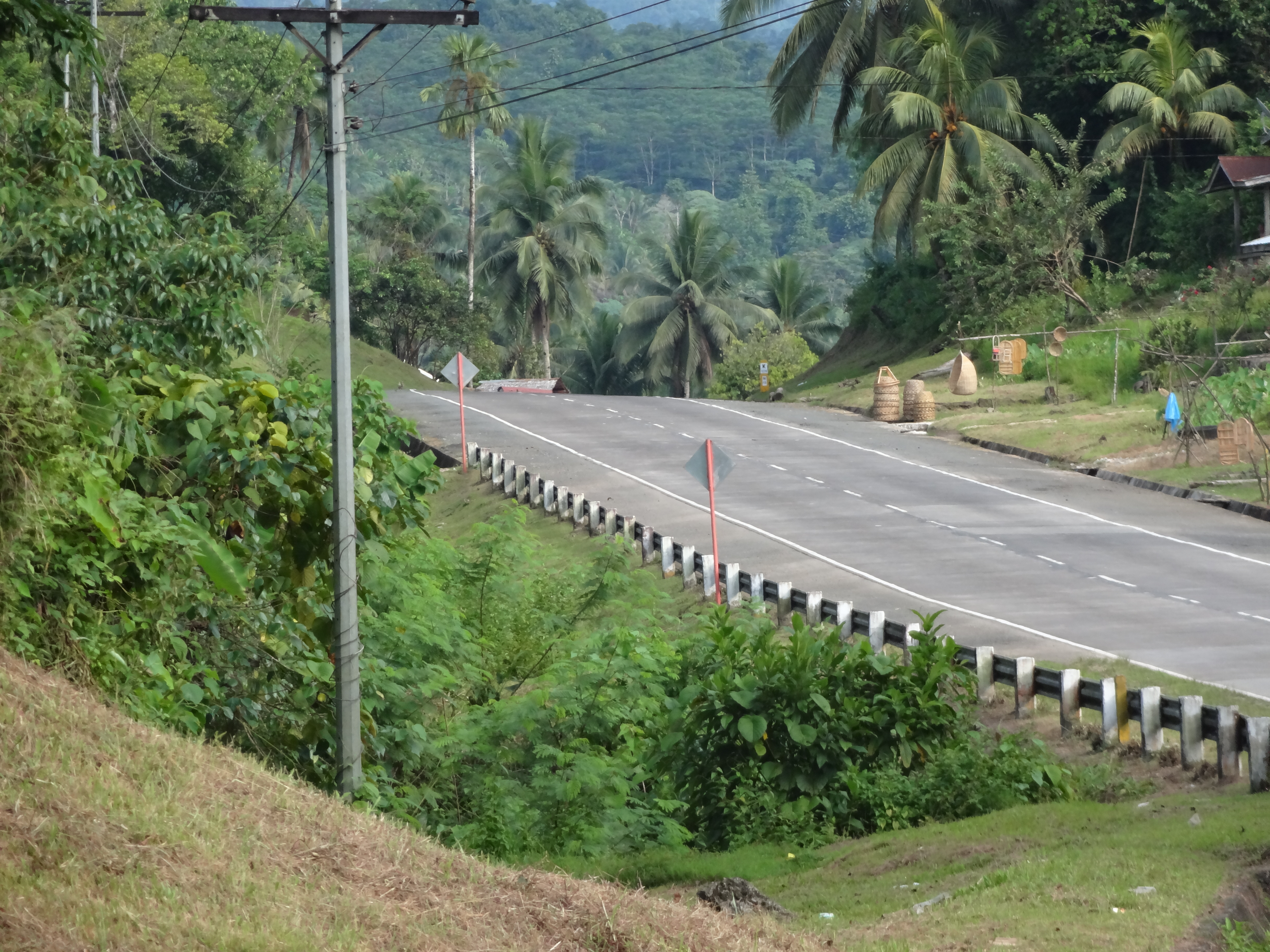
Maharlika Highway in Trento, pictured in 2017, prior to the widening of the highway.

=== Transportation ===
On May 11, the Government of Agusan del Sur rolled out free rides for delegates and spectators during the games, in which the DepEd Secretary Sonny Angara on May 19, thanked the Provincial Government for the free rides and free tourist programs for delegates for the games.

=== Budget ===
The Maharlika Highway in Agusan del Sur is currently under rehabilitation as of March 24, 2026. The rehabilitation efforts cost ₱3.19 billion, including preventive maintenance, road widening, asphalt overlay, street lights, and installation of all road safety measures such as markings and signages. It will be completed before the Palarong Pambansa 2026 starts.

The Datu Lipus Makapandong Democrito O. Plaza Sports Complex cost ₱1.7 billion for construction and rehabilitation. After the games, it will intend to be used not just only for national games, but for any games hosted in that complex.

=== Construction ===
DepEd and Agusan del Sur Provincial Government (PGAS) inspected venues and billeting quarters in Agusan del Sur. Among of those sporting venues were areas designated for volleyball, gymnastics, swimming, and more to accommodate student-athletes and delegation members.

Among these new sites to be constructed at Datu Lipus Makapandong - Democrito O. Plaza Sports Complex were the 2,000 seating capacity EOC Evacuation Center, an additional 2,000 seating capacity second grandstand, a touchpad for the existing swimming pool, a multi-purpose covered courts, a renovated commissary building with modern kitchen facilities and function halls, and a Rhythmic Gymnastics-exclusive gym.

In Bayugan, the ACE Badminton Centre has been constructed for Badminton Tournament for that games, and the Bayugan City Convention Center, in Brgy. Maygatasan, for Taekwondo Tournament.

In Talacogon, the Barangay Del Monte Evacuation Center, with the capacity of 2,000 people for 5x5 Basketball Secondary Girls, has been constructed, and ready to use for that games.

Currently, Agusan del Sur is now 100% ready for the said games.

=== Medals ===
The Palaro 2026 medal features handcrafted ribbons made by the Indigenous People of Loreto.

=== Security ===
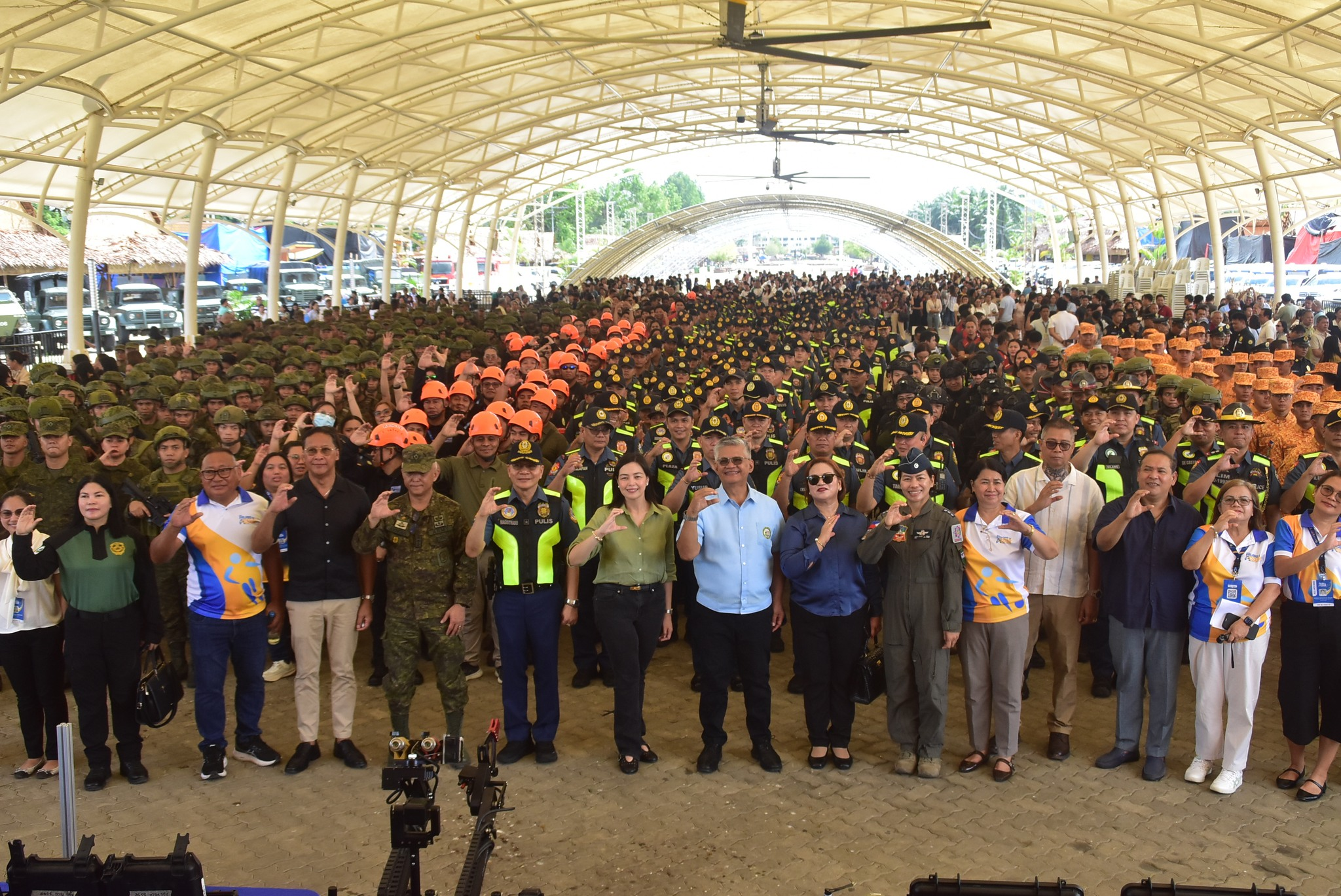
The Government of Agusan del Sur and its uniformed personnel attended the Multi-Agency Task Force at Naliyagan Grounds, Patin-ay, Prosperidad, Agusan del Sur to secure and protect the Palaro athletes.

Security will be handled by the Provincial Government of Agusan del Sur, together with the 916 members of the 401st Infantry Brigade (401st IBde) of the Philippine Army, and 700 police personnel of the Police Regional Office 13 of the Philippine National Police of the estimated of 2,000 multi-agency task force personnel nationwide.

=== Impact on the games due to 2026 Iran war ===
Rumors circulated that the games will be possibly cancelled due to the economic impact of the 2026 Iran war including increasing oil prices and fare hikes as per declared by President Bongbong Marcos on March 24. The organization and its Provincial Government have not yet confirmed this cancellation. To solve this, Marcos signed the Republic Act 12316, known as to temporarily suspend or reduce excise taxes on petroleum products in response to surging global oil prices due to the ongoing conflict in Iran until December 31, 2028.

The National Secretariat of Palarong Pambansa and the Provincial Government of Agusan del Sur clarified that the games will continue as planned.

=== Tickets ===
On May 20, Governor Cane told PTV-8 that he opened all sporting events of the games without any tickets and free to watch, but they're going under security checks for the safety of all spectators during the games.

== Venues ==
Gov. D.O. Plaza Sports Complex, the venue of the opening ceremony of the games

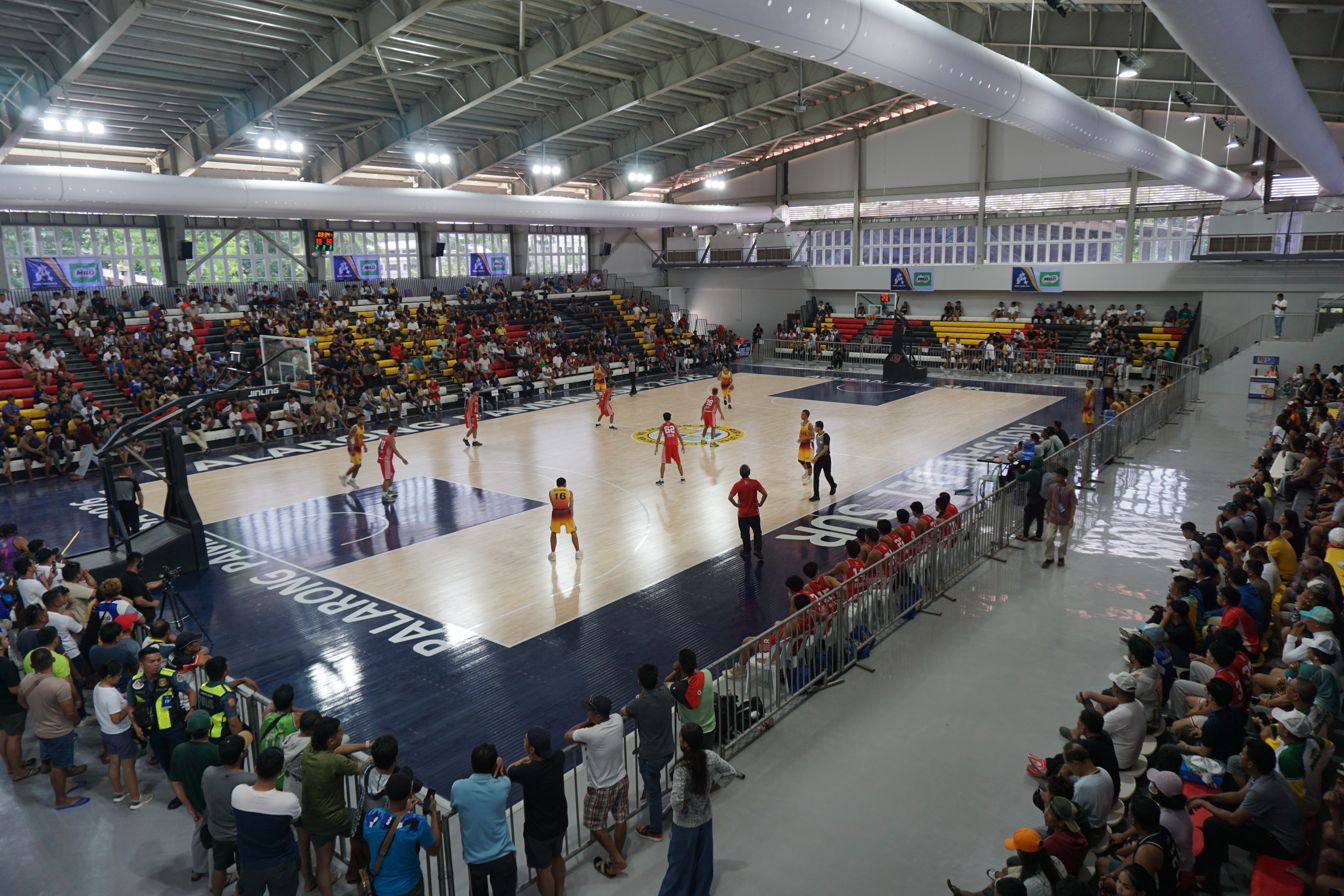
Inside of the EOC Evacuation Center will host the Basketball 5x5 Secondary Boys.

A Caraga Taekwondo Student-Athlete with Bayugan City Convention Center in the background, the host of the games' Taekwondo tournament.

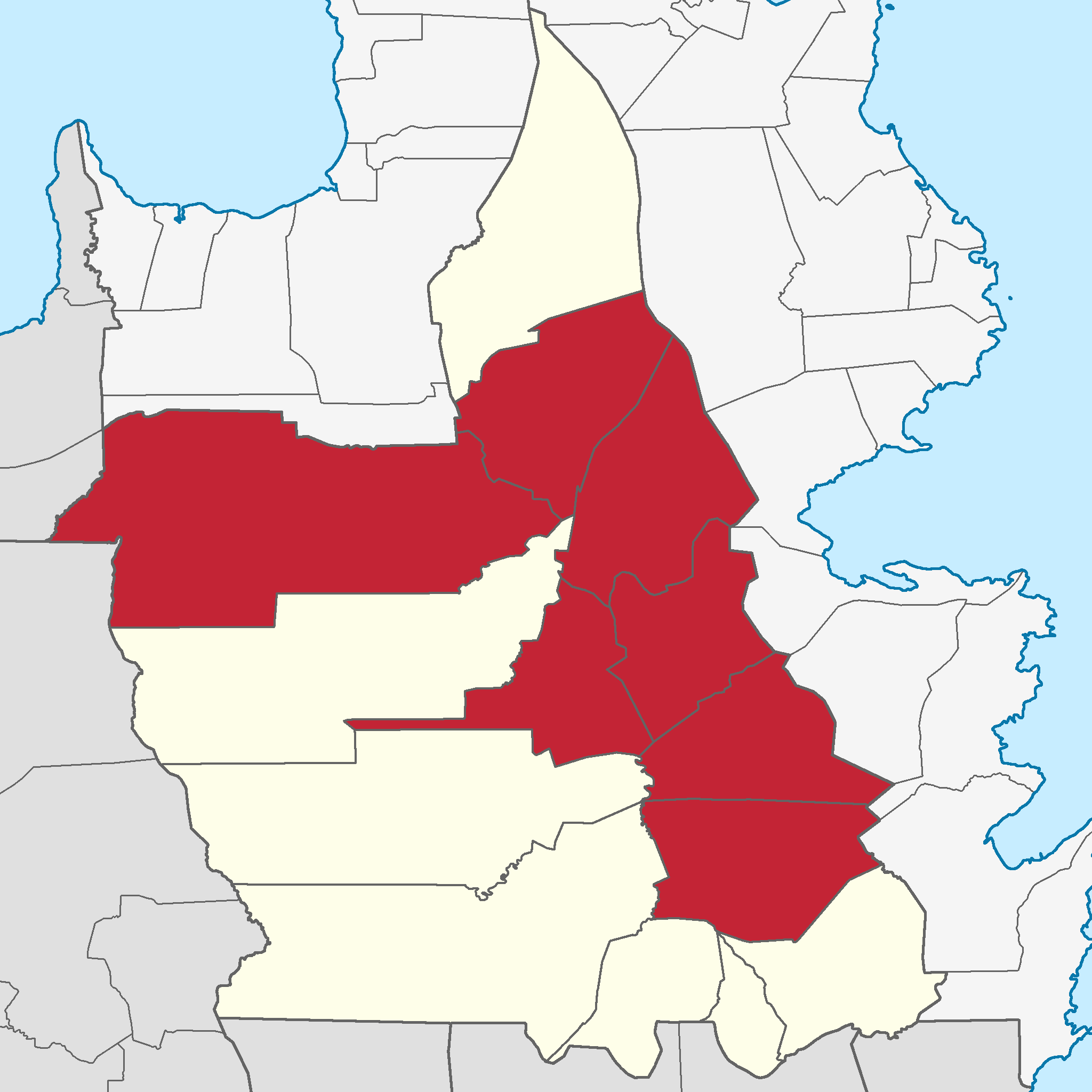
Municipalities that have venues in the 2026 Palarong Pambansa

=== Sporting venues ===
The following are the official playing venues for the games.

Municipality	Venue	Event
Prosperidad	Gov. D.O. Plaza Sports Complex Main Stadium	Athletics Opening Ceremony Football
Prosperidad	Gov. D.O. Plaza Sports Complex Aquatic Center	Swimming
Prosperidad	Gov. D.O. Plaza Sports Complex Multi-purpose Basketball Court	Dancesport Karatedo
Prosperidad	Gov. D.O. Plaza Sports Complex Tennis Court	Tennis Soft Tennis
Prosperidad	Gov. D.O. Plaza Sports Complex Football Field	Football
Prosperidad	Gov. D.O. Plaza Sports Complex Open Field	Football
Prosperidad	Agusan del Sur National Science High School Covered Court	Basketball 3x3
Prosperidad	EOC Evacuation Center	Basketball 5x5 Secondary Boys Volleyball
Prosperidad	D.O. Plaza Government Center Provincial Engineering Office Compound	Billiards Volleyball
Prosperidad	ASSAT Compound	Football Sepak Takraw
Prosperidad	Gov. D.O. Plaza Sports Complex Gymnastics Gym (Back of 2nd Grandstand)	Rhythmic Gymnastics
Prosperidad	Naliyagan Open Field	Softball
Prosperidad	D.O. Plaza Government Center (Back of the Provincial Satellite Auditing Office)	Softball
Prosperidad	Gov. D.O. Plaza Tennis Court	Tennis
Prosperidad	D.O. Plaza Government Center Provincial Evacuation Center	Weightlifting
Prosperidad	Datu Lipus Makapandong Cultural Center	Kickboxing
Prosperidad	SURE Covered Court	Table Tennis (Paragames)
Talacogon	Labnig Open Space (now New Talacogon Public Cemetery on June 24)	Archery
Talacogon	Del Monte Evacuation Center	Basketball 5x5 Secondary Girls
Talacogon	Talacogon Municipal Gym	Table Tennis
Bayugan	ACE Sports Centre	Badminton
Bayugan	Kim Lope A. Asis Gymnasium	Basketball 5x5 Elementary
Bayugan	San Lorenzo Ruiz Function Hall	Chess
Bayugan	Bayugan City Convention Center	Taekwondo
Bayugan	Bayugan City Dome	Wrestling
Bayugan	Salvacion Evacuation Center	Wushu
San Francisco	ASELCO Function Hall	Arnis
San Francisco	PERA-MPC Open Field (Temporary venue)	Baseball
San Francisco	San Francisco Municipal Gymnasium	Futsal
San Francisco	Alegria Covered Court	Futsal
Esperanza	Deo Manpatilan, Jr. Datu Mancumbate Cultural Arts Centre	Boxing Muay Thai
Rosario	Eutiqio O. Bade Sr. Sports and Cultural Center	Pencak Silat
Bunawan	ASSCAT Socio-Cultural Gym	Gymnastics

== The Games ==
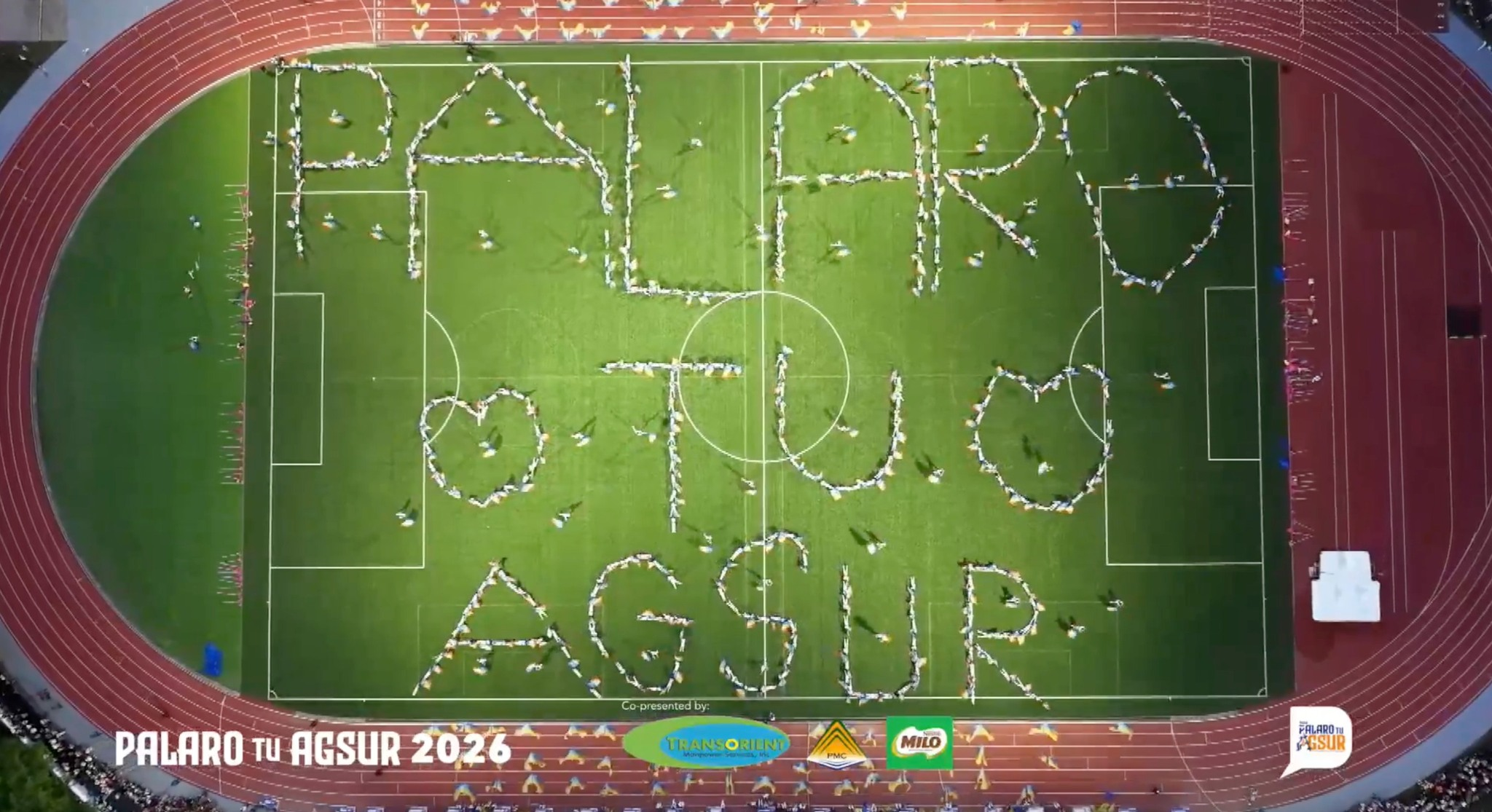
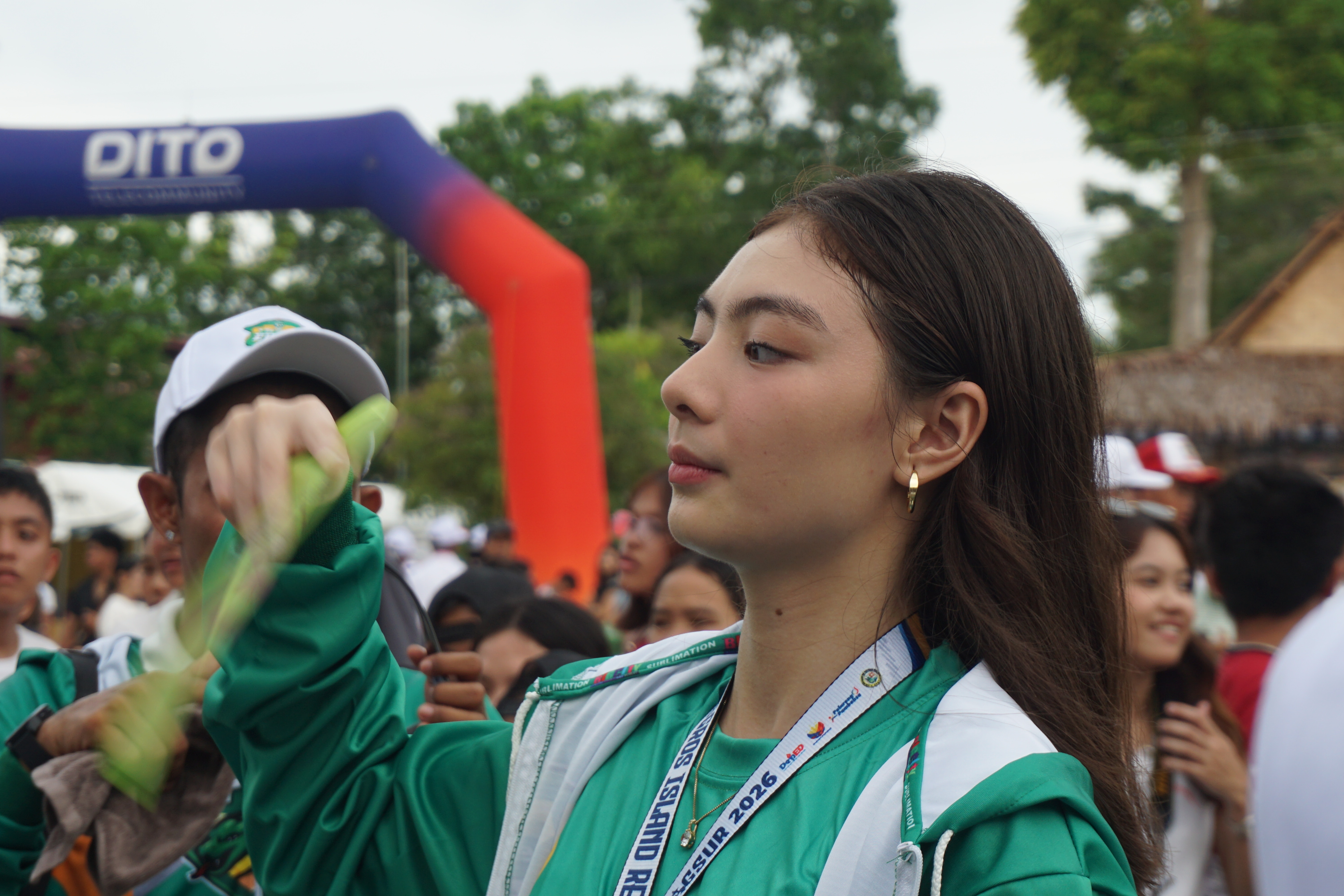
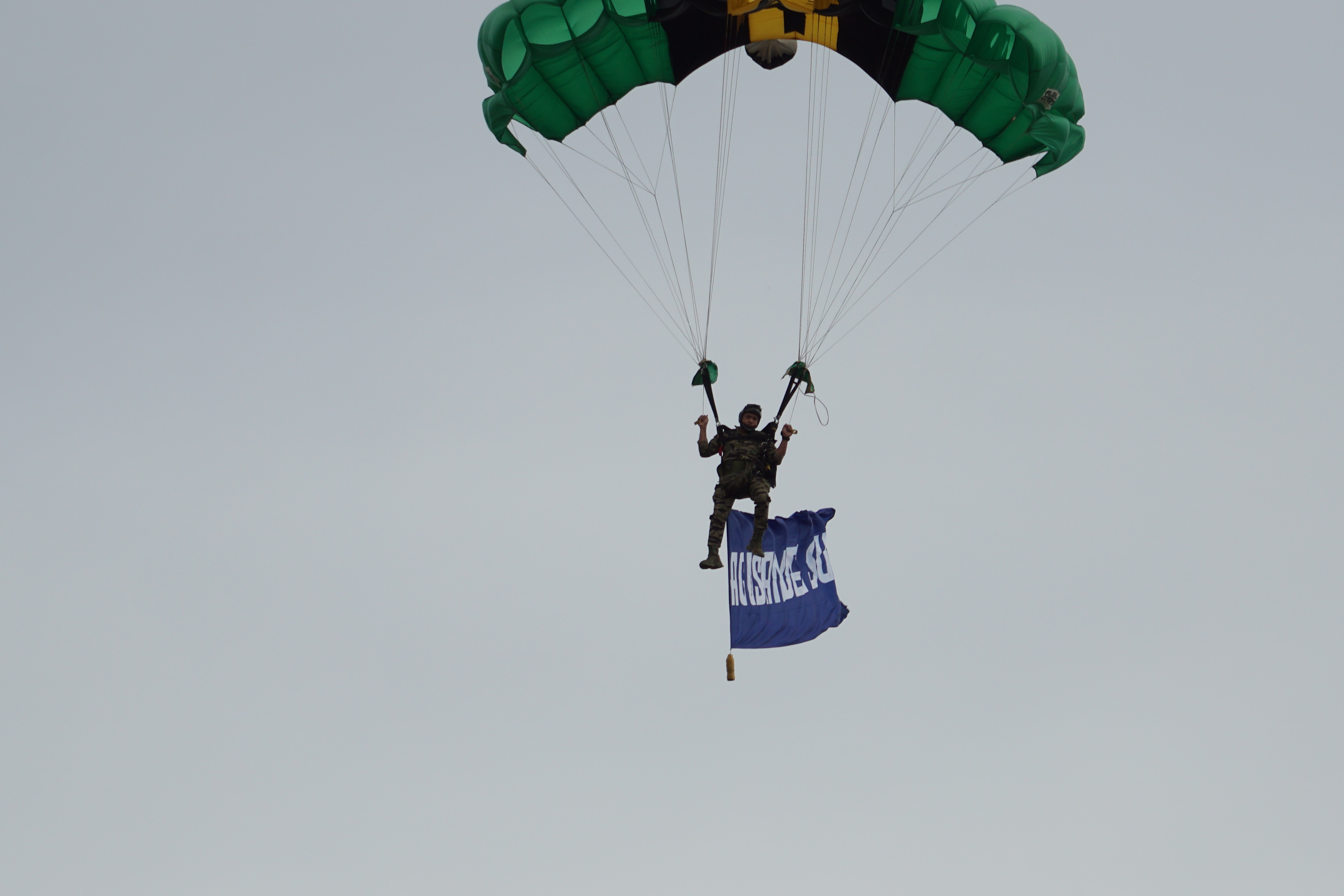
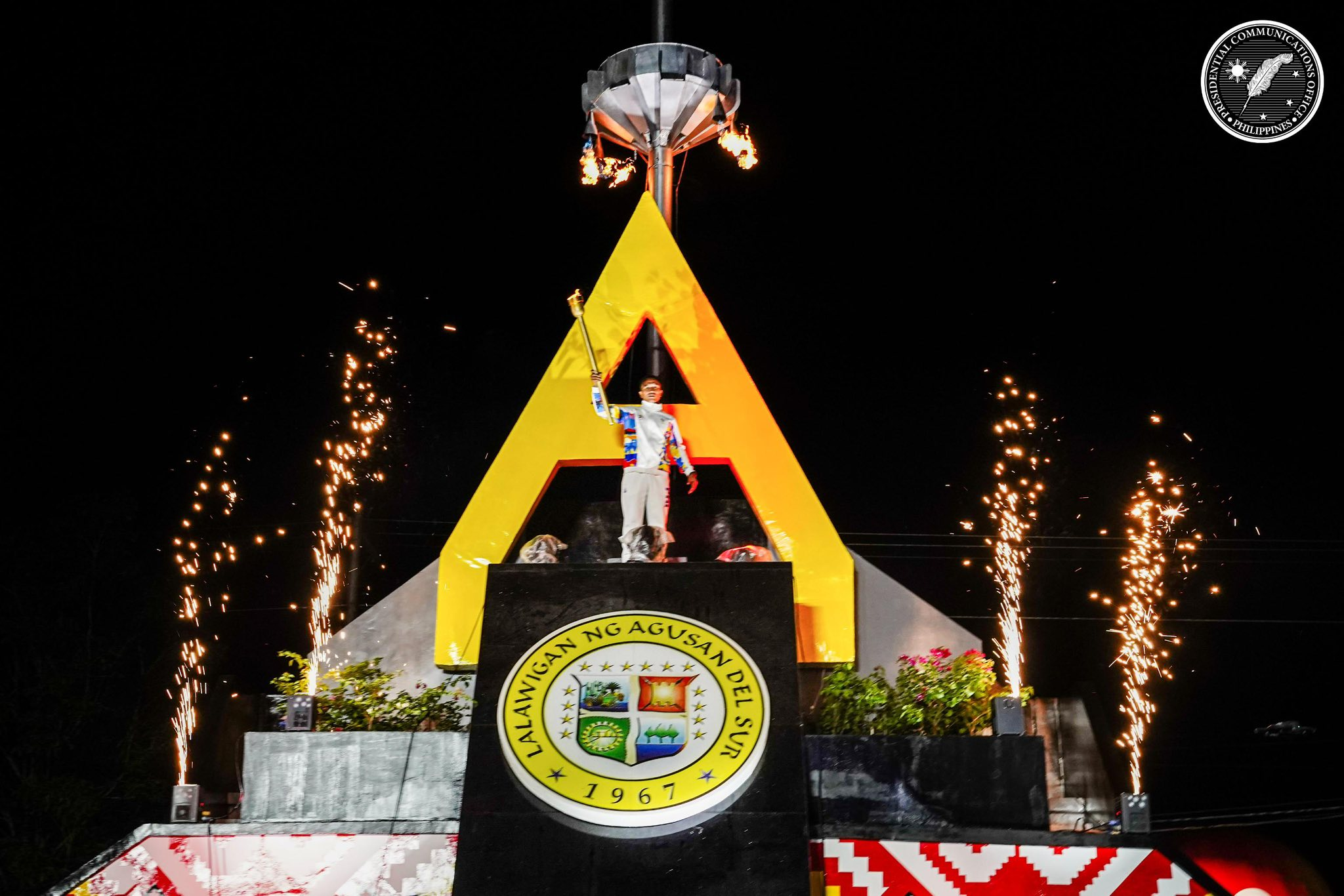
From top, left to right:
- Drone shot of the Patin-ay Sports Complex
- NIR athlete before the saludo
- Philippine Army Parachuter
- 7-time Guinness World Records title holder Elias Tabac, after lighting the torch during the opening ceremony of the games

=== Opening ceremony ===
The soft opening ceremony of the games will be first held at the Narra Avenue, Bayugan on May 23, 2026. The part one of the program will be held at Bayugan City Park and features a Parade & Presentation of Participating Delegations, Opening Ceremonies, and a spectacular Opening Salvo featuring a Cultural & Pyromusical Show, while part two will be held at Bayugan City Convention Center that features a welcome dinner and "Flavors of Bayugan: A Culinary Showcase".

Then, the grand opening will be held at Patin-ay Sports Complex in Prosperidad, Agusan del Sur on May 24. At 1:00pm, the regional delegates will be assembled at Naliyagan Grounds.

At 3:00pm, The Philippine Air Force's Black Hawk helicopter flies towards the venue carrying Philippine Army's Parachute team, then they land in the main stadium.

The Grand Opening Salvo and parade of colors has been presented, and the Grand Opening Spectacle features the delegates from Paragames athletes to the host, Caraga Regional Athletic Delegation.

Governor Cane gave a welcome message to all athletes. The oath of sportsmanship was presented by Precious Hope Sumile Maghyuis of Pencak Silat, and the oath of officiating officials to be presented by Hidilyn Diaz.

DepEd Secretary Sonny Angara will be giving his speech on the introduction of keynote speaker. President Bongbong Marcos will give his message via online. Special Assistant to the President Antonio Lagdameo Jr. will give an address and its declaration of the games instead.

And finally, the ceremonial passing of the torch by the Agusan del Sur athletes, when Elias Tabac flames the torch, to be followed by the drone presentation.

The grand opening show featuring BGYO, Bayang Barrios, and Carmelle Collado will be the last to present the opening ceremony.

=== Sports ===
There are a total of 35 sports disciplines, including the para-games, demonstration sports, and exhibition sports.

Dancesport, Pencak Silat, and Weightlifting became regular sports.

Demonstration sports

- Karatedo
- Kickboxing
- Soft Tennis

Exhibition sports

- Arnis
- Muay Thai
- Sitting Volleyball
- Table Tennis

Parasports

- Athletics
- Bocce
- Goalball
- Swimming

Regular sports

- Archery
- Arnis
- Athletics
- Badminton
- Baseball
- Basketball
- Billiards
- Boxing
- Chess
- Dancesport
- Football
- Futsal
- Gymnastics
  - Aerobics
  - Artistic
  - Rhythmic
- Pencak Silat
- Sepak takraw
- Softball
- Swimming
- Table tennis
- Taekwondo
- Tennis
- Volleyball
- Weightlifting
- Wrestling
- Wushu

=== Closing ceremony ===
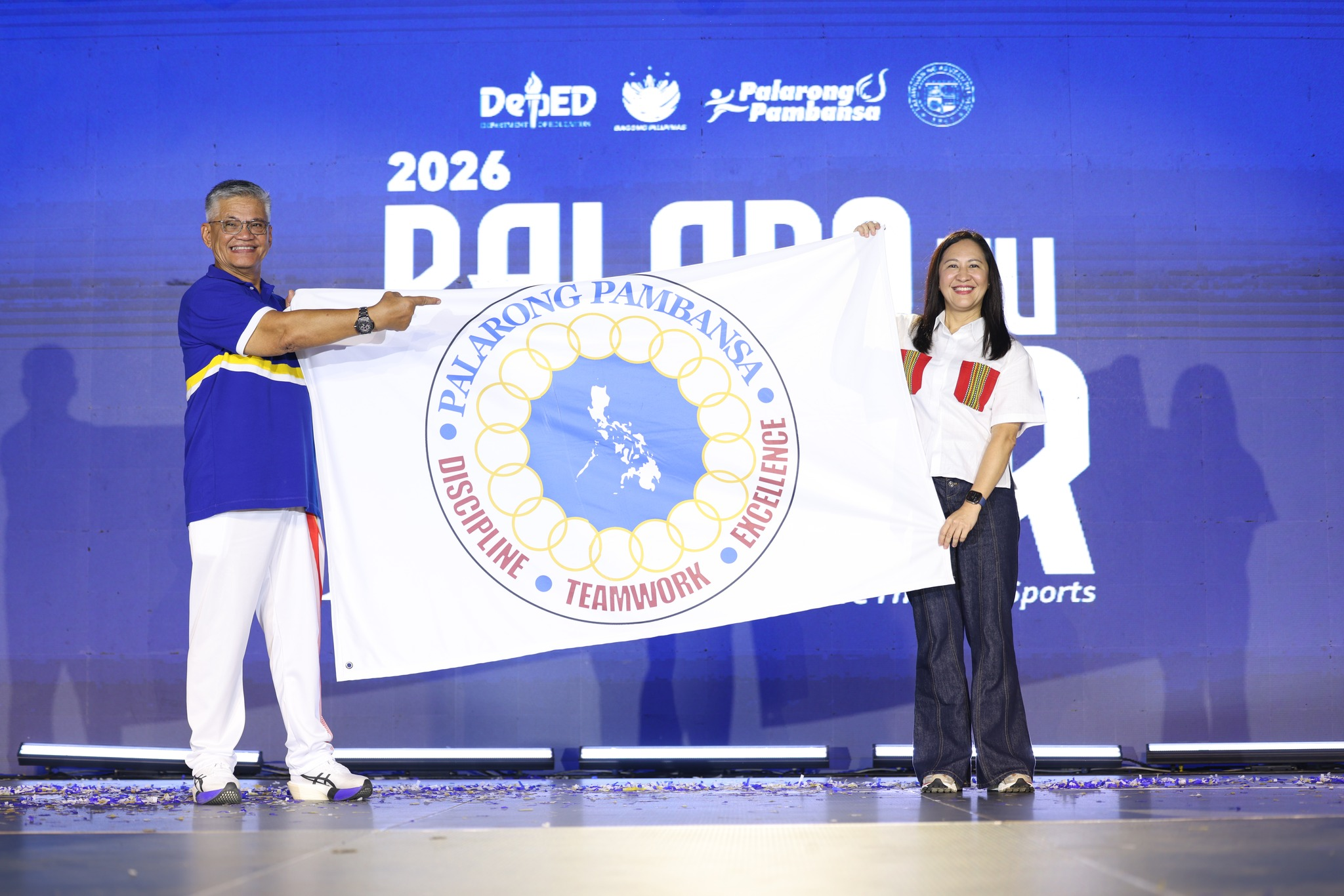
Governor Cane turned-over the games' flag to Mayor Belmonte on May 31.

The closing ceremony was held at Naliyagan Grounds at Patin-ay, Prosperidad, Agusan del Sur on May 31, 2026.

Agusan del Sur Governor Cane hands over the Palarong Pambansa flag to the Mayor of Quezon City, Joy Belmonte.

== Participating teams ==
Host Region

Regions
Code	Name	Colors
BARMM	Bangsamoro	
CARAA	Cordillera	
NCRAA	National Capital Region	
NIRAA	Negros Island	
R1AA	Ilocos	
CAVRAA	Cagayan Valley	
CLRAA	Central Luzon	
STCAA	Calabarzon	
MRAA	Mimaropa	
BRAA	Bicol	
WVRAA	Western Visayas	
CVIRAA	Central Visayas	
EVRAA	Eastern Visayas	
ZPRAA	Zamboanga	
NMRAA	Northern Mindanao	
DAVRAA	Davao	
SRAA	Soccsksargen	
CARAGA	Caraga	
Other teams
Code	Name	Colors
NAS	National Academy of Sports	
PSO	Association of Philippine Schools Overseas	

== Calendar ==
OC	Opening ceremony	●	Event competitions	F/M	Finals/Medal events	CC	Closing ceremony

May 2026	22nd Friday	23rd Saturday	24th Sunday	25th Monday	26th Tuesday	27th Wednesday	28th Thursday	29th Friday	30th Saturday	31st Sunday	Events
Ceremonies			OC							CC	—N/a
Regular, Demonstration^{1}, and Para^{2} Sports
Archery				●	●	●	●	●	●		1
Arnis					●	●	●	●	●		2
Athletics				●	●	●	●	●			5
Badminton				●	●	●	●	●	●		2
Baseball					●	●	●	●	●		1
Basketball		●	●	●	●	●	●	●	●		1
Billiards					●	●	●	●	●		1
Bocce					●	●	●	●			4
Boxing				●	●	●	●	●	●		2
Chess				●	●	●	●	●			1
Dancesport					●	●	●	●			1
Football	●	●	●	●	●	●	●	●	●		1
Futsal					●	●	●	●	●		1
Goalball					●	●	●	●			1
Gymnastics	●	●	●	●	●	●	●	●	●		9
Karatedo					●	●	●	●			1
Kickboxing					●	●	●	●			1
Muay Thai					●	●	●	●			1
Pencak silat					●	●	●	●			4
Sepak takraw					●	●	●	●	●		1
Sitting Volleyball					●	●	●	●	●		1
Softball				●	●	●	●	●	●		1
Soft Tennis				●	●	●	●	●	●		1
Swimming					●	●	●	●			4
Table tennis				●	●	●	●	●	●		3
Taekwondo						●	●	●			6
Tennis		●	●	●	●	●	●	●	●		1
Volleyball				●	●	●	●	●	●		1
Weightlifting					●	●	●	●	●		1
Wrestling				●	●	●	●	●			5
Wushu					●	●	●	●			1

== Medal tally ==
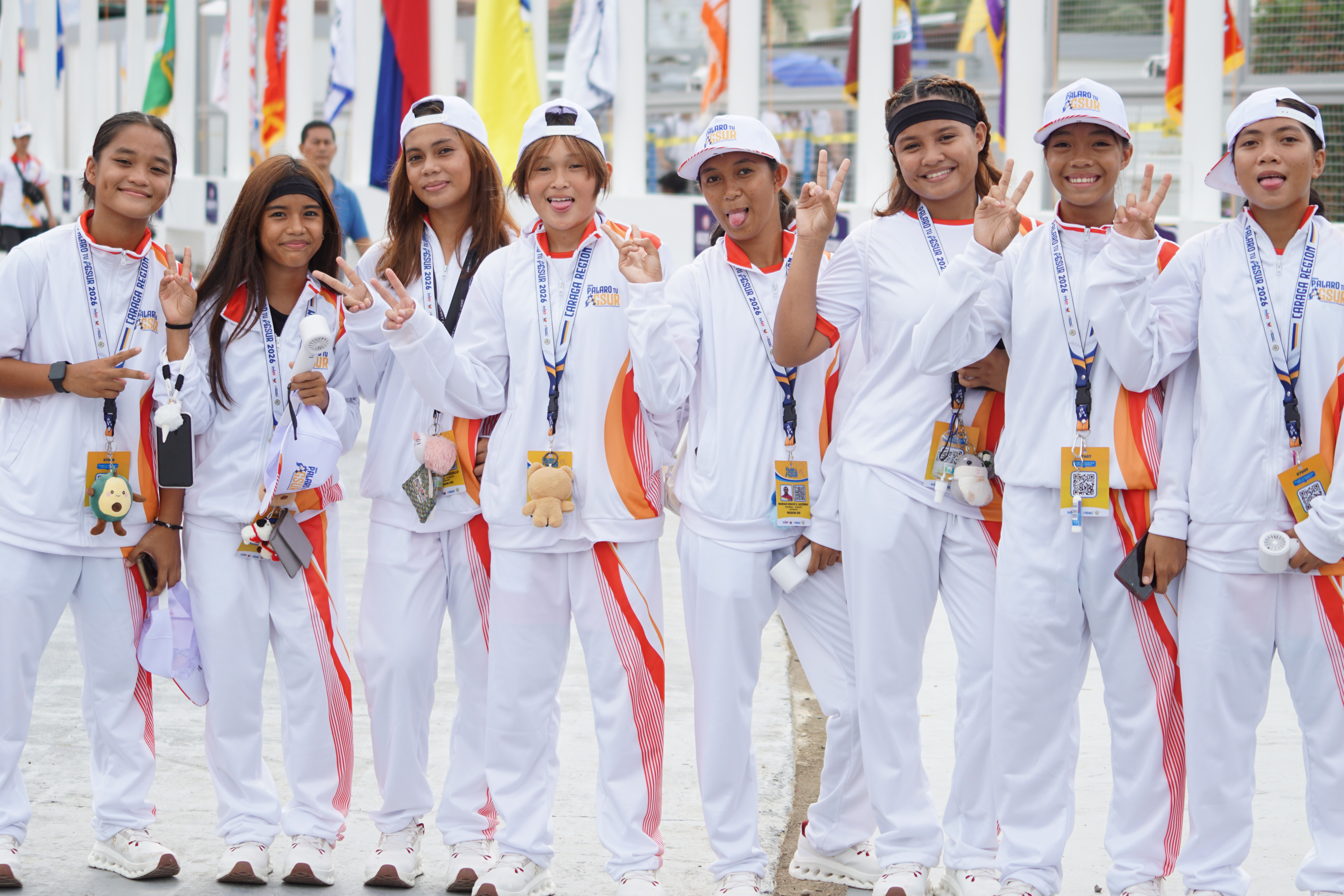
The Caraga Regional Football Athletes during the opening ceremony, in which later become gold medalists of the inaugural Secondary Girls Football tournament on May 30.

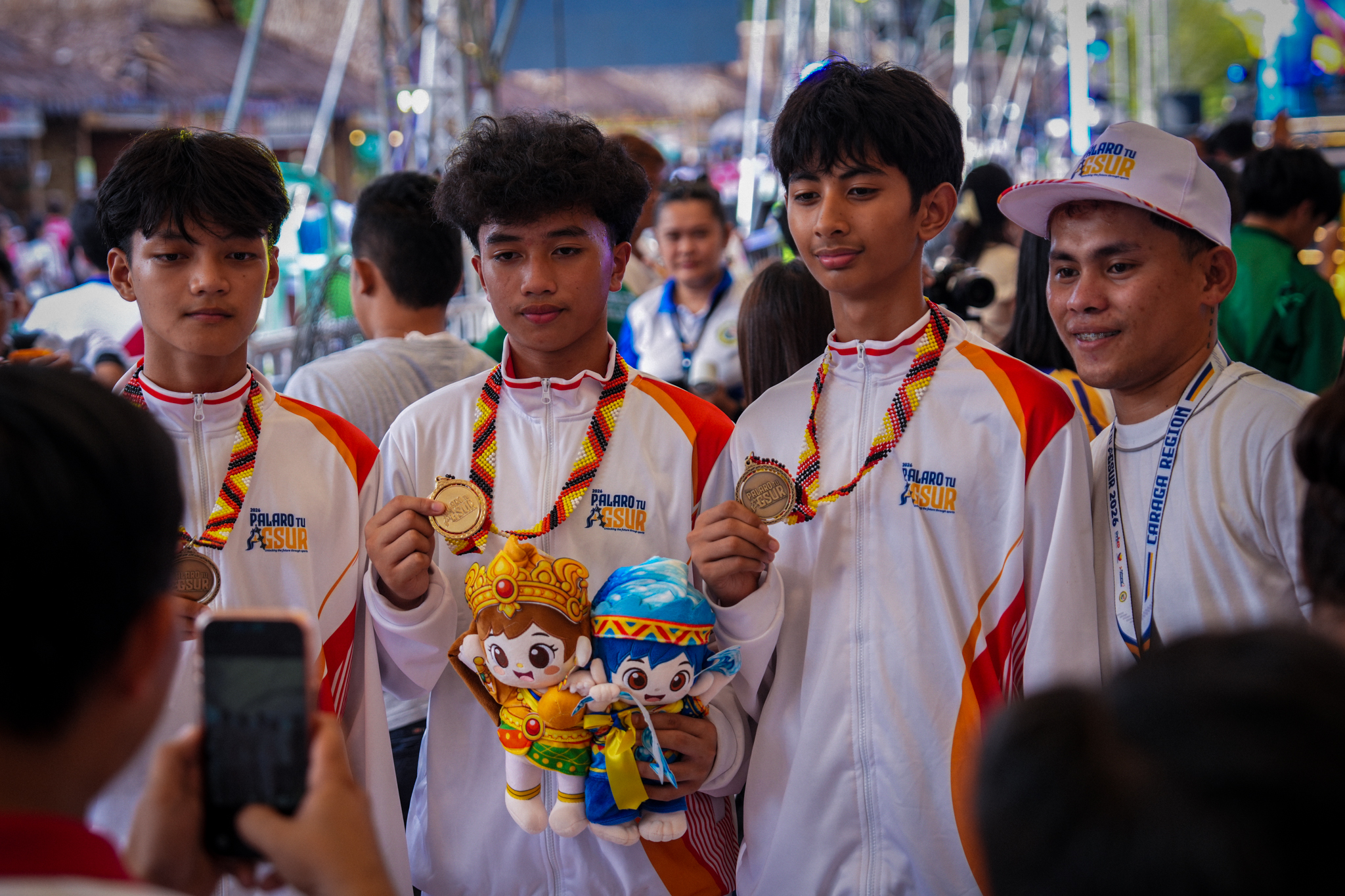
The Caraga Taekwondo Athletes were receive their medals during the awarding ceremony of the games.

=== Regular games ===
Rank	Region	Gold	Silver	Bronze	Total
1	National Capital Region (NCRAA)	91	71	71	233
2	Calabarzon (IV-A STCAA)	55	50	60	165
3	Davao Region (XI-DavRAA)	34	32	34	100
4	Central Visayas (VII-CVIRAA)	32	30	44	106
5	Western Visayas (VI-WVRAA)	31	36	45	112
6	Caraga (CARAGARAA)*	30	19	48	97
7	Northern Mindanao (X-NMRAA)	27	31	31	89
8	Central Luzon (III-CLRAA)	27	27	33	87
9	Soccsksargen (XII-SRAA)	19	25	32	76
10	Zamboanga Peninsula (IX-ZPRAA)	17	11	13	41
11	Negros Island Region (NIRAA)	16	24	29	69
12	Eastern Visayas (VIII-EVRAA)	14	25	26	65
13	Ilocos Region (I-R1AA)	14	18	22	54
14	Bicol Region (V-BRAA)	13	18	21	52
15	Cordillera Administrative Region (CARAA)	13	17	16	46
16	National Academy of Sports (NAS)	11	5	12	28
17	Mimaropa (IV-B MRAA)	5	2	7	14
18	Cagayan Valley (II-CAVRAA)	4	10	18	32
19	Bangsamoro Autonomous Region (BARMAA)	1	2	1	4
20	Philippine Schools Overseas	0	0	0	0
Totals (20 entries)		454	453	563	1,470

Source: palarongpambansa2026.com

=== Demonstration games ===
Rank	Region	Gold	Silver	Bronze	Total
1	Soccsksargen (XII-SRAA)	4	5	9	18
2	Davao Region (XI-DavRAA)	4	4	5	13
3	Caraga (CARAGARAA)*	4	1	6	11
4	Cordillera Administrative Region (CARAA)	3	5	4	12
5	Cagayan Valley (II-CAVRAA)	3	2	4	9
6	National Capital Region (NCRAA)	3	1	1	5
7	Calabarzon (IV-A STCAA)	2	1	2	5
8	Northern Mindanao (X-NMRAA)	1	2	4	7
9	Western Visayas (VI-WVRAA)	1	1	8	10
10	Eastern Visayas (VIII-EVRAA)	1	0	4	5
11	Zamboanga Peninsula (IX-ZPRAA)	1	0	0	1
12	Ilocos Region (I-R1AA)	0	3	0	3
13	Central Luzon (III-CLRAA)	0	1	1	2
13	Central Visayas (VII-CVIRAA)	0	1	1	2
15	Mimaropa (IV-B MRAA)	0	0	3	3
16	Bangsamoro Autonomous Region (BARMAA)	0	0	2	2
17	Bicol Region (V-BRAA)	0	0	0	0
17	National Academy of Sports (NAS)	0	0	0	0
17	Negros Island Region (NIRAA)	0	0	0	0
17	Philippine Schools Overseas	0	0	0	0
Totals (20 entries)		27	27	54	108

Source: palarongpambansa2026.com

=== Para games ===
Rank	Region	Gold	Silver	Bronze	Total
1	Western Visayas (VI-WVRAA)	21	25	15	61
2	Negros Island Region (NIRAA)	15	6	5	26
3	Calabarzon (IV-A STCAA)	12	13	7	32
4	Eastern Visayas (VIII-EVRAA)	11	4	5	20
5	Bicol Region (V-BRAA)	7	7	5	19
6	Davao Region (XI-DavRAA)	6	8	6	20
7	National Capital Region (NCRAA)	6	7	7	20
8	Zamboanga Peninsula (IX-ZPRAA)	5	2	4	11
9	Caraga (CARAGARAA)*	4	9	8	21
10	Northern Mindanao (X-NMRAA)	3	3	1	7
11	Soccsksargen (XII-SRAA)	2	8	9	19
12	Ilocos Region (I-R1AA)	2	1	9	12
13	Central Luzon (III-CLRAA)	2	1	6	9
14	Bangsamoro Autonomous Region (BARMAA)	1	1	4	6
15	Cordillera Administrative Region (CARAA)	1	1	3	5
16	Central Visayas (VII-CVIRAA)	1	1	2	4
17	Cagayan Valley (II-CAVRAA)	0	1	0	1
18	Mimaropa (IV-B MRAA)	0	0	0	0
18	National Academy of Sports (NAS)	0	0	0	0
18	Philippine Schools Overseas	0	0	0	0
Totals (20 entries)		99	98	96	293

Source: palarongpambansa2026.com

== Marketing ==
=== Branding ===
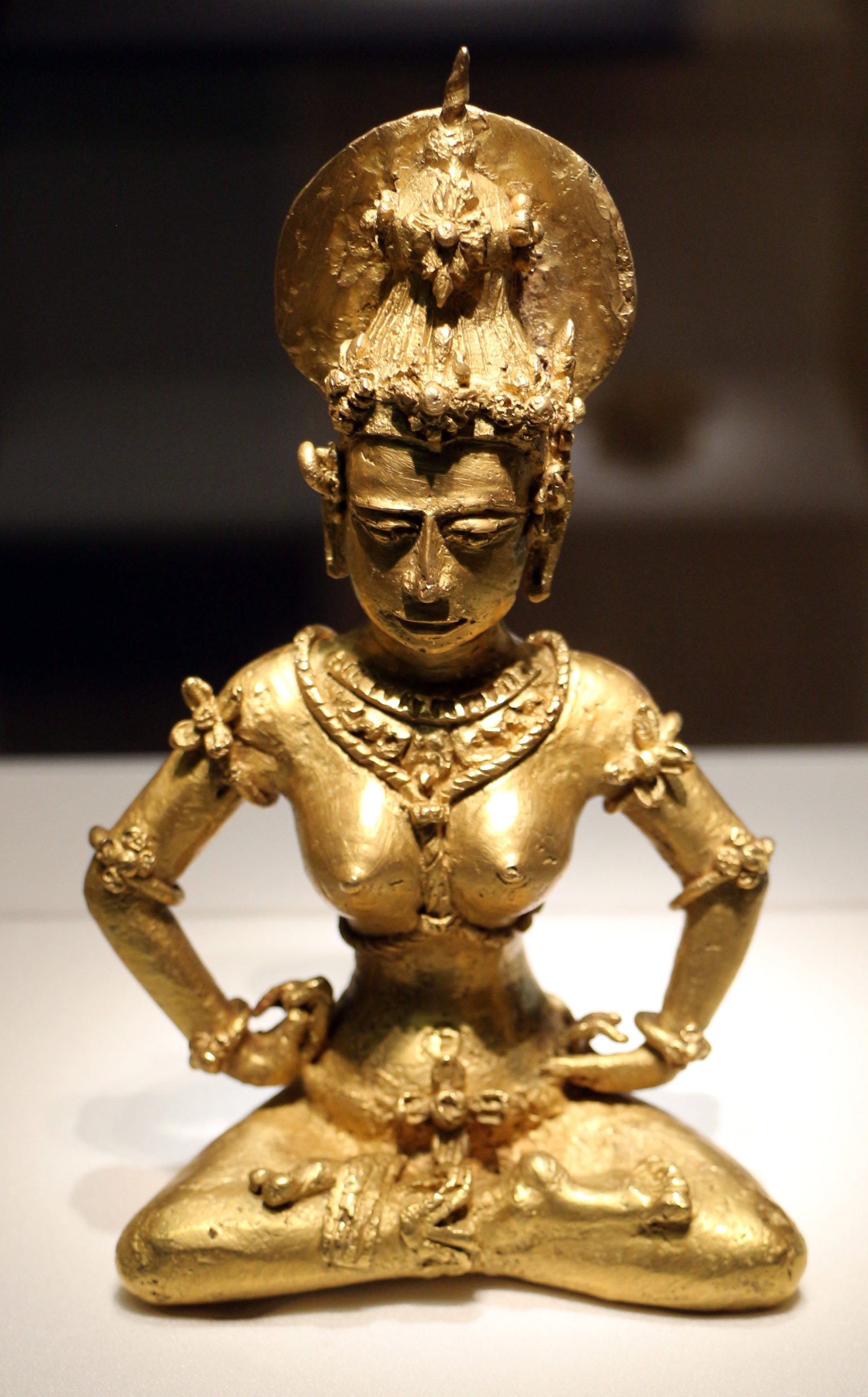
The Agusan image statue (900–950 CE) discovered in 1917 on the banks of the Wawa River near Esperanza, Agusan del Sur, Mindanao in the Philippines, which was the inspiration of the logo.

The logo for the 2026 Palarong Pambansa was unveiled on February 19, 2026, featuring a river representing the Agusan River that stands as a testament to the province's growth and development, the Suyam-inspired element, which was traditionally embroidered by the indigenous people of Agusan del Sur, that stands for the unity and sportsmanship of the games; and the Golden Tara that signifies the colonial heritage of Caraga Region.

=== Merchandise ===
The Government of Agusan del Sur launched the "Tara, Dagan Ta sa Agusan del Sur", a fun run organized by the Team Eddiebong, in partnership with the Provincial Government of Agusan del Sur (PGAS), private sector partners, the Naliyagan Festival Stakeholders Inc. (NSFI), and local running communities, that will serve as a prelude to the 2026 games on May 23, one day before the opening of the games. The winner will receive cash prizes up to P6,000 for one female and one male category 10km run, P4,000 for 5km run, and P3,000 for 1km Fur Buddy run, respectively.

=== Music ===
On May 12, 2026, the official theme song of the 2026 games "The Ultimate Palaro Dream" has been released on any streaming platforms such as YouTube and Spotify. It was performed by Felix Romar Arcayna, Valerie Lorana, and Dave Joshua Baroro, Composed and Arranged by Lyndon Patrick Cabarliza, and Co-Arranged by Samson Polancos, Jr., and Baroro. Included in these playlists are: "Kasadya" by Bayang Barrios, "Diwa ng Tagumpay", "Bida ang Kabataang Atleta" by Agusan Marsh Band, "Buksan ang Bukas", "Bulawanong Paglaom" by Voices of AgSur, and "We Rise as One".

=== Media coverage ===
PTV Agusan del Sur, an analog affiliate of the state-owned PTV, will serve as the main live and streaming coverage of the said games.

=== Sponsorships ===
Co-presentors
- Philsaga Mining Corporation
- Transorient Manpower Services Corporation
- Milo Energy Drink

== Concerns and controversies ==
=== Fire incident ===
On May 27 at Talacogon Municipal Gym, an ongoing Table Tennis tournament has been temporarily suspended due to air conditioning at the back of the gymnasium, causing fire. No one has been injured, and the fire has been put out. Investigation is currently ongoing as to what happened in the fire incident during the games' Table Tennis tournament.

=== Environment and health ===
In a press statement released by Eastern Visayas delegation on May 27, their delegation confirms stomach upset among Athletes from the Arnis, Volleyball, and Rhythmic Gymnastics last May 26.

Immediate medical attention and monitoring has been provided by the designated Regional Medical Teams. Reported symptoms included abdominal pain, vomiting, and loose bowel movement. No severe cases or dehydration were recorded.

=== Track oval incident ===
On May 31, posted on RPN DXKS based in Surigao City on Facebook, they did not publicize any issue regarding the controversy of the substandard D.O. Plaza Main Stadium's track oval.

That incident comes after screenshots circulated online following the results of the 110-meter hurdles event and subsequent discussions related to track and field controversies.

It was a previous edition held in Cebu City who posted online about the track oval's controversy.

The said radio station denies any involvement of substandard controversy.

== Gallery ==
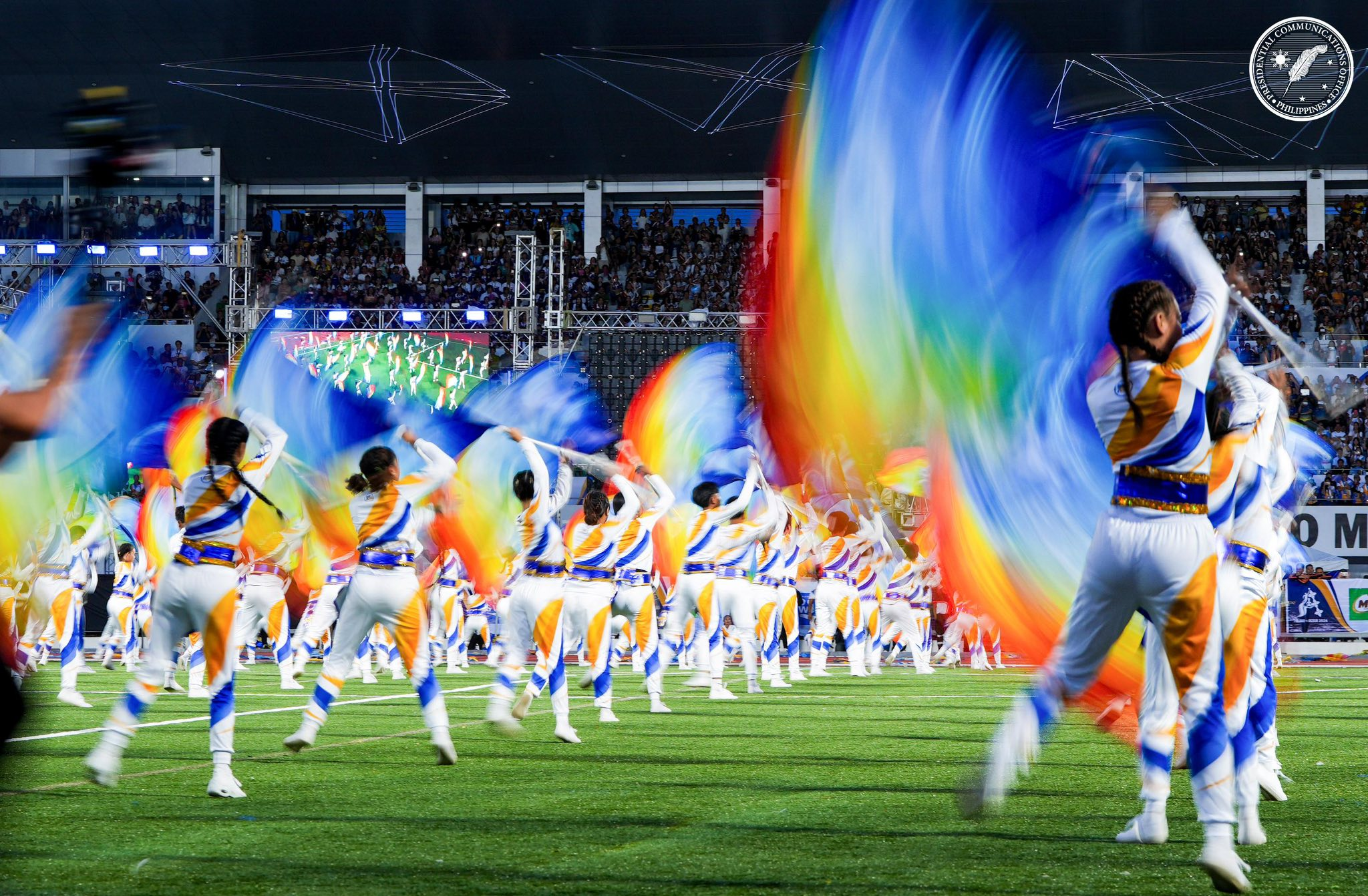
Agusan del Sur dancers during the opening ceremony

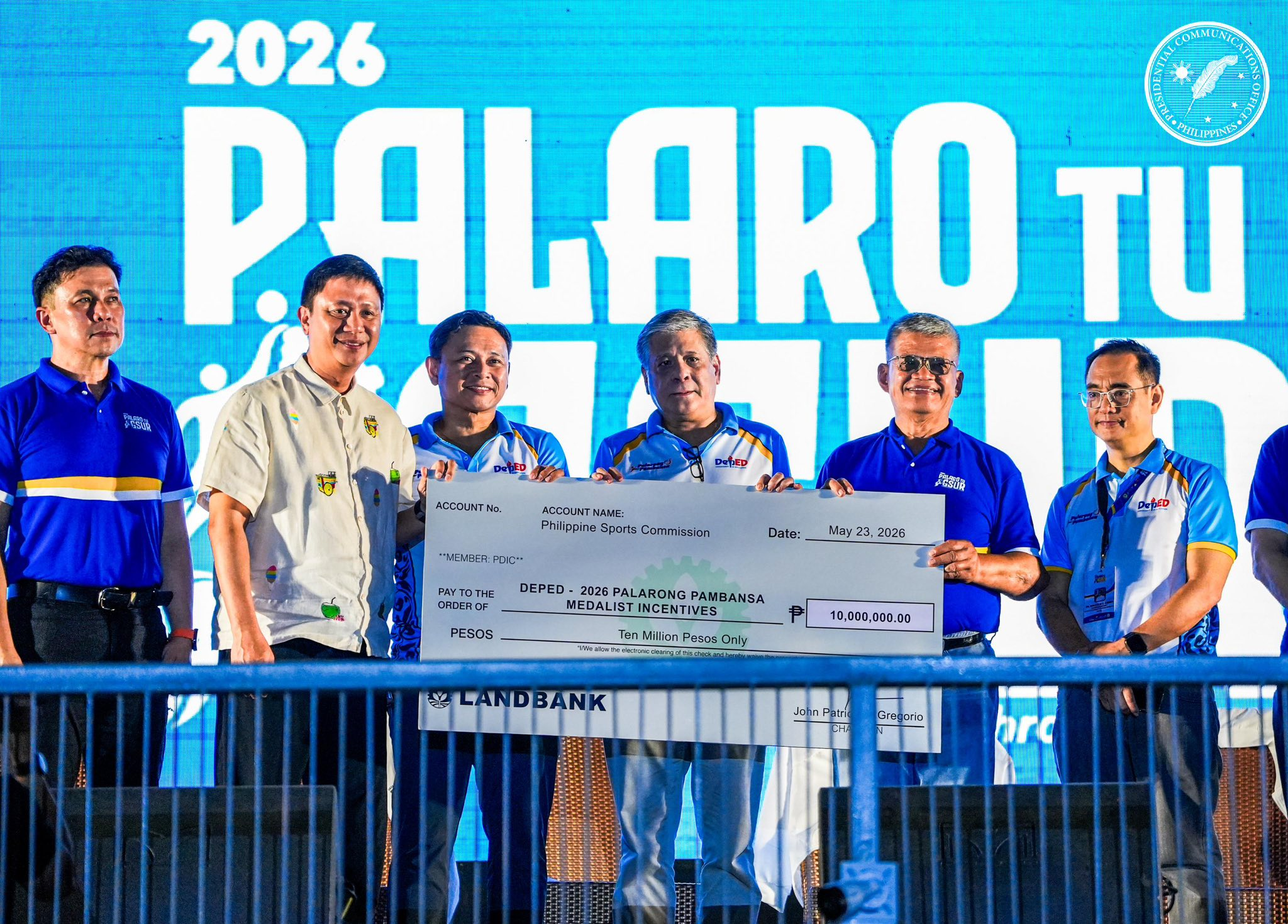
Lagdameo and the Agusan del Sur officials received an incentive for each medalist

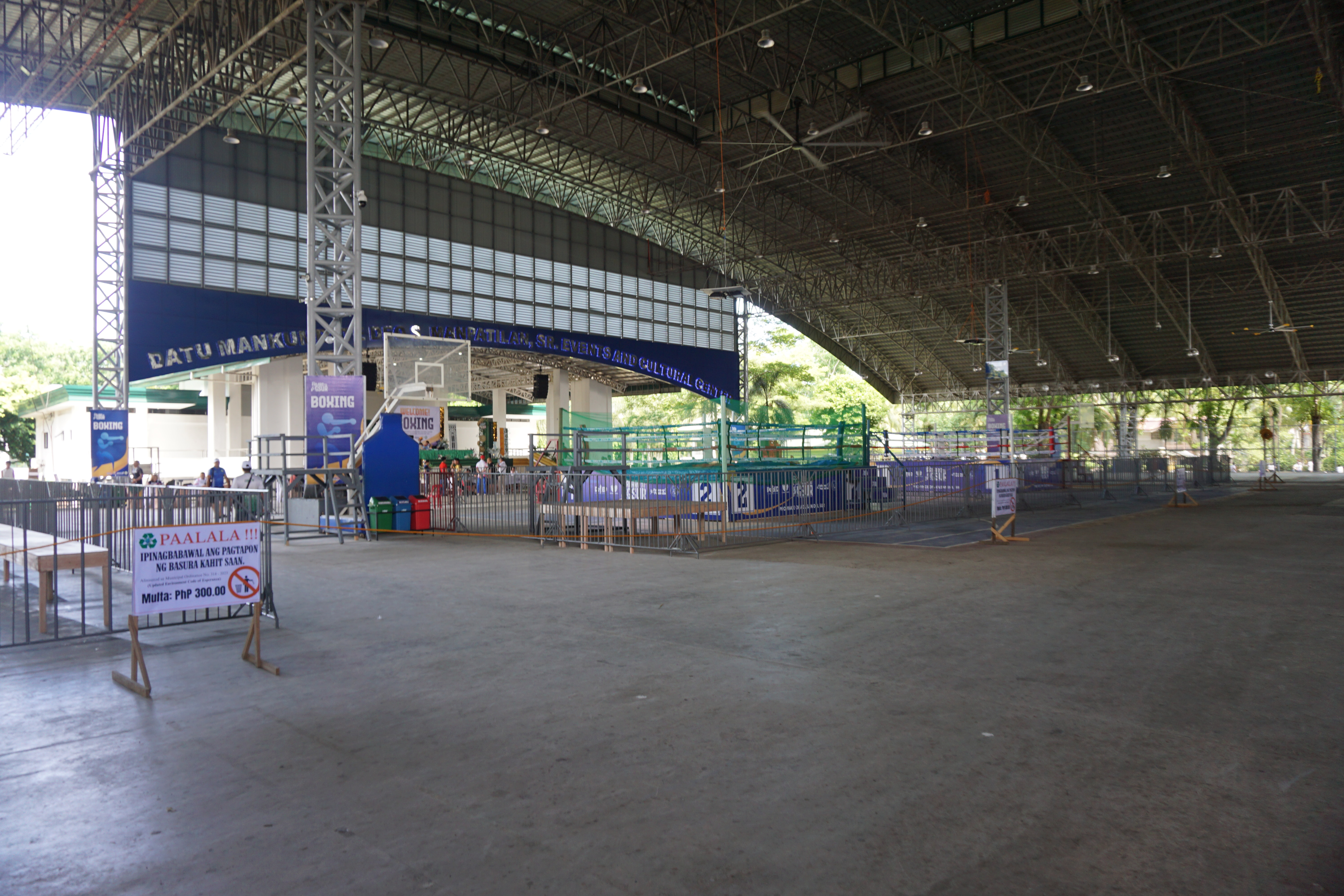
Deo Manpatilan Jr. Sports Center in Esperanza, hosted the Boxing competition

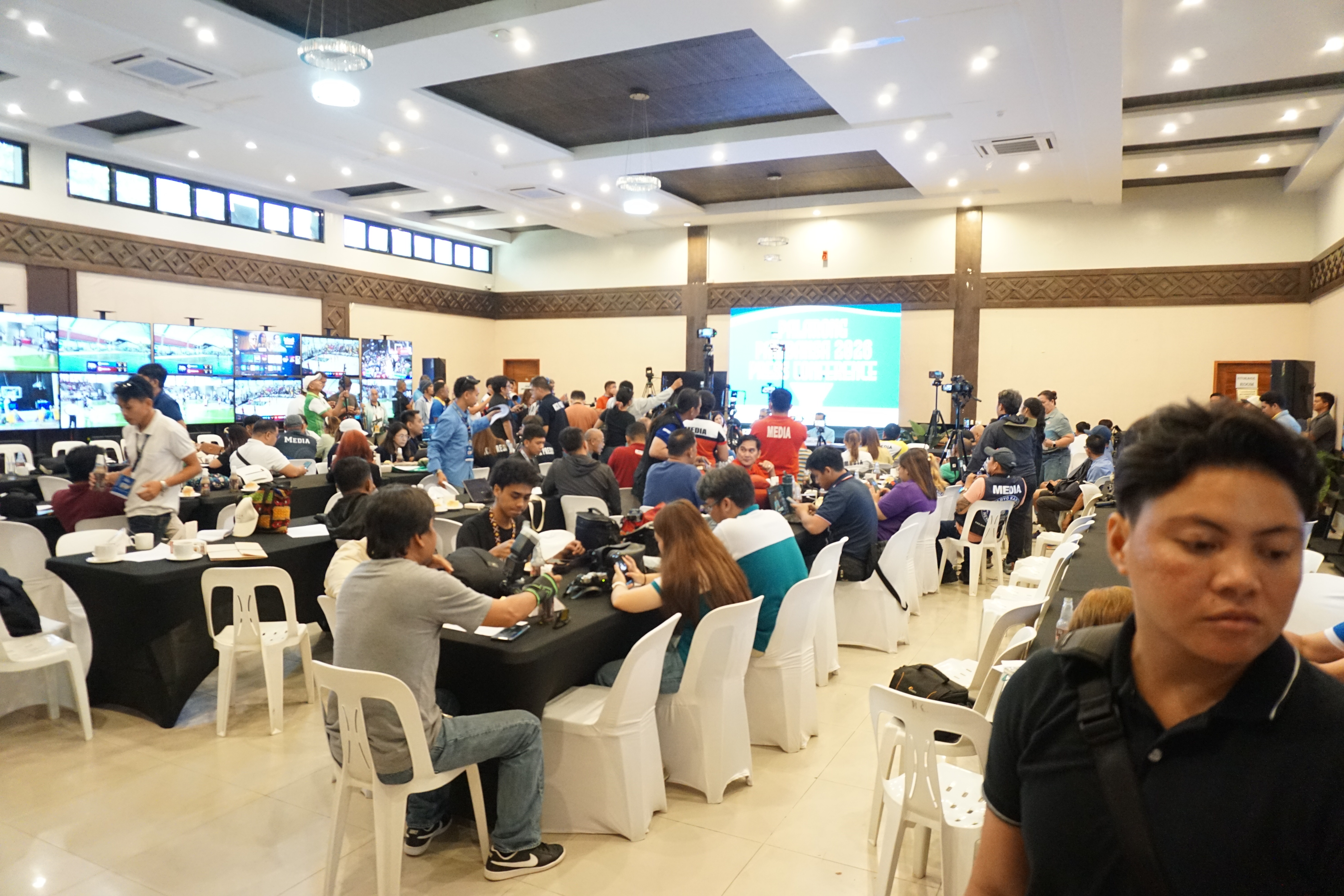
Palaro Media Center in Patin-ay, Prosperidad
