= Patin-ay Sports Complex =

Complex of sport facilities in Philippines

- Datu Lipus Makapandong - Gov. D.O. Plaza Sports Complex; D.O.P. Memorial Sports Complex
- Main Stadium before on its opening ceremony in May 23, 2026
- Interactive map of Patin-ay Sports Complex
- Full name: Datu Lipus Makapandong - Gov. D.O. Plaza Sports Complex
- Location: Patin-ay, Prosperidad, Agusan del Sur, Philippines
- Coordinates: 8°33′03.4″N 125°56′29.1″E
- Owner: Provincial Government of Agusan del Sur
- Operator: Provincial Government of Agusan del Sur
- Surface: Synthetic grass (Main Stadium); Natural grass (Open and Football Field)
- Main venue: Main Stadium; Capacity: 5,000
- Facilities: Gymnasium, Swimming Pool, Open Field, Baseball Field, EOC Evacuation Center, Gymnastics Gym

Construction
- Built: 1994
- Opened: 1994
- Renovated: 1996, 2023
- Expanded: 2026
- Closed: 2019
- Cost: ₱1.7 billion (renovation)

The Datu Lipus Makapandong - Gov. D.O. Plaza Sports Complex, also known as D.O.P. Memorial Sports Complex, commonly known as Patin-ay Sports Complex, is a complex of sport facilities located at the 138-hectare Government Center in Patin-ay, Prosperidad, Agusan del Sur, Philippines.

== History ==
The sports complex dated back in 1994 where the Agusan del Sur hosted the 1994 Palarong Pampook Northern Mindanao when the province was then under Region X. In 1995, Provincial Governor Democrito Plaza submitted a bid to host the 1996 Palarong Pambansa but lost to Region 12. The sports track oval was never been rubberized however becomes a major requirement for hosting the future games.

In 2019, Governor Adolph Edward "Eddiebong" Plaza launches the major rehabilitation of the old complex that meets the requirements of the major games such as Palarong Pambansa with Olympic and NBA standards. The rehabilitation cost ₱700 million.

It was completed in 2023 for Naliyagan Festival events.

In 2024 after the 2024 Palarong Pambansa in Cebu City, the Palaro Committee declared Agusan del Sur wins the bid over Misamis Occidental and Zamboanga City. The provincial government began to construct additional sports facilities within that sports complex that cost ₱1 billion such as the EOC Evacuation Center. It was finished by May 2026 for 2026 Palarong Pambansa.

== Facilities ==
Image	Names	Seating capacity	Notes
	Main Stadium	5,000	Largest main stadium in Caraga. Includes a hotel, an 8-lane rubberized athletics oval, and a 6,160 m^{2} (66,300 sq ft) artificial turf football field
	Swimming Pool	1,500	With 10 lane, 50 m × 25 m (164 ft × 82 ft) pool, diving pool, and touch pad
	Main Covered Court	600	With NBA-regulated hardwood court
	Open field	—N/a	
	Tennis Court	—N/a	
	Football field	—N/a	Also used for Baseball
	Rhythmic Gymnastics Gym	800	With retractable bleachers, and also used for Badminton
	EOC Evacuation Center	2,000	Meaning Emergency Operations Center. Equipped with NBA-regulated hardwood court and retractable bleachers
	Multi-purpose Covered Court	—N/a	

== See also ==
- Prosperidad
- 2026 Palarong Pambansa
- List of football stadiums in the Philippines
- List of indoor arenas in the Philippines
