= Agusan del Sur College =

Private college in Bayugan, Philippines

Coordinates: 8°42′59″N 125°44′42″E

Agusan del Sur College is an educational institution offering kindergarten to college courses in Bayugan, Agusan del Sur, Philippines. It was founded in 1966 by Inocencio P. Angeles and Clarita J. Angeles.
