= Bayugan =

Component city in Agusan del Sur, Philippines

- Component city
- City of Bayugan
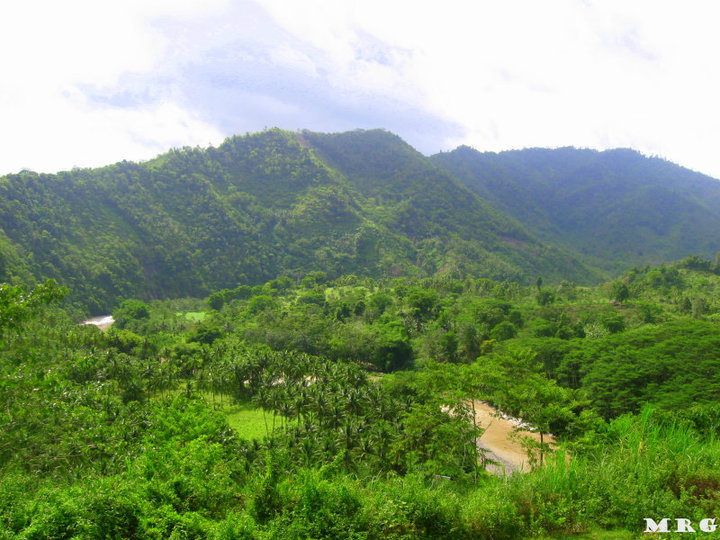
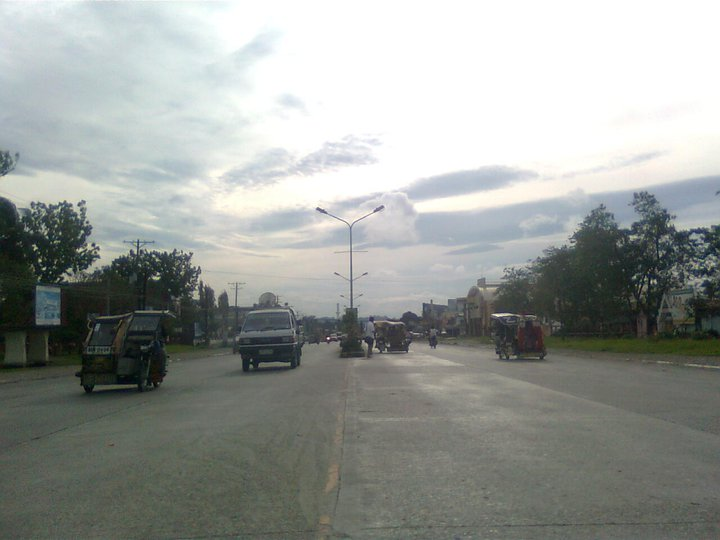
- Top right to left: Rotunda Park, City Hall, Narra Avenue, Mountains in Bayugan, Sacred Heart of Jesus Parish

- Seal

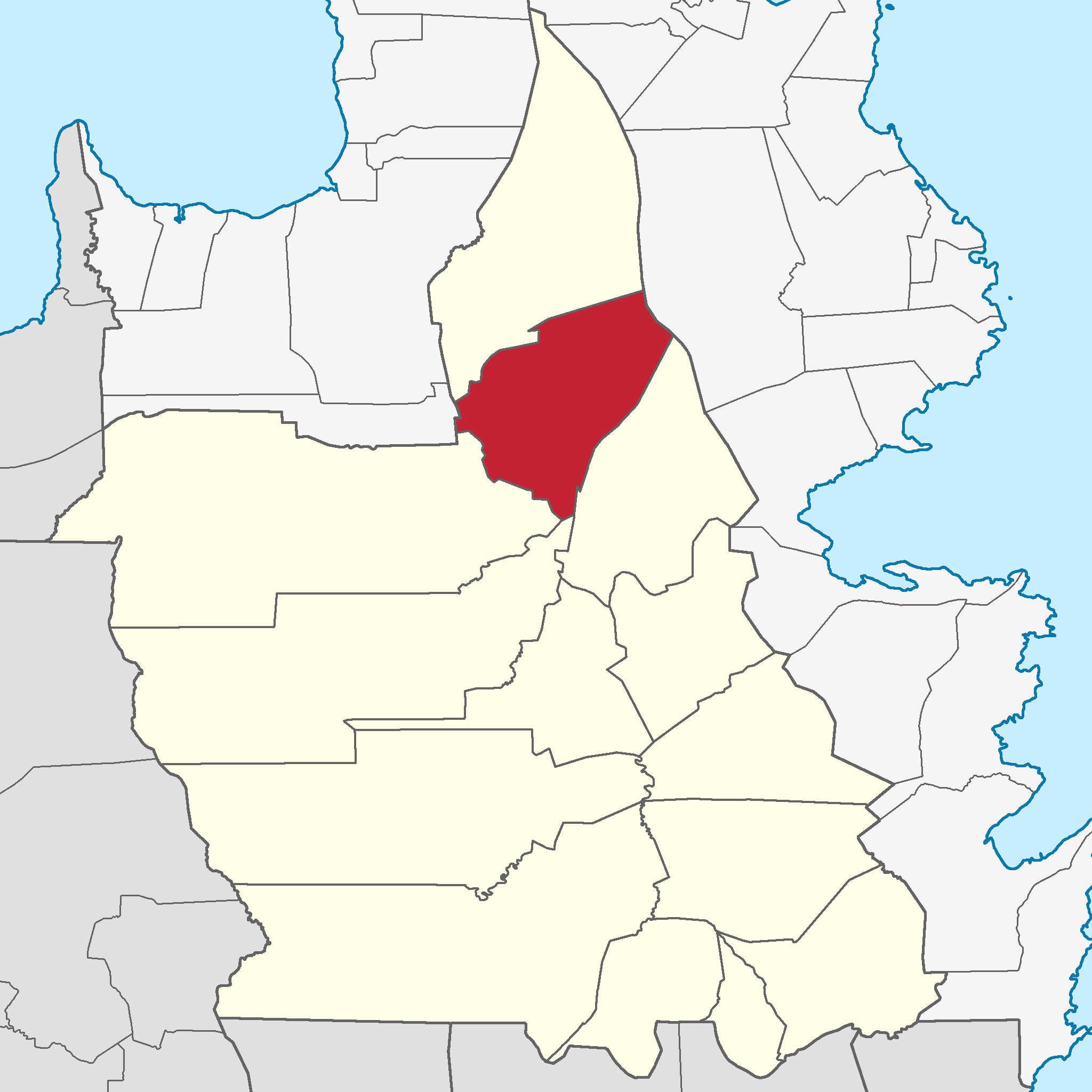
- Map of Agusan del Sur with Bayugan highlighted
- Interactive map of Bayugan
- Location within the Philippines
- Coordinates: 8°43′N 125°45′E
- Country: Philippines
- Region: Caraga
- Province: Agusan del Sur
- District: 1st district
- Founded: August 20, 1961
- Cityhood: June 21, 2007 (Lost cityhood in 2008 and 2010)
- Affirmed Cityhood: February 15, 2011
- Barangays: 43 (see Barangays)

Government
  - Type: Sangguniang Panlungsod
  - Mayor: Kirk A. Asis
  - Vice Mayor: Kim "Tata" Asis
  - Representative: Alfelito M. Bascug
  - City Council: Members: Kim Lope A. Asis; Dionril R. Salvan; Merla P. Ajan; An Janette A. Alonde-Rana; Charles P. Anggayong; Gilbert M. Honculada; Charles C. Salazar; Fortunato A. Paway II; Tereso Abastillas; Allan Cogollodo; Niña A. Asis; Emgee Jhensen B. Lopez
  - Electorate: 64,738 voters (2025)

Area
  - Total: 688.77 km^{2} (265.94 sq mi)
- Elevation: 270 m (890 ft)
- Highest elevation: 1,295 m (4,249 ft)
- Lowest elevation: 8 m (26 ft)

Population (2024 census)
  - Total: 110,313
  - Density: 160.16/km^{2} (414.81/sq mi)
  - Households: 26,259
- Demonym: Bayuganon

Economy
  - Income class: 1st city income class
  - Poverty incidence: 21.61% (2023)
  - Revenue: ₱ 266.9 million (2024)
  - Assets: ₱ 593 million (2024)
  - Expenditure: ₱ 266.5 million (2024)
  - Liabilities: ₱ 179.3 million (2024)

Service provider
  - Electricity: Agusan del Sur Electric Cooperative (ASELCO)
- Time zone: UTC+8 (PST)
- ZIP code: 8502
- PSGC: 1600301000
- IDD : area code: +63 (0)85
- Native languages: Agusan; Butuanon; Cebuano; Higaonon; Tagalog
- Website: www.bayugan.gov.ph

Bayugan, officially the City of Bayugan (Cebuano: Dakbayan sa Bayugan; Filipino: Lungsod ng Bayugan), is a component city in the province of Agusan del Sur, Philippines. According to the 2024 census, it has a population of 110,313 people.

Having gained cityhood through Republic Act No. 9405, it is the only city in the province of Agusan del Sur and also the most populous.

Located at the northern part of Agusan del Sur, Bayugan is the "cut-flower capital" of the province owing to its lucrative cut flower industry. The city's climate, especially in the highland barangays, is conducive to high yield cut-flower production. The city is also one of the major producers of rice and vegetables in the province, even providing for neighboring municipalities and provinces.

== Etymology ==
The natives called the area Bayugan since the word bayugan is a Manobo term for pathway. Another version states that bayug trees used to grow abundantly in the area. It was also believed that the natives used to make this place their meeting spot and that the means of gathering the inhabitants was by knocking on a hollow piece of wood which they termed as the bayug.

== History ==
Bayugan was formerly a sitio of Barangay Maygatasan, Esperanza. Several versions abound on how the sitio got its name. First, the place was located along the river which served as the pathway of the natives in going to Esperanza.

In 1942, Japanese troops entered Bayugan during the second World War.

In 1945, the town of Bayugan in Southern Agusan was liberated by Filipino soldiers and guerrillas from the Japanese forces occupying the town.

In 1948, the Department of Public Works and Highways conducted a survey for a National Highway that would connect Butuan with Davao City. Simultaneously, the Bureau of Lands surveyed the places that would be traversed by the proposed road. Possible town sites were identified and among them was Barangay Maygatasan. However, part of the National Highway (now the Narra Avenue) passed through the sitio of Bayugan instead of Barangay Maygatasan. Migrants started settling in the sitio of Bayugan, thus, prompting the transfer of the proposed town site.

In the early part of 1960, the inhabitants led by Mr. Jose Joson passed a resolution creating the sitio of Bayugan into a regular barrio. In April of that year, Barangay Bayugan was inaugurated with Joson as the Teniente del Barrio. Brought about by the construction of the National Highway which traversed the place, business activity sprouted rapidly in the area.

A year later, barangay officials led by then Sergio Mullaneda worked out the creation of Bayugan into a regular municipality through the assistance of Governor Democrito Plaza, Governor of Agusan. By virtue of Executive Order No. 440 of then President Carlos P. Garcia, the petition to create the municipality of Bayugan was granted on August 6, 1961. Mr. Mullaneda, the first appointed Municipal Mayor of Bayugan assumed into office on August 6, 1962, during the term of President Diosdado Macapagal. In the year 2007 Bayugan was converted to a city.

Bayugan is a transportation highway nexus for the eastern part of Mindanao Island. Bayugan is now one if not the fastest growing component city in North Eastern Mindanao.

=== Cityhood ===
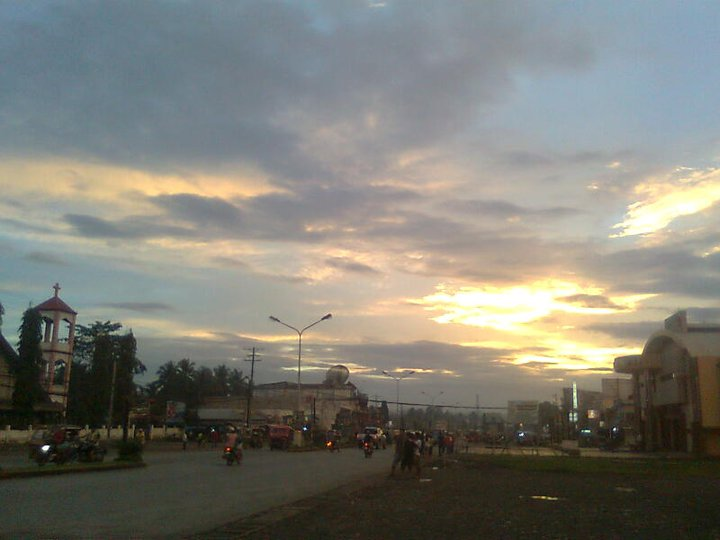
Narra Avenue

On July 24, 2006, the congress approved R.A. 9405, an act converting the Municipality of Bayugan into a component city to be known as the City of Bayugan.

But in 2008, the Supreme Court of the Philippines declared the law unconstitutional. The court ruled that Bayugan, along with the other fifteen cities covered by the law did not meet the requirements for cityhood.

More than a year later, on December 22, 2009, acting favorably on the appeal of the sixteen affected cities, the Supreme Court reversed its earlier ruling. It deemed that the passage of the amendatory law regarding the criteria for cityhood as set by congress specifically exempting a particular political subdivision therefrom was constitutional. The court further ruled that congress, in enacting the exempting law, effectively decreased the already codified indicators. As such, the cityhood status of Bayugan, and the rest of the fifteen local government units was restored.

But again on August 24, 2010, in a 16-page resolution, the court reinstated its November 18, 2008 decision striking down the constitutionality of Republic Act 9405. Voting 7–6, with two justices abstaining, the court reinstated its decision declaring RA 9405 as unconstitutional.

However, in another twist of fate for Bayugan, the court once again upheld for the third and final time the constitutionality of RA 9405 on February 15, 2011, thereby finalizing the cityhood of Bayugan and the other fifteen municipalities affected by the law. On July 3, 2011, the court ordered its clerk of court to issue an entry of judgment on the cityhood case, sealing with finality the constitutionality of the law.

After six years of legal battle, in its board resolution, the League of Cities of the Philippines acknowledged and recognized the cityhood of Bayugan and 15 other cities.

== Geography ==
Bayugan is bordered by the Municipality of Sibagat and the province of Surigao del Sur to the north; the Municipality of Prosperidad to the east; the Municipality of Esperanza to the south; and the Municipality of Las Nieves, Agusan del Norte, to the west.

=== Climate ===
Climate data for Bayugan
Month	Jan	Feb	Mar	Apr	May	Jun	Jul	Aug	Sep	Oct	Nov	Dec	Year
Mean daily maximum °C (°F)	30 (86)	31 (88)	31 (88)	33 (91)	33 (91)	33 (91)	32 (90)	33 (91)	33 (91)	32 (90)	32 (90)	31 (88)	32 (90)
Mean daily minimum °C (°F)	23 (73)	23 (73)	23 (73)	24 (75)	25 (77)	24 (75)	24 (75)	24 (75)	24 (75)	24 (75)	24 (75)	24 (75)	24 (75)
Average precipitation mm (inches)	259.1 (10.20)	236.7 (9.32)	131.5 (5.18)	102.6 (4.04)	104.9 (4.13)	155.8 (6.13)	146.4 (5.76)	103.6 (4.08)	123.1 (4.85)	166.8 (6.57)	166.5 (6.56)	242.7 (9.56)	1,939.7 (76.37)
Average precipitation days	22	19	18	13	15	20	18	16	16	19	21	24	221
Source: World Weather Online

The city is geographically situated below the typhoon belt but is usually affected by depressions forming in the typhoon regions of Visayas and the province of Surigao del Norte. The climate map of the Philippines based on the modified coronas classification shows that the city falls under Type II. Which also is the weather classification of the province of Agusan del Sur.

Type II climate has no dry season with very pronounced wet season of heavy precipitation. Maximum rainfall generally occurs from December to January although there is no single dry month. Its average monthly rainfall is 161.6 millimetres (6.36 in) and average temperature is 32 °C (90 °F). Areas characterized by this climate type are generally along or very near the eastern coast thus are open to the north-east monsoon.

=== Barangays ===
Bayugan is politically subdivided into 43 barangays. Each barangay consists of puroks while some have sitios.

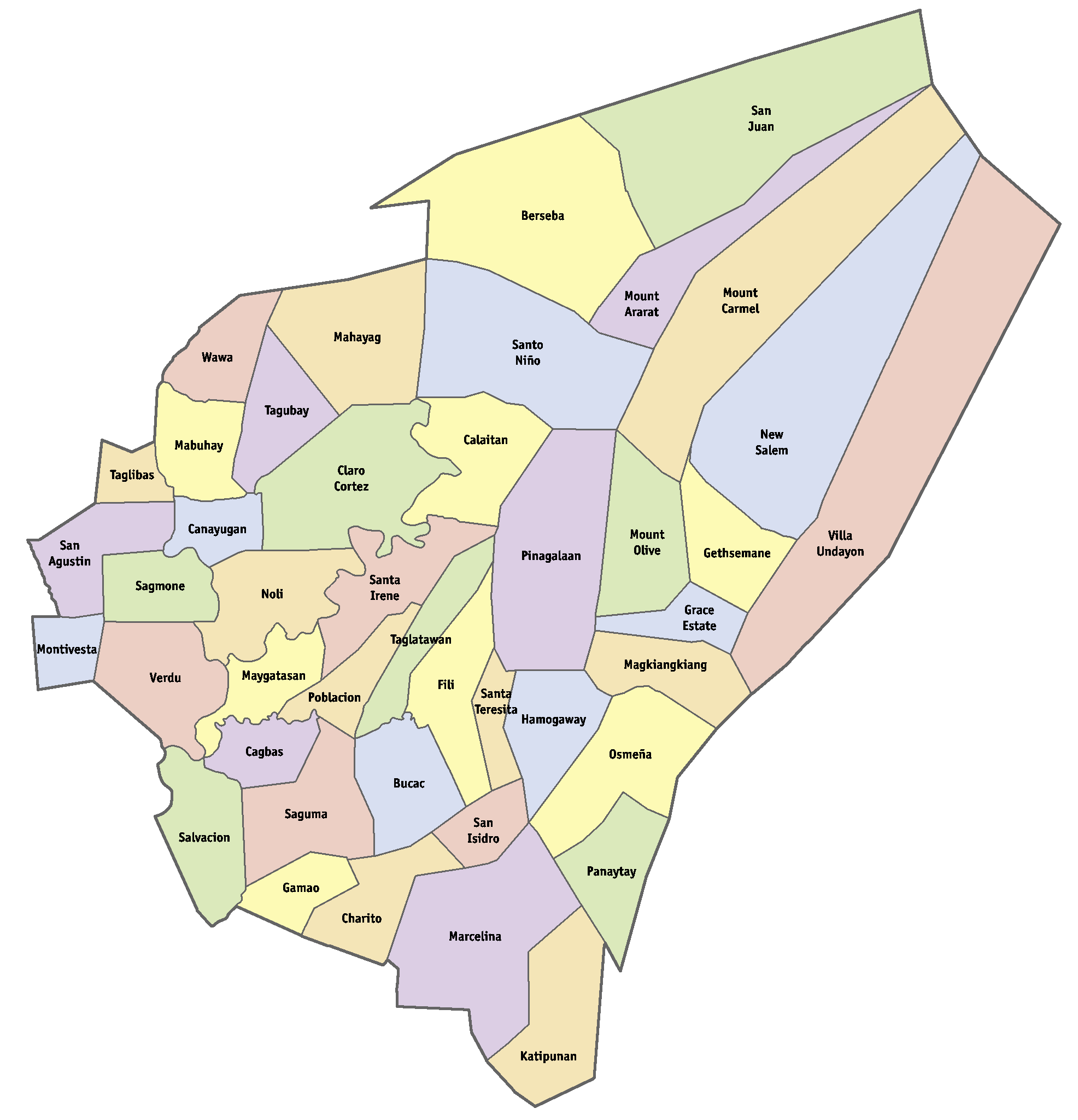
Political map of Bayugan

Currently, there are 3 barangays which classified as urban and 40 are rural.

PSGC	Barangay	Population			±% p.a.	
		2024		2010		
160301028	Berseba	1.4%	1,585	1,688	▾	−0.43%
160301029	Bucac	3.6%	3,918	3,367	▴	1.05%
160301030	Cagbas	1.7%	1,923	1,757	▴	0.63%
160301001	Calaitan	1.7%	1,913	2,385	▾	−1.51%
160301031	Canayugan	1.0%	1,156	1,167	▾	−0.07%
160301002	Charito	1.4%	1,549	1,529	▴	0.09%
160301032	Claro Cortez	0.7%	819	654	▴	1.57%
160301003	Fili	2.7%	2,949	2,923	▴	0.06%
160301033	Gamao	1.0%	1,096	1,035	▴	0.40%
160301034	Getsemane	0.4%	398	436	▾	−0.63%
160301035	Grace Estate	0.6%	677	651	▴	0.27%
160301004	Hamogaway	1.4%	1,508	1,568	▾	−0.27%
160301006	Katipunan	1.1%	1,225	1,135	▴	0.53%
160301007	Mabuhay	1.6%	1,730	1,750	▾	−0.08%
160301036	Magkiangkang	1.6%	1,801	1,628	▴	0.70%
160301037	Mahayag	0.6%	629	554	▴	0.88%
160301009	Marcelina	3.4%	3,789	3,508	▴	0.53%
160301010	Maygatasan	4.4%	4,818	4,148	▴	1.04%
160301038	Montivesta	0.6%	709	602	▴	1.14%
160301039	Mt. Ararat	0.6%	684	821	▾	−1.25%
160301040	Mt. Carmel	2.2%	2,387	2,047	▴	1.07%
160301041	Mt. Olive	1.4%	1,509	1,501	▴	0.04%
160301042	New Salem	0.5%	569	663	▾	−1.05%
160301011	Noli	3.4%	3,712	3,380	▴	0.65%
160301013	Osmeña	1.4%	1,589	1,573	▴	0.07%
160301014	Panaytay	0.6%	695	624	▴	0.75%
160301043	Pinagalaan	1.3%	1,411	1,108	▴	1.68%
160301016	Poblacion	14.5%	16,010	17,596	▾	−0.65%
160301017	Sagmone	1.2%	1,301	1,157	▴	0.81%
160301018	Saguma	2.0%	2,215	1,937	▴	0.93%
160301019	Salvacion	5.3%	5,886	5,079	▴	1.02%
160301044	San Agustin	0.6%	679	613	▴	0.71%
160301020	San Isidro	1.1%	1,206	1,046	▴	0.99%
160301045	San Juan	3.0%	3,307	3,391	▾	−0.17%
160301023	Santa Irene	3.3%	3,651	2,820	▴	1.80%
160301046	Santa Teresita	1.7%	1,828	1,668	▴	0.63%
160301047	Santo Niño	1.5%	1,606	1,643	▾	−0.16%
160301024	Taglatawan	11.6%	12,838	12,976	▾	−0.07%
160301048	Taglibas	0.4%	402	386	▴	0.28%
160301049	Tagubay	0.8%	930	749	▴	1.51%
160301025	Verdu	1.4%	1,562	1,373	▴	0.89%
160301050	Villa Undayon	1.5%	1,609	1,312	▴	1.42%
160301027	Wawa	1.2%	1,334	1,413	▾	−0.40%
	Total		110,313	99,361	▴	0.72%

== Demographics ==
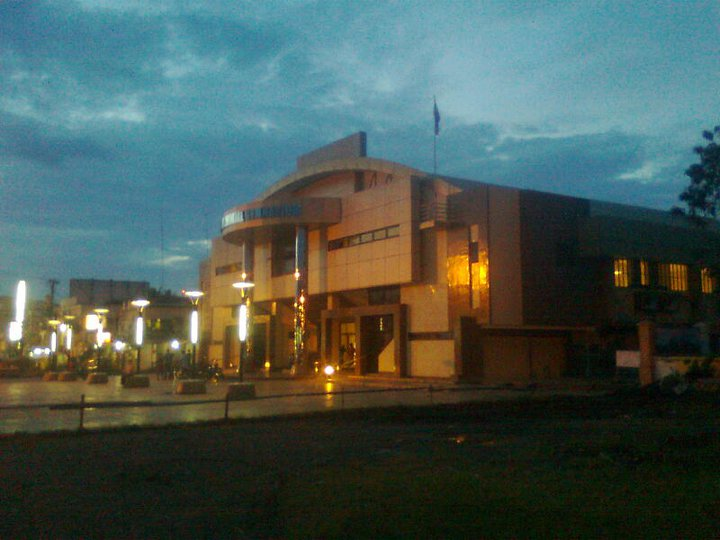
Lope Asis Memorial Gymnasium

Population census of Bayugan
Year	Pop.	±% p.a.
1970	37,816	—
1975	43,603	+2.90%
1980	56,367	+5.27%
1990	78,725	+3.40%
1995	89,999	+2.54%
2000	93,623	+0.85%
2007	95,032	+0.21%
2010	99,361	+1.63%
2015	103,202	+0.72%
2020	109,499	+1.25%
2024	110,313	+0.18%
Source: Philippine Statistics Authority

Indigenous people:

- Manobo
- Higaonon
- Banwaon
- Kamayo/Mandaya
- Talaandig

== Economy ==
Poverty incidence of Bayugan (%)

Source: Philippine Statistics Authority

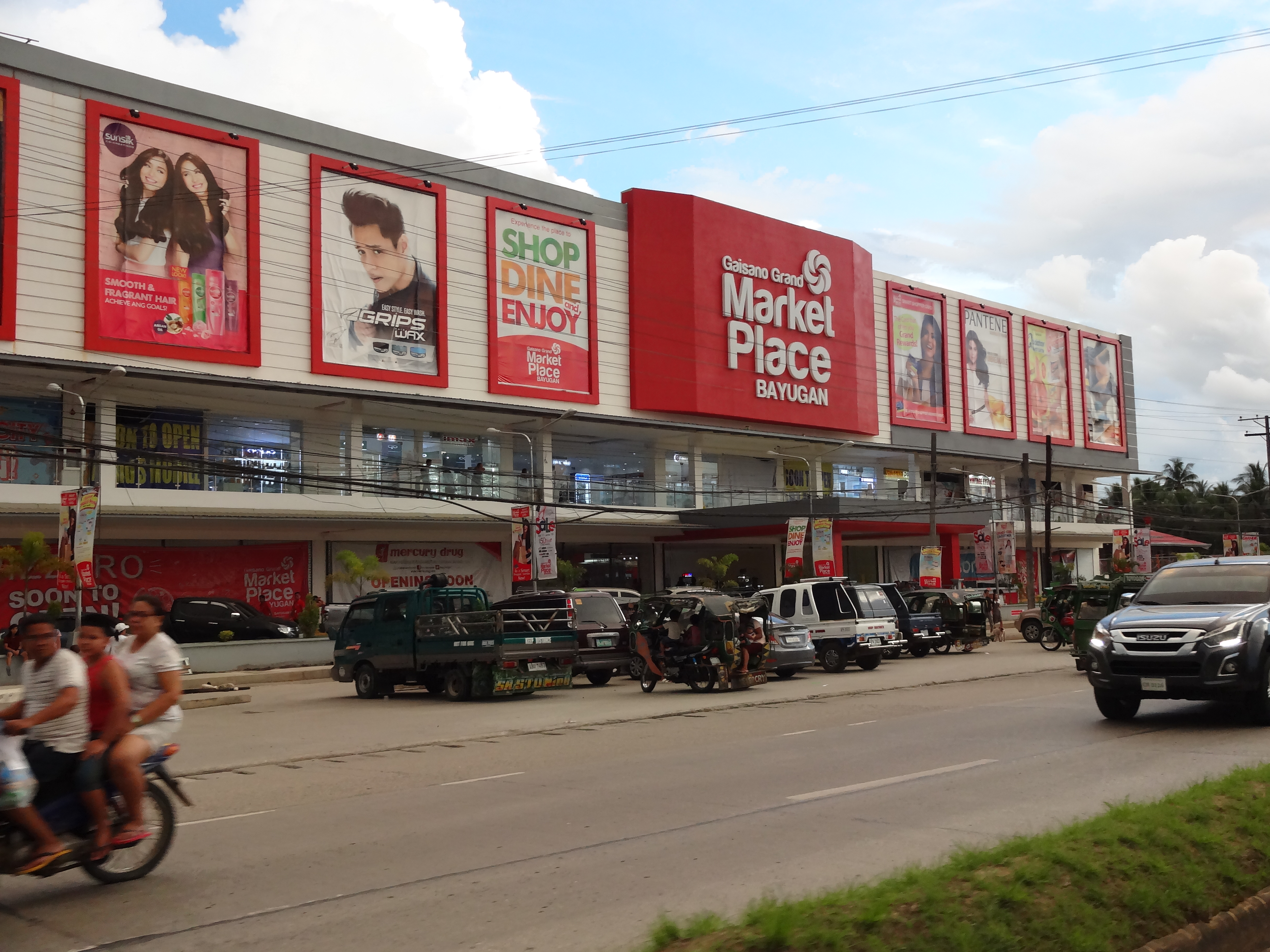
Gaisano Grand Market Place Bayugan

Products

- Rice / palay (the major rice production site of Agusan del Sur)
- Cut flowers (abundant in the city making it the cut flower capital of Agusan del Sur)
- Corn
- Coconut
- Banana
- Rubber
- Vegetables
- Legumes
- Cacao
- Coffee
- Citrus
- Root Crops
- Fruits

Fertile soil suitable for agricultural, Protection Forest About 26,107.163 Hectares = 51.697% in land classifications. Gold, silver, sand and gravel.

== Government ==
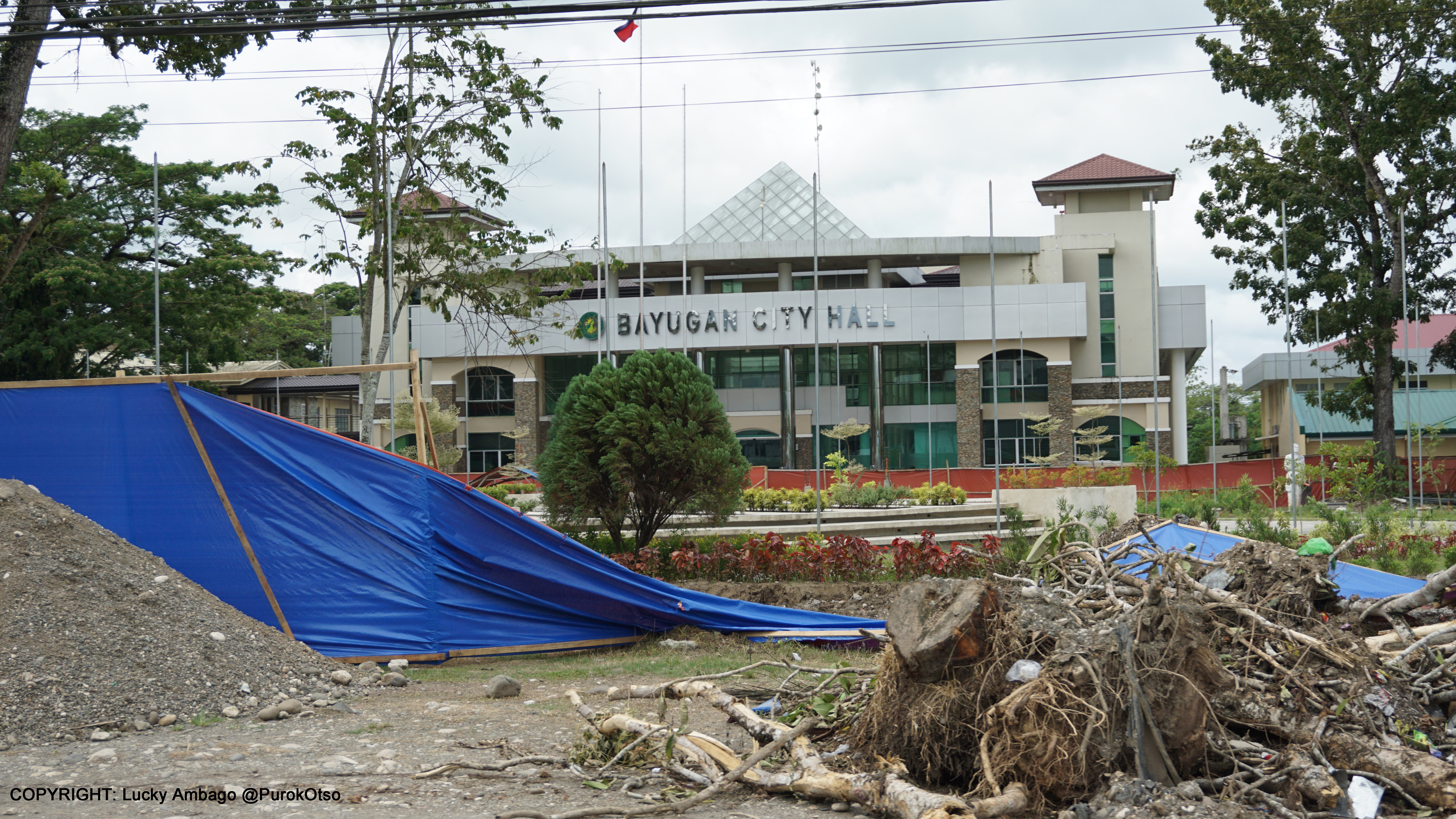
Bayugan City Hall in the background

=== City officials ===
Elected city officials 2025–present:

Executive:

- Mayor: Kirk A. Asis
- Vice Mayor: Kim "Tata" Asis

Legislative:

- City councilors:
  - Kim Lope A. Asis
  - Dionril "Balong" Salvan
  - Merla Ajan
  - Anjannette "Badat" Alonde-Rana
  - Charles P. Anggayong
  - Fortunato "Jun" Paway II
  - Jonathan D. Sayon
  - Teresito "Terry" Abastillas
  - Allan R. Cogollodo
  - Gilbert Honculada

=== Barangay council ===
Association of Baragay Councils (Liga ng mga Barangay):

- President - Eleony G. Estrera (Barangay Gethsemane)
- Vice President - Vacant position

== Tourism ==
- Bayugan Rotunda
- Pinagalaan (Bayug/Hamogaway) Falls
- Narra Avenue
- Wawa Bridge
- Meteor Garden
- Gethsemane Falls
- Santa Irene Overview
- Andanan/Wawa River and Irrigation System
- Family Place Resort
- Green Haven Adventure Farm
- Mangrove Base Park
- ARC Bayugan
- Graceland Cold Spring
- Magkiangkang Cave
- New Loon Cave
- San Agustin Lake
- Putting Bato Cave
- Katipunan Lake
- Vising/Sisimon Cave
- Rizal Park Plaza
- Bayugan City Hall
- Sacred Heart of Jesus Parish Church
- San Lorenzo Ruiz Diocesan Shrine
- Ziram Garden
- Sisa Theme Nature Park

== Culture ==
=== Local festivals and events ===
- Kahimunan tu Bayugan Festival, Holy Child - A local version of the Sinulog Festival of Cebu, it is highlighted by street dancing focusing on the indigenous tribes' of Bayugan and their way of life. Celebrated every Last Sunday of January.
- Sacred Heart of Jesus Festival – Popularly known as the town fiesta or "pista", celebrated every June 30.
- Rice Corn and Flower Festival - A new born festival replacing the traditional "Araw ng Bayugan" and is a celebration of the abundant harvest of crops of farmers in the city. The name of the festival is coined from the nickname of the city (City of Rice, Corn, and Flowers). It highlights street dancing and float contests.
- Charter Day Celebration - Held every June 21 to commemorate the city-hood of Bayugan.

== Infrastructure ==
=== Communications ===
The Philippine Long Distance Telephone Company provides fixed line services. Wireless mobile communications services are provided by Smart Communications and Globe Telecommunications.

=== Transportation ===
Major transportation around the vicinity of the city are Motorela/Tricycle and some multicabs which travel to remote barangays. "Habal-habal" is also used as a transport to the mountain barangays of Bayugan.

==== Accessibility ====
By air

Butuan Airport: Butuan has the nearest airport from Bayugan.

Davao Airport: From Manila or Cebu to Davao City as transit point.

Surigao Airport: From Manila or Cebu to Surigao City as transit point.

By land

Bayugan can be reached via land transport. Davao Metro Shuttle, Bachelor Express, Land Car Inc., and Surigao Express are only few bus companies travelling to and from the city. Buses are serving routes from Davao City, Butuan, Surigao City, and Bislig. Philtranco and PP Bus Line serving Pasay/Cubao via Butuan or Davao are also available.

Accredited Transport Cooperative as of January 2021:

- Agusan Sur Transport Service Cooperative

By sea

Inter-island vessels Cokaliong Shipping Lines, 2-Go and TransAsia Shipping Lines ply the Cebu-Nasipit routes on regular schedules with Nasipit Port as transit point. Multi-cabs and buses are available at the wharf going to Butuan Integrated Terminal for the regular bus trips to Bayugan.

== Education ==
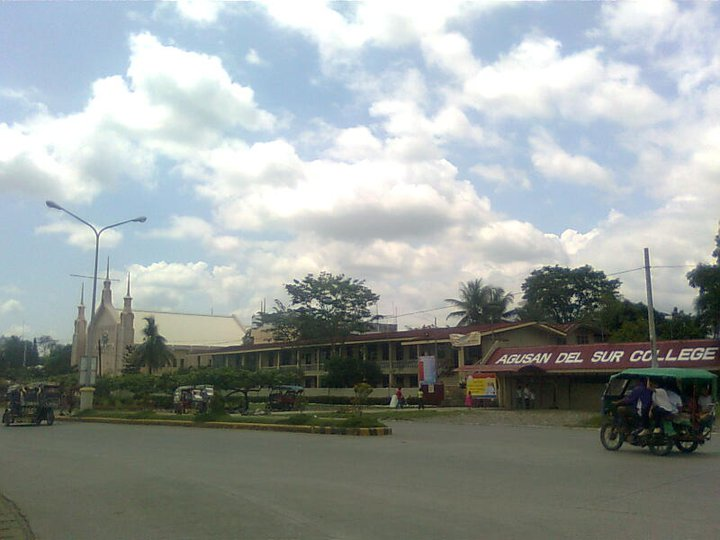
Agusan del Sur College, a private college institution in Bayugan.

Agusan del Sur Pilot Laboratory School, or commonly known as ADSPILS, is a Public Elementary School. ADSPILS is the only Special Science Elementary School in the city. The school has about 600 pupils with over 3 sections in each grade, Science Class, Best Class and Crack.

Bayugan National Comprehensive High School, or BNCHS, is a comprehensive high school with a population of about six thousand students, and is located on a site that has an area of 5 hectares. The school is currently recognized for its research program in science related topics. "Comprehensive" it is because it offers different curricula such as ESEP (Engineering and Science Education Program), Special Program in Journalism (pilot school for journalism in Caraga Region), Special Program in the Arts (with the specialization of Visual Arts, Creative Writing, Dancing, Music, Media Arts and Theater Arts), Technical Vocational Courses, Special Program in Sports and Revised Basic Education Curriculum.

Agusan del Sur College or ADSCO established in 1966, is the only private educational institution in the city offering Preparatory, Elementary, High School, College (CHED) degree courses i.e. Bachelor of Science in Business Administration (BSBA) major in : Marketing Management, Financial Management, Operation Management, Bachelor of Secondary Education, Bachelor of Elementary Education, Bachelor of Arts major in English, Associate in Computer Secretarial, Bachelor of Science in Hotel and Restaurant Management (by year 2011) and TESDA programs like Health Care Services NC II, Computer Hardware Servicing NC II, Shielded Metal Arc Welding (SMAW) NC II, Driving NC II, Security Services NC II, Massage Therapy NC II, Housekeeping, Commercial Cooking NC II, Bookkeeping NC II.

Father Saturnino Urios University (formerly Father Urios Technical Institute of Bayugan Inc. or FUTIBI), is the oldest private educational institution in the city. Located at the heart of the city making it one of the most populous school in Bayugan. Created in the year 1959, Urios caters elementary and secondary basic education. By school year 2010–2011, Urios will be putting up its technical courses. The school was founded by a Jesuit priest Father Atanasio B. De Castro in 1959. The school is currently headed by Mrs. Chereil C. Martel (Principal) and Fr. Jenor P. Luis (School Director).

== Sister cities ==
- Butuan, Philippines
- Davao City, Philippines
- Makati, Philippines
- Cebu City, Philippines

== Gallery ==
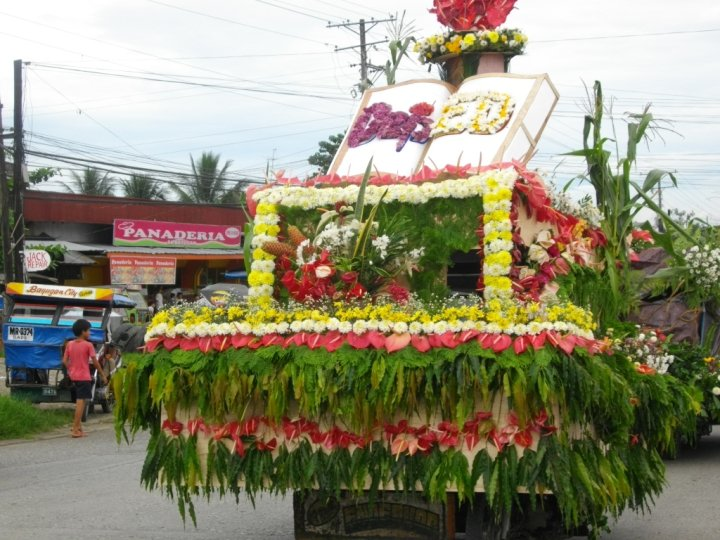
A flower float during the float contest of the Rice Corn and Flower Festival.

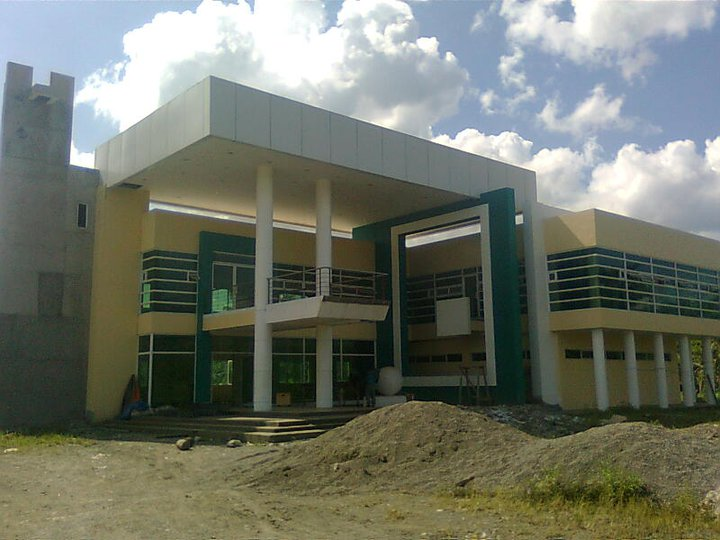
Bayugan City Division of the Department of Education.

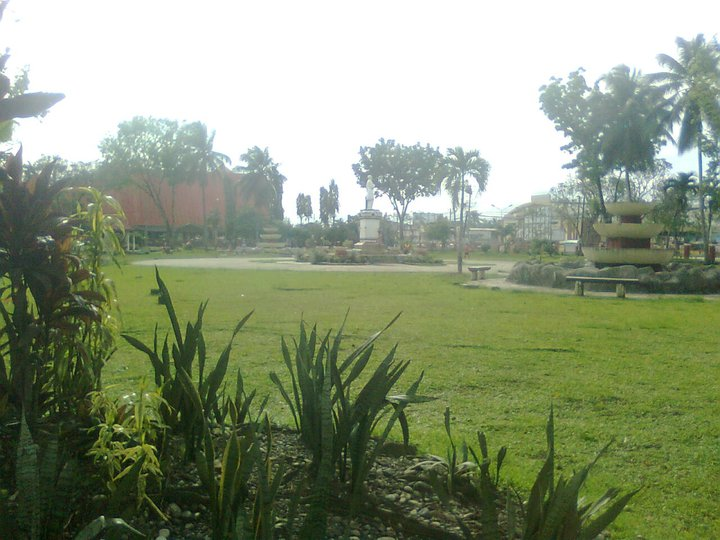
Bayugan Rizal Park Plaza

Bayugan City Convention Center during the 2026 Palarong Pambansa.
