= Bayugan National Comprehensive High School =

Public high school in Agusan del Sur, Philippines

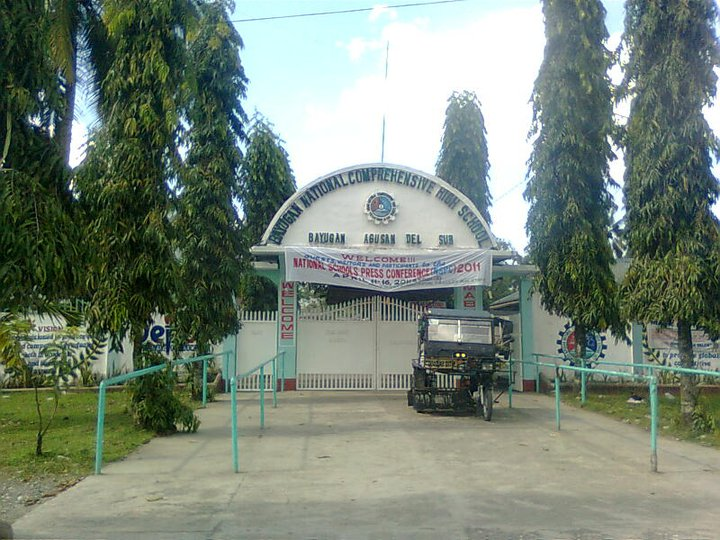
- BNCHS Main Gate (2011)

Location
- Narra Avenue, Poblacion; Bayugan, Agusan del Sur; Philippines
- Coordinates: 8°42′53.3″N 125°45′45.07″E

Information
- Type: Public School
- Established: April 18, 1980
- School district: 1st District of Agusan del Sur
- Principal: Minda I. Teposo
- Grades: 7 to 12
- Enrollment: 5350 (est. 2010)
- Campus size: 5 Hectares
- Colors: Green; White
- Nickname: Compre

Bayugan National Comprehensive High School (BNCHS) (Filipino:Pambansang Mataas na Paaralang Komprehinsibo ng Bayugan), popularly known as Compre, is a public, coeducational, comprehensive high school in Bayugan, Agusan del Sur, Philippines.

Its main campus is located on five hectares, and has a population of around 6,000 students, making it the most populous in the province.

== History ==
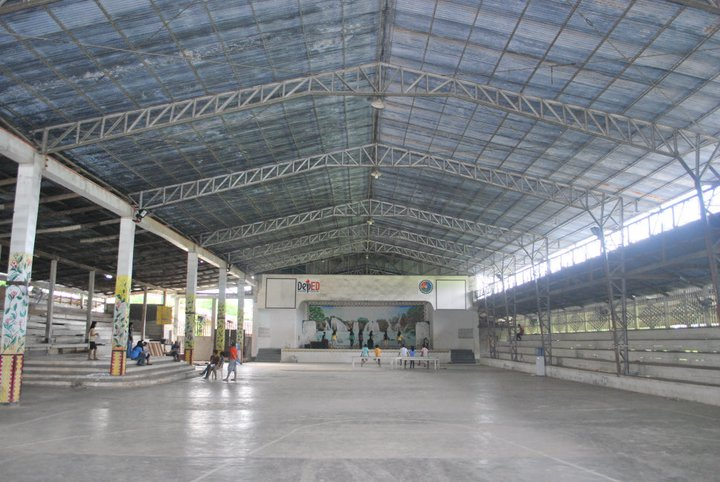
The Bayugan National Comprehensive High School Gymnasium.

The Bayugan National Comprehensive High School, formerly called Bayugan Municipal Comprehensive High School was conceived in 1975 but came to reality in April 1980 when Sangguniang Bayan of Bayugan through the initiative and leadership of the Municipal Mayor Vicente P. Encendencia passed a municipal resolution no. 37 creating the school.

On June 14, 1980, the school opened the first two years of secondary curriculum with 105 first year and 26 second year students and six faculty members. It was opened adjacent to the burned Bayugan Municipal Hospital.

== Student life ==
=== Extracurricular activities ===
The school has a recognized research program in science-related topics. In the 2015 edition of Intel International Science and Engineering Fair (ISEF) held in Pittsburgh, Pennsylvania, USA, BNCHS won its first ISEF award of any kind, a Third Grand Award, in one of the highly contested categories - the Biomedical & Health Sciences Category. Notably, this is also the highest placement ever achieved by the Philippines in the said ISEF category, which was secured by the team of Kenneth Michael Angelo N. Antonio, Thea Marie L. Tinaja, and Marian R. Cabuntocan. In addition, the same team dominated the first ever edition of ASEAN Student Science Project Competition held in Pathum Thani Thailand, July 6–10, 2015. They bested several other student projects from various Southeast Asian countries by bagging 1st Place in Best Project: Biological Science (Junior Level Category) and BEST OF THE BEST PROJECT Award (Junior Level Category). The team was mentored under the direction of their research adviser, Apple Grace D. Aberia, all throughout their winning streaks.

Bayugan National Comprehensive High School has also made its name in the field of Oratorical Contest in the national level as it won the Third Grand Prize in the 4th Bangko Sentral ng Pilipinas-DepEd Oratorical Competition held at BSP Building, Malate, Metro Manila. Mr. Delfin Cabaron-Fernandez was the first-ever teacher-coach of the school who made it this far.

The Special Program in Journalism or also known as SPJ one of the curriculum programs offered by BNCHS has also contributed much to the honor and prestige Bayugan City Division has achieved over the years. The Horizon School Paper Adviser was adjudged National Outstanding School Paper Adviser in 2015.

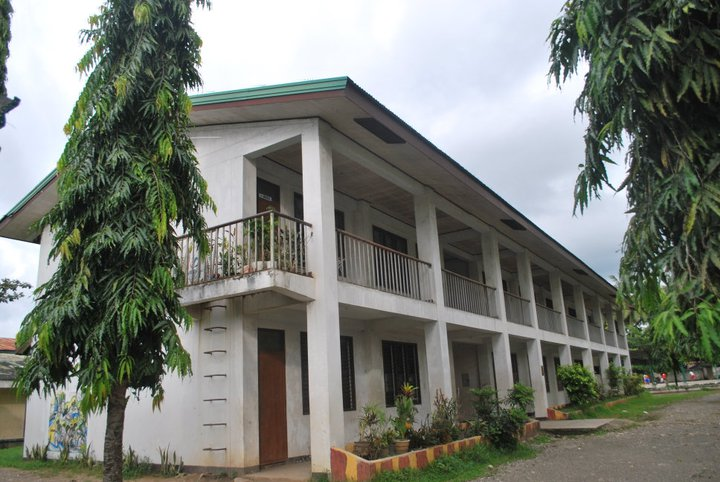
The Bayugan National Comprehensive High School Science Building.

BNCHS SPJ students have also won numerous awards in TV Broadcasting and Radio Broadcasting & Scriptwriting in the National level. The school news anchor in Radio Broadcasting, was also adjudged National Outstanding Campus Journalist in 2014.

In the National Inventor's Week 2006, sponsored by the Technology Application and Promotion Institute (TAPI) of the Department of Science and Technology (DOST), on November 13–17. 2006, the top prize for the Outstanding Student Creative Research (or Sibol Award) for high school was garnered. The Filipino-Chinese Chamber of Commerce Most Promising Invention Award and WIPO International Gold Medal Award were both given as special awards. A month before, the awardee became the first high school student to become a sub-plenary speaker in the Samahang Pisika ng Visayas at Mindanao (SPVM) National Physics Conference and Workshop. Also declared the champion in the individual category of the 10th Intel Philippines Science Fair.

BNCHS produced two Honourable Mentions in the First Step to Nobel Prize in Physics.

== Academics ==
Bayugan National Comprehensive High School conducts an entrance examination in order to determine the students to be part of its STE (Science, Technology, & Engineering Program), Special Program in Arts, Special Program in Sports and Special Program in Journalism curriculum.

== Hymn ==
Bayugan National Comprehensive High School Alma Mater Song

We gladly sing to thee

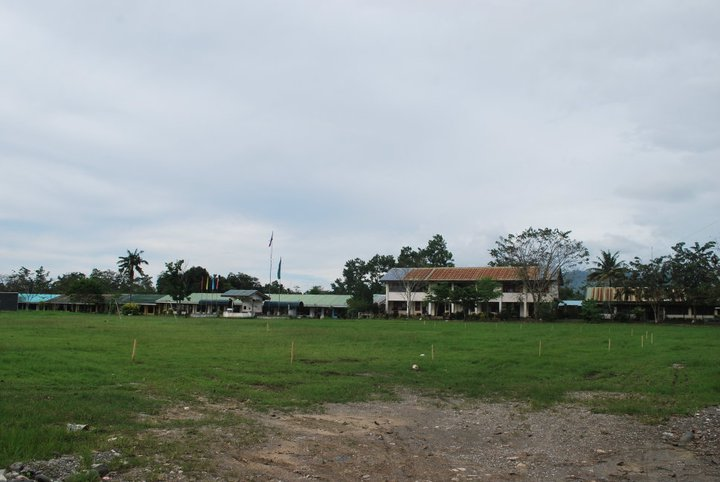
The Bayugan National Comprehensive High School, School Ground.

Our dear Alma Mater

With pride we love to tell

Thy triumphs do prevail

The years we've been with thee

The better we've become

Thy light beams on our way

Leading to victory

Oh dear Alma Mater

Bayugan National

Comprehensive High School,

Thy name our hearts revere

Today until the end

This banner we uphold

As we march towards the goal

We always pledge to thee

The honor and loyalty

CODA: We Always Pledge To Thee

The Honor and Loyalty

== Notable students ==
- Dani Dixon — participant in ABS-CBN's The Voice Teens Philippines Season 2
