= Agusan del Norte's 2nd congressional district =

House of Representatives of the Philippines legislative district

- Former constituency for the House of Representatives of the Philippines
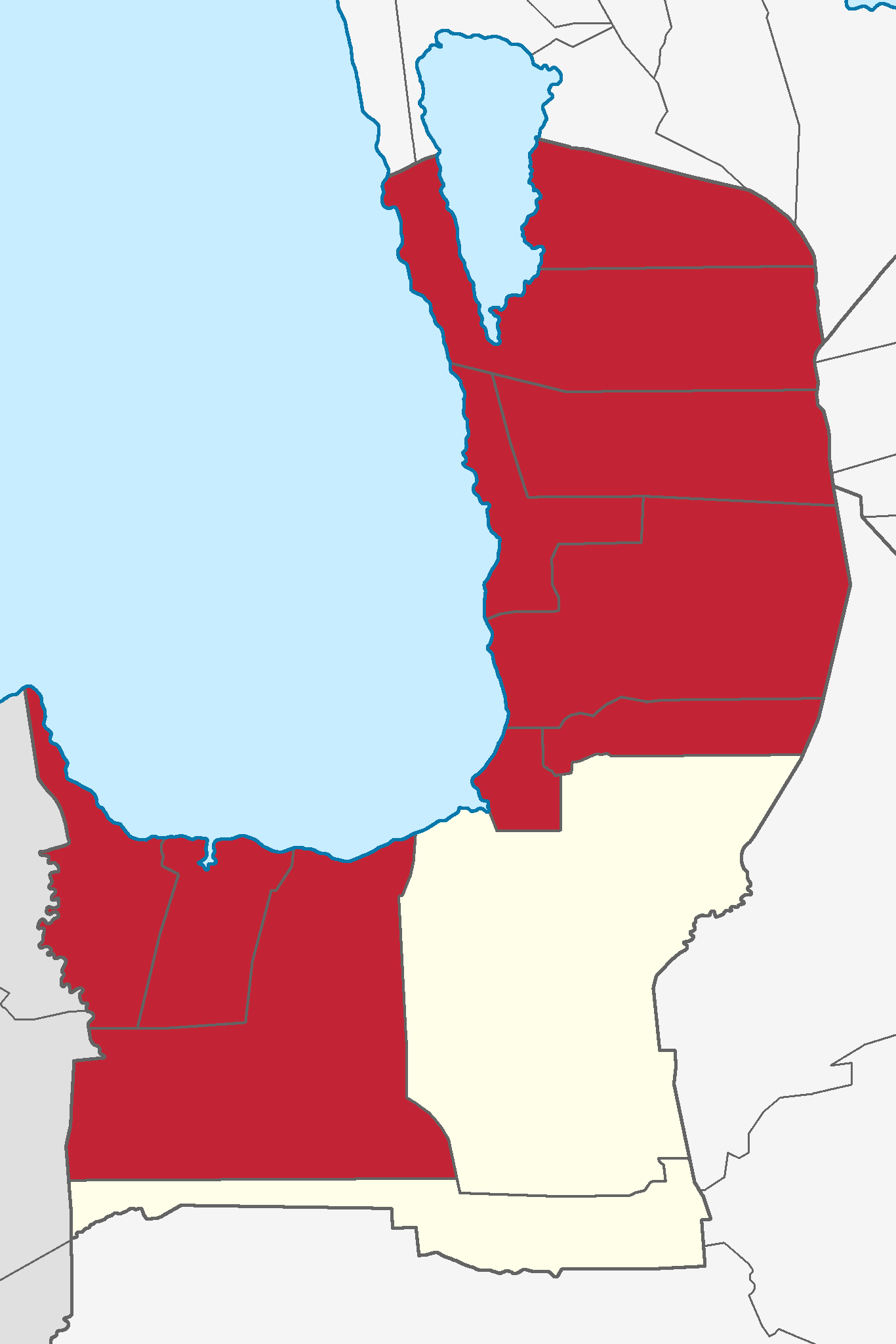
- Map of Agusan del Norte's 2nd congressional district

- Location of Agusan del Norte within the Philippines
- Province: Agusan del Norte
- Region: Caraga
- Population: 357,263 (2020)
- Electorate: 255,207 (2022)
- Major settlements: 10 LGUs: Cities; Cabadbaran; Municipalities; Buenavista; Carmen; Jabonga; Kitcharao; Magallanes; Nasipit; Remedios T. Romualdez; Santiago; Tubay
- Area: 2,147.55 km^{2} (829.17 sq mi)

Former constituency
- Created: 1987
- Abolished: 2025

Agusan del Norte's 2nd congressional district was a congressional district for the House of Representatives of the Philippines in the province of Agusan del Norte. It was one of only two districts in the province in existence from 1987 to 2025. The district consisted of two noncontiguous parts bordering Butuan Bay with the 1st district situated between the two. The northern portion covered the city of Cabadbaran and the municipalities of Jabonga, Kitcharao, Magallanes, Remedios T. Romualdez, Santiago and Tubay, while the municipalities of Buenavista, Carmen and Nasipit comprised its western section. The district was dissolved in 2025 following the creation of Butuan's at-large congressional district, redistricting all constituencies to the province's restored at-large district.

== List of members representing the district ==
=== House of Representatives (1987–present) ===
No.	Portrait	Member	Term of office		Legislature	Party	Electoral history	Constituent LGUs
No.	Portrait	Member	Start	End	Legislature	Party	Electoral history	Constituent LGUs
District created February 2, 1987 from Agusan del Norte's at-large district.
1		Edelmiro Amante	June 30, 1987	September 14, 1992	8th Congress	UNIDO	Elected in 1987.	1987–2025 Buenavista, Cabadbaran, Carmen, Jabonga, Kitcharao, Magallanes, Nasipit, Remedios T. Romualdez, Santiago, Tubay
1		Edelmiro Amante	June 30, 1987	September 14, 1992	8th Congress	Nacionalista	Elected in 1987.	1987–2025 Buenavista, Cabadbaran, Carmen, Jabonga, Kitcharao, Magallanes, Nasipit, Remedios T. Romualdez, Santiago, Tubay
1		Edelmiro Amante	June 30, 1987	September 14, 1992	9th Congress	Lakas	Re-elected in 1992. Resigned on appointment as Executive Secretary.	1987–2025 Buenavista, Cabadbaran, Carmen, Jabonga, Kitcharao, Magallanes, Nasipit, Remedios T. Romualdez, Santiago, Tubay
Vacant			September 14, 1992	September 6, 1993	9th Congress	—	Eduardo Rama Sr. designated as caretaker.	1987–2025 Buenavista, Cabadbaran, Carmen, Jabonga, Kitcharao, Magallanes, Nasipit, Remedios T. Romualdez, Santiago, Tubay
(1)		Edelmiro Amante	September 6, 1993	June 30, 1995	9th Congress	Lakas	Re-elected in 1993 to finish his term.	1987–2025 Buenavista, Cabadbaran, Carmen, Jabonga, Kitcharao, Magallanes, Nasipit, Remedios T. Romualdez, Santiago, Tubay
2		Eduardo Rama Sr.	June 30, 1995	June 30, 1998	10th Congress	Lakas	Elected in 1995.	1987–2025 Buenavista, Cabadbaran, Carmen, Jabonga, Kitcharao, Magallanes, Nasipit, Remedios T. Romualdez, Santiago, Tubay
3		Roan Libarios	June 30, 1998	June 30, 2001	11th Congress	LAMMP	Elected in 1998.	1987–2025 Buenavista, Cabadbaran, Carmen, Jabonga, Kitcharao, Magallanes, Nasipit, Remedios T. Romualdez, Santiago, Tubay
(1)		Edelmiro Amante	June 30, 2001	June 30, 2004	12th Congress	Lakas	Elected in 2001.	1987–2025 Buenavista, Cabadbaran, Carmen, Jabonga, Kitcharao, Magallanes, Nasipit, Remedios T. Romualdez, Santiago, Tubay
4		Angelica Amante	June 30, 2004	June 30, 2007	13th Congress	Lakas	Elected in 2004.	1987–2025 Buenavista, Cabadbaran, Carmen, Jabonga, Kitcharao, Magallanes, Nasipit, Remedios T. Romualdez, Santiago, Tubay
(1)		Edelmiro Amante	June 30, 2007	June 30, 2010	14th Congress	KAMPI	Elected in 2007.	1987–2025 Buenavista, Cabadbaran, Carmen, Jabonga, Kitcharao, Magallanes, Nasipit, Remedios T. Romualdez, Santiago, Tubay
(1)		Edelmiro Amante	June 30, 2007	June 30, 2010	14th Congress	Lakas	Elected in 2007.	1987–2025 Buenavista, Cabadbaran, Carmen, Jabonga, Kitcharao, Magallanes, Nasipit, Remedios T. Romualdez, Santiago, Tubay
(4)		Angelica Amante	June 30, 2010	June 30, 2013	15th Congress	Liberal	Elected in 2010.	1987–2025 Buenavista, Cabadbaran, Carmen, Jabonga, Kitcharao, Magallanes, Nasipit, Remedios T. Romualdez, Santiago, Tubay
5		Erlpe John Amante	June 30, 2013	June 30, 2019	16th Congress	Independent	Elected in 2013.	1987–2025 Buenavista, Cabadbaran, Carmen, Jabonga, Kitcharao, Magallanes, Nasipit, Remedios T. Romualdez, Santiago, Tubay
5		Erlpe John Amante	June 30, 2013	June 30, 2019	17th Congress	Nacionalista	Re-elected in 2016.	1987–2025 Buenavista, Cabadbaran, Carmen, Jabonga, Kitcharao, Magallanes, Nasipit, Remedios T. Romualdez, Santiago, Tubay
(4)		Angelica Amante	June 30, 2019	June 30, 2022	18th Congress	PDP–Laban	Elected in 2019.	1987–2025 Buenavista, Cabadbaran, Carmen, Jabonga, Kitcharao, Magallanes, Nasipit, Remedios T. Romualdez, Santiago, Tubay
6		Dale Corvera	June 30, 2022	June 30, 2025	19th Congress	PDP–Laban	Elected in 2022. Redistricted to the at-large district.	1987–2025 Buenavista, Cabadbaran, Carmen, Jabonga, Kitcharao, Magallanes, Nasipit, Remedios T. Romualdez, Santiago, Tubay
6		Dale Corvera	June 30, 2022	June 30, 2025	19th Congress	Lakas	Elected in 2022. Redistricted to the at-large district.	1987–2025 Buenavista, Cabadbaran, Carmen, Jabonga, Kitcharao, Magallanes, Nasipit, Remedios T. Romualdez, Santiago, Tubay
District dissolved into Agusan del Norte's at-large district.

== Election results ==
=== 1992 ===
1992 Philippine House of Representatives election in Agusan del Norte
Party	Candidate	Votes	%
Lakas	Edelmiro Amante (incumbent)	42,074	59.74
LDP/Independent	Roberto Aquino	22,576	32.06
Independent	Soledad Cagampang-de Castro	5,773	8.20
Total votes		70,423	100.00
Lakas hold			

=== 1993 special ===
1993 Philippine House of Representatives special election in Agusan del Norte's 2nd district
Party	Candidate	Votes	%
Lakas	Edelmiro Amante	67,155	100.00
Total votes		67,155	100.00
Lakas hold			

=== 1995 ===
1995 Philippine House of Representatives election in Agusan del Norte
Party	Candidate	Votes	%
Lakas	Eduardo Rama Sr.	44,048	60.20
LDP	Roberto Aquino	29,119	39.80
Total votes		73,167	100.00
LDP hold			

=== 1998 ===
1998 Philippine House of Representatives election in Agusan del Norte
Party	Candidate	Votes	%
LAMMP	Roan Libarios	48,623	53.59
Lakas	Eduardo Rama Sr. (incumbent)	42,029	46.32
Independent	Gerardo Quiamjot	83	0.09
Total votes		90,735	100.00
LAMMP gain from Lakas			

=== 2010 ===
2010 Philippine House of Representatives election in Agusan del Norte
Party	Candidate	Votes	%
Lakas–Kampi	Angelica Amante (incumbent)	97,196	70.11
Independent	Jovitte Calo	40,715	29.37
Independent	Jorge Lomongsod	388	0.28
Independent	Van Amelio Fudalan	336	0.24
Valid ballots		138,635	93.40
Invalid or blank votes		9,792	6.60
Total votes		148,427	100.00
Lakas–Kampi hold			

=== 2022 ===
2022 Philippine House of Representatives election in Agusan del Norte
Party	Candidate	Votes	%
PDP–Laban	Dale Corvera	145,947	78.75
PRP	Inday Atenta	39,385	21.25
Valid ballots		185,332	85.80
Invalid or blank votes		30,678	14.20
Total votes		216,010	100.00
PDP–Laban hold			

== See also ==
- Legislative districts of Agusan del Norte
