= Agusan del Norte Provincial Board =

Legislative body of the province of Agusan del Norte, Philippines

Agusan del Norte Provincial Board Sangguniang Panlalawigan ng Agusan del Norte

Type
- Type: Unicameral
- Term limits: 3 terms (9 years)

Leadership
- Presiding Officer: Enrico R. Corvera, PDP–Laban since June 30, 2022

Structure
- Seats: 14 board members 1 ex officio presiding officer
- Political groups: PDP–Laban (9) Independent (2) Nonpartisan (3)
- Length of term: 3 years
- Authority: Local Government Code of the Philippines

Elections
- Voting system: Plurality-at-large (regular members); Indirect election (ex officio members); Acclamation (sectoral member)
- Last election: May 12, 2025
- Next election: May 15, 2028

Meeting place
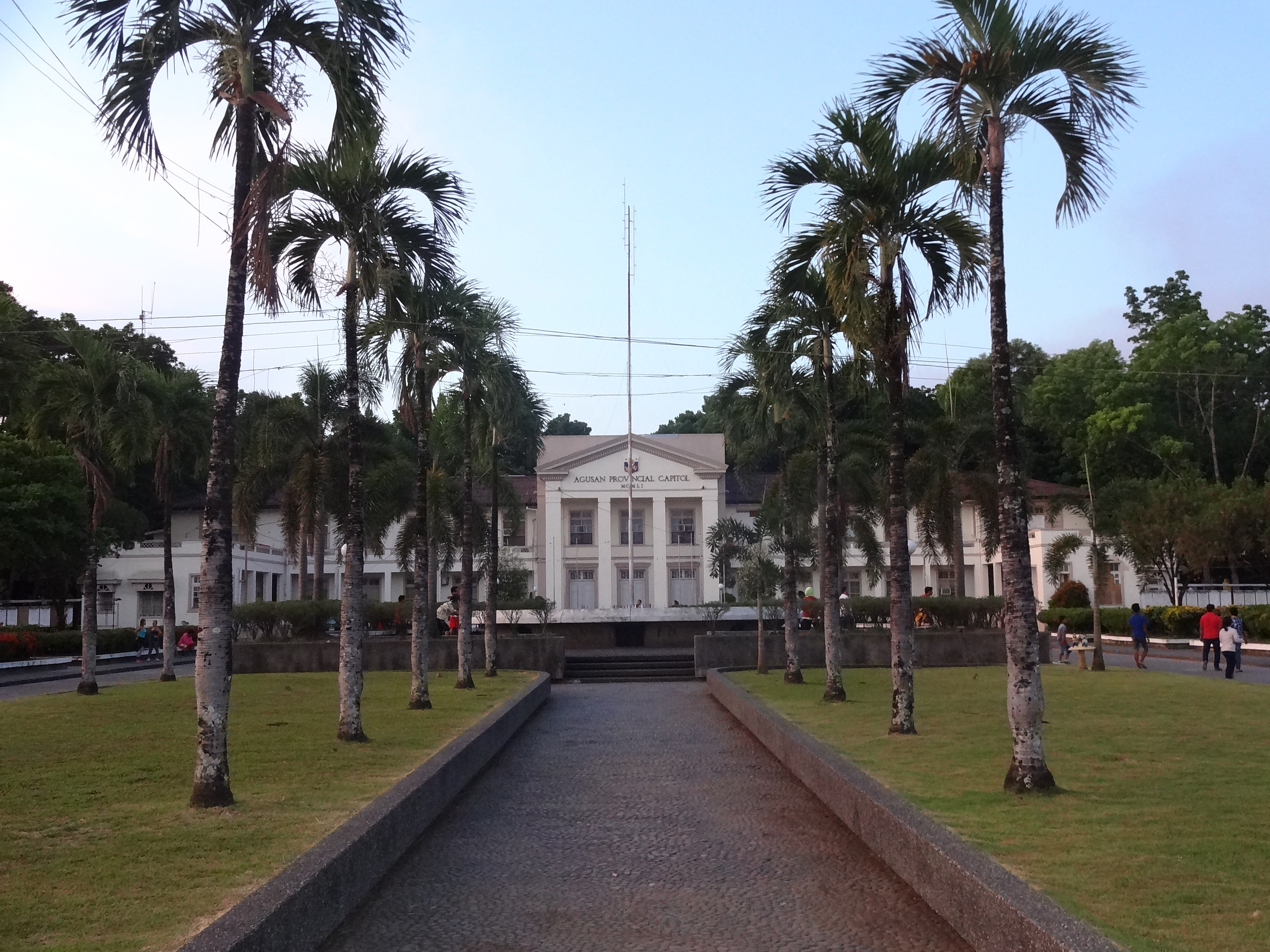
- Agusan Provincial Capitol, Butuan

The Agusan del Norte Provincial Board is the Sangguniang Panlalawigan (provincial legislature) of the Philippine province of Agusan del Norte.

The members are elected via plurality-at-large voting: the province is divided into two districts, one sending one member and the other sending seven members to the provincial board; the electorate votes the number of seats allocated for their district, with the candidates with the highest number of votes (first in the first district and the first seven in the second) being elected. The vice governor is the ex officio presiding officer, and only votes to break ties. The vice governor is elected via the plurality voting system throughout the province.

== District apportionment ==
Elections	No. of seats per district		Ex officio seats	Reserved seats	Total seats
Elections	1st	2nd	Ex officio seats	Reserved seats	Total seats
2004	1	9	3	—	13
2007–2021	1	7	3	—	11
2021–2025	1	7	3	1	12
2025–present	5	5	3	1	14

=== Redistricting changes ===
Identical to the Legislative districts of Agusan del Norte, only that the highly urbanized city of Butuan is excluded for the purposes of provincial board representation.

- 1st District: Buenavista, Carmen, Las Nieves, Nasipit
- 2nd District: Cabadbaran, Jabonga, Kitcharao, Magallanes, Remedios T. Romualdez, Santiago, Tubay

== List of members ==
=== Current members ===
These are the members after the 2025 local elections and 2023 barangay and SK elections:

- Vice Governor: Enrico R. Corvera (PDP–Laban)

Seat	Board member	Party	Start of term	End of term
1st district	Ryan Jade D. Lim	PDP–Laban	June 30, 2022	June 30, 2028
1st district	Nieva C. Famador	PDP–Laban	June 30, 2019	June 30, 2028
1st district	Rey G. Jamboy	PDP–Laban	June 30, 2025	June 30, 2028
1st district	Alan M. Asio	Independent	June 30, 2025	June 30, 2028
1st district	Randy P. Catarman	Independent	June 30, 2025	June 30, 2028
2nd district	Francisco Y. Chan Jr.	PDP–Laban	June 30, 2019	June 30, 2028
2nd district	James T. Reserva	PDP–Laban	June 30, 2019	June 30, 2028
2nd district	Erwin L. Dano	PDP–Laban	June 30, 2019	June 30, 2028
2nd district	Virgilio R. Escasiñas	PDP–Laban	June 30, 2019	June 30, 2028
2nd district	Rodulfo A. Pitogo	PDP–Laban	June 30, 2019	June 30, 2028
ABC	Benjamin Lim, Jr.	Nonpartisan	July 30, 2018	January 1, 2023
PCL	Inez Rosario A. Amante	PDP–Laban		June 30, 2028
SK	Gea Abby Gail J. Rizon	Nonpartisan		
IPMR	Hawudon Armando H. Una	Nonpartisan	July 1, 2025	

=== Vice governor ===
Election year	Name	Party	Ref.
2001	Roberto Tejano		
2004	Dale Corvera	Lakas	
2007	Enrico Corvera	KAMPI	
2010	Enrico Corvera	Lakas–Kampi	
2013	Ramon Bungabong	Liberal	
2016	Ramon Bungabong	Liberal	
2019	Ramon Bungabong	PDP–Laban	
2022	Enrico R. Corvera	PDP–Laban	
2025	Enrico R. Corvera	PDP–Laban	

=== 1st District ===
Election year	Member (party)	Member (party)	Member (party)	Member (party)	Member (party)	Ref.
2004	Virgilio Escasiñas (Liberal)	—				
2007	Francisco Rosales (KAMPI)	—				
2010	Fortunato Rosales (Lakas-Kampi)	—				
2013	Virgilio Escasiñas, Jr. (PMP)	—				
2016	Virgilio Escasiñas, Jr. (Liberal)	—				
2019	Virgilio Escasiñas, Jr. (PDP–Laban)	—				
2022	Larry Bautista (PDP–Laban)	—				
2025	Ryan Jade D. Lim (PDP–Laban)	Nieva C. Famador (PDP–Laban)	Rey G. Jamboy (PDP–Laban)	Alan M. Asio (Independent)	Randy P. Catarman (Independent)	

=== 2nd District ===
Election year	Member (party)	Member (party)	Member (party)	Member (party)	Member (party)	Ref.
2004	Ernie Ceniza (Lakas)	Rogelio Dagani (Lakas)	Alan Famador (Lakas)	Venerando Atupan (Lakas)	Sadeka Tomaneng (Lakas)	
2004	Aquino Gambe (Liberal)	Arcedel Libarios (Liberal)	Andres Tan (Lakas)	Sunny Ago (Liberal)	—	
2007	James Reserva (KAMPI)	Rogelio Dagani (KAMPI)	Alan Famador (KAMPI)	Venerando Atupan (KAMPI)	Sadeka Tomaneng (KAMPI)	
2007	Aquino Gambe	Rey Jamboy (KAMPI)	—			
2010	James Reserva (Lakas-Kampi)	Daniel Racaza (Lakas-Kampi)	Rodulfo Pitogo (Lakas-Kampi)	Lorito Maragañas (Lakas-Kampi)	Joseph Tomaneng (Lakas-Kampi)	
2010	Aquino Gambe (Lakas-Kampi)	Rey Jamboy (Lakas-Kampi)	—			
2013	James Reserva (Liberal)	Elizabeth Calo (Liberal)	Rodulfo Pitogo (Liberal)	Antidio Amora (Liberal)	Joseph Tomaneng (Liberal)	
2013	Danny Goran (Liberal)	Rey Jamboy (Liberal)	—			
2016	Salutario Cuasito (Nacionalista)	Elizabeth Calo (Liberal)	Dick Victor Carmona (Nacionalista)	Lorito Maragañas (Nacionalista)	Lucia Espina-Jundis (Nacionalista)	
2016	Aquino Gambe (Liberal)	Daniel Racaza (Nacionalista)	—			
2019	James Reserva (PDP–Laban)	Elizabeth Calo (PDP–Laban)	Rodulfo Pitogo (PDP–Laban)	Francisco Chan, Jr. (PDP–Laban)	Dick Victor Carmona (PDP–Laban)	
2019	Nieva Famador (PDP–Laban)	Erwin Dano (PDP–Laban)	—			
2022	James Reserva (PDP–Laban)	Ryan Jade Lim (PDP–Laban)	Rodulfo Pitogo (PDP–Laban)	Francisco Chan, Jr. (PDP–Laban)	Dick Victor Carmona (PDP–Laban)	
2022	Nieva Famador (PDP–Laban)	Erwin Dano (PDP–Laban)	—			
2025	Francisco Y. Chan Jr. (PDP–Laban)	James T. Reserva (PDP–Laban)	Erwin L. Dano (PDP–Laban)	Virgilio R. Escasiñas (PDP–Laban)	Rodulfo A. Pitogo (PDP–Laban)	
