= Edelmiro Amante =

Filipino politician

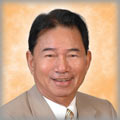
- Official portrait, 2007

Member of the Philippine House of Representatives from Agusan del Norte's 2nd District
- In office June 30, 2007 – June 30, 2010
- Preceded by: Angelica Amante
- Succeeded by: Angelica Amante
- In office June 30, 2001 – June 30, 2004
- Preceded by: Roan Libarios
- Succeeded by: Angelica Amante
- In office September 6, 1993 – June 30, 1995
- Preceded by: Vacant
- Succeeded by: Eduardo L. Rama Sr.
- In office June 30, 1987 – September 14, 1992
- Preceded by: Post created
- Succeeded by: Vacant

27th Executive Secretary of the Philippines
- In office September 14, 1992 – June 30, 1993
- President: Fidel V. Ramos
- Preceded by: Peter Garrucho
- Succeeded by: Teofisto Guingona Jr.

Mambabatas Pambansa (Assemblyman) from Agusan del Norte
- In office June 30, 1984 – March 25, 1986

Mambabatas Pambansa (Assemblyman) from Region X
- In office June 12, 1978 – June 5, 1984

Member of the Butuan City Council
- In office 1960–1964

Barrio Lieutenant of Ampayon, Butuan
- In office 1959

Personal details
- Born: April 21, 1933 Butuan, Agusan, Philippine Islands
- Died: March 10, 2013 (aged 79) Philippines
- Party: Lakas (2001-2013)
- Other political affiliations: KAMPI (1997–2008); Nacionalista (1984–1997); KBL (1978–1984)
- Education: Silliman University

Edelmiro Atega Amante Sr. (April 21, 1933 – March 10, 2013), was a Filipino politician.

== Early life and education ==
Amante was born in Butuan. He attended Ampayon Elementary School and then Mindanao Institute, where he graduated from high school as a salutatorian. He then studied at Silliman University, where he received an Associate in Arts degree in 1954, then a Bachelor of Laws in 1958.

== Political career ==
Amante started his career as a barrio lieutenant in Ampayon, Butuan. He held that position for only one year, 1959, before becoming a Councilor from 1960 to 1964. He represented Agusan del Norte at the 1973 Constitutional Convention. He had also represented Agusan del Norte as an Assemblyman of the defunct Batasang Pambansa from 1978 to 1984. Since 1984, he was elected to four terms to the House of Representatives representing the 2nd District of Agusan del Norte. He was most recently elected in 2007, succeeding his daughter Angelica.

Amante was a close ally of President Fidel V. Ramos, under whose administration he served as the Executive Secretary from 1992 to 1993 when he decided to return to Congress through a special election, where he ran unopposed. Prior to his death, he was a member of the KAMPI party.
