= Carmen, Agusan del Norte =

Municipality in Agusan del Norte, Philippines

Carmen
- Municipality
- Municipality of Carmen
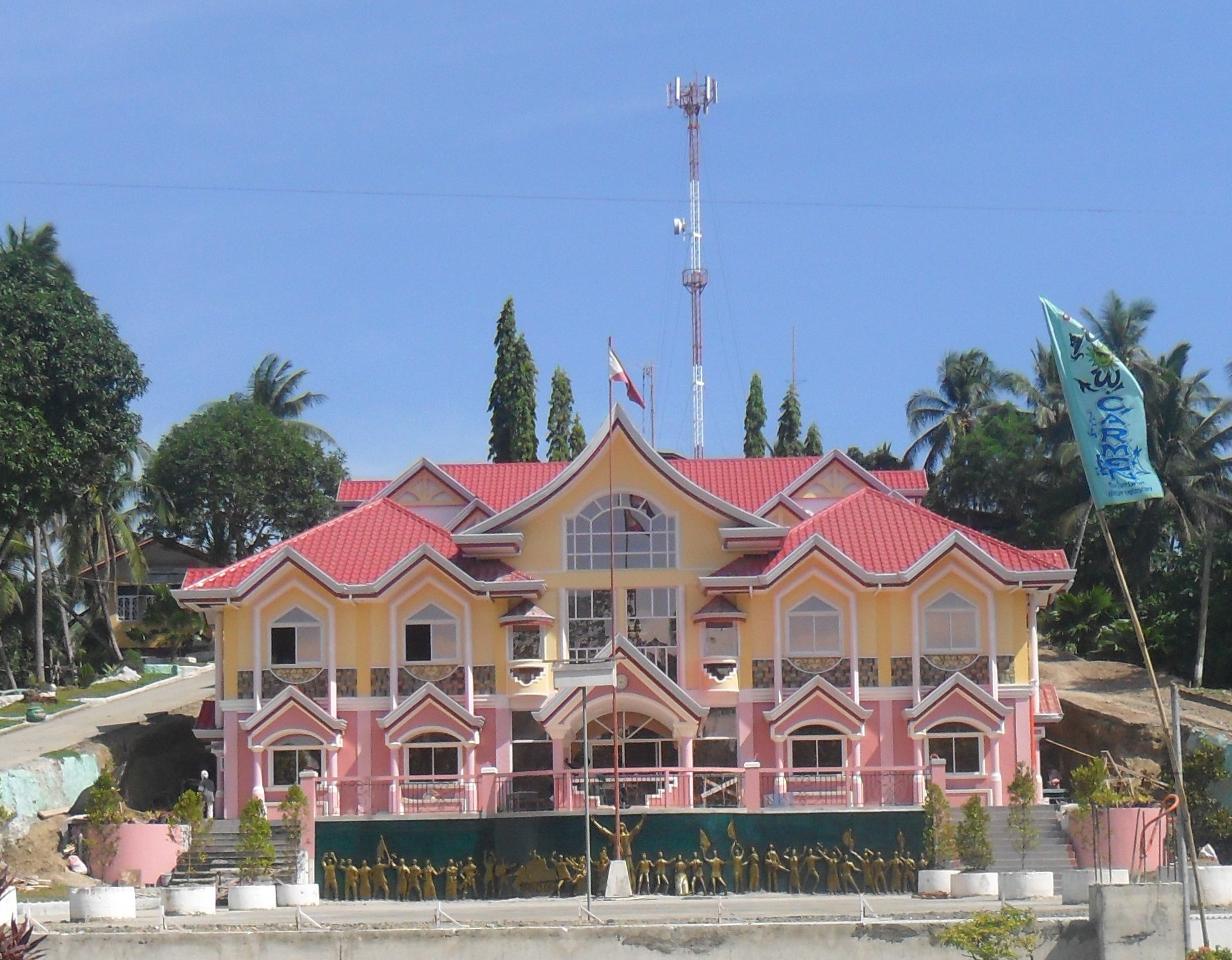
- Municipal Hall

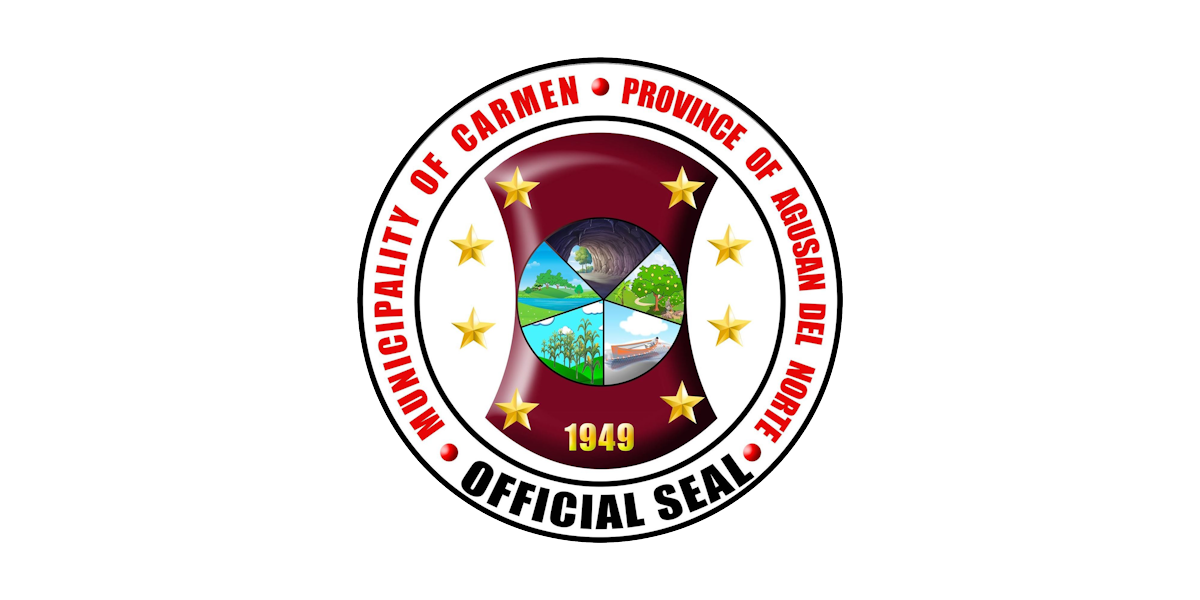
- Flag Seal

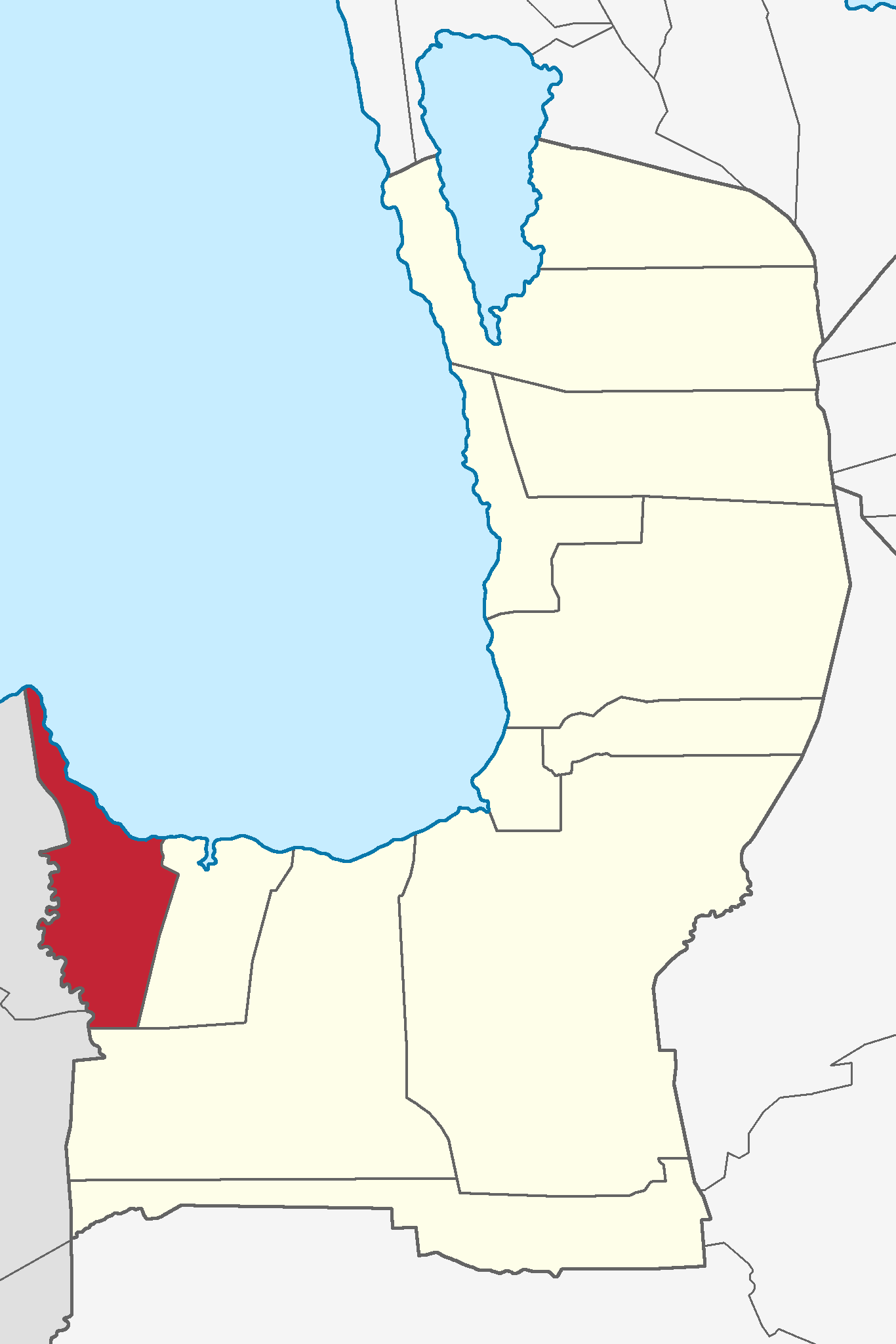
- Map of Agusan del Norte with Carmen highlighted
- Interactive map of Carmen
- Location within the Philippines
- Coordinates: 9°00′N 125°16′E
- Country: Philippines
- Region: Caraga
- Province: Agusan del Norte
- District: Lone district
- Founded: July 1, 1949
- Barangays: 8 (see Barangays)

Government
  - Type: Sangguniang Bayan
  - Mayor: Jovitte C. Calo
  - Vice Mayor: Ramon M. Calo
  - Representative: Dale Corvera
  - Municipal Council: Members: Erma R. Estoque; Corazon T. Alpuerto; Gilda A. Samaco; Maria Riza P. Ledesma; Eva D. Palarca; Julius S. Tamayo; Abraham R. dela Cruz Jr.; Romel Jhun C. Ledesma
  - Electorate: 15,408 voters (2025)

Area
  - Total: 311.02 km^{2} (120.09 sq mi)
- Elevation: 56 m (184 ft)
- Highest elevation: 330 m (1,080 ft)
- Lowest elevation: 0 m (0 ft)

Population (2024 census)
  - Total: 23,304
  - Density: 74.928/km^{2} (194.06/sq mi)
  - Households: 5,874

Economy
  - Income class: 3rd municipal income class
  - Poverty incidence: 24.69% (2023)
  - Revenue: ₱ 167.2 million (2024)
  - Assets: ₱ 417.2 million (2024)
  - Expenditure: ₱ 77.98 million (2024)
  - Liabilities: ₱ 69.71 million (2024)

Service provider
  - Electricity: Agusan del Norte Electric Cooperative (ANECO)
- Time zone: UTC+8 (PST)
- ZIP code: 8603
- PSGC: 1600204000
- IDD : area code: +63 (0)85
- Native languages: Agusan; Butuanon; Cebuano; Higaonon; Tagalog
- Website: www.carmenadn.gov.ph

Carmen, officially the Municipality of Carmen (Cebuano: Lungsod sa Carmen; Tagalog: Bayan ng Carmen), is a municipality in the province of Agusan del Norte, Philippines. According to the 2024 census, it has a population of 23,304 people.

== History ==
The first Christian settlers of Kabayawa village (now Carmen) was the family of Fulgencio Loque and Demetria Mamba from Jagna, Bohol in the early 1900s. The family encounters of the native Manobo and Higaonon tribes of Mankalasi clan was not that difficult as they were friendly. Day to day's trade was done through a barter system wherein goods and services were directly exchanged for other goods and services without using any money and through this “system”, parcels of lands were also being acquired.

In earlier times, parcels of land were marked by planting moringa trees at their corners to define boundaries. During the Spanish period, these markers were replaced with concrete boundary posts known as mohons.

News of the area’s abundance spread among the relatives of early settlers, prompting an influx of migrants from Luzon and various parts of the Visayas. The Loque and Mamba families settled in what is now the poblacion, while other families—including the Pacon, Quesaba, Honcolada, and Malimit—established communities in the surrounding eastern, western, and southern areas. Further west, the Rojales and Jamito families formed their own settlements, while the Ebarle, Jamero, Sajor, and Salas families settled in Tagcatong, and the Balmoceda family in Goso-on.

Carmen got its present name from the miraculous image of the Virgin of Mount Carmen, believed to have been instrumental in killing the leader of the bandits who used to inhabit the place.

According to local accounts, a Spanish soldier named Juan Cardoniga attempted to shoot an outlaw leader believed to possess a protective amulet. When his rifle failed to fire, he placed an image of the Virgin from his necklace into the barrel. After doing so, the rifle discharged successfully, and he was able to kill the outlaw chief.

It was Rev. Saturnino Urios, the famous Jesuit priest of Agusan, who suggested that the name Kabayawa be changed to Carmen in honor of the secret image.

Carmen was created into a municipality in 1949, when the barrios of Carmen, Tagcatong, Cahayagan and San Agustin were separated from the municipality of Nasipit and constituted into the newly created town, by virtue of Republic Act No. 380 which was approved on June 15, 1949. This law was sponsored by Congressman Marcos M. Calo. The town came into being on July 1, 1949.

In 1988, Mayor Tranquilino O. Calo Jr. was charged with murder for the assassination of former Nasipit mayor Mariano Corvera Sr. by Pablo Macapas, an alleged bodyguard of Calo, in a courtroom within the Capitol Building of Butuan on March 10, 1988. The assassination occurred upon the adjournment of a hearing on Macapas' attempted murder of Corvera in 1985, with Calo serving as Macapas' counsel. Charged alongside Mayor Calo was Macapas, Calo's driver Bellarmino Allocod, and two others, with eyewitnesses later testifying that Calo was the person who handed Macapas a handgun prior to the latter reentering the courtroom and shooting Corvera. While Macapas was never caught, Mayor Calo and Allocod were later found guilty of murder by an RTC in March 1990, but pending his appeal before the Supreme Court, Calo died of myocardial infarction in February 1993, while the court later reversed Allocod's conviction by 1996 due to the prosecution's failure to prove his guilt beyond reasonable doubt.

== Geography ==
According to the Philippine Statistics Authority, the municipality has a land area of 311.02 square kilometres (120.09 sq mi) constituting 11.39% of the 2,730.24-square-kilometre- (1,054.15 sq mi) total area of Agusan del Norte.

Carmen is strategically located in the Western Agusan Corridor. It is bounded on the north by Butuan Bay, south by Buenavista, east by Nasipit and west by Misamis Oriental. Its rolling hills are planted with different kinds of orchard, where some 500 hectares (1,200 acres) are devoted solely to mango plantations. About half of these are fully developed and are already producing sweet mango fruits which are being sold in volume in Cebu and Manila and to neighboring municipalities and Butuan City.

=== Climate ===
Climate data for Carmen, Agusan del Norte
Month	Jan	Feb	Mar	Apr	May	Jun	Jul	Aug	Sep	Oct	Nov	Dec	Year
Mean daily maximum °C (°F)	27 (81)	28 (82)	28 (82)	30 (86)	30 (86)	30 (86)	30 (86)	30 (86)	30 (86)	30 (86)	29 (84)	28 (82)	29 (84)
Mean daily minimum °C (°F)	23 (73)	23 (73)	23 (73)	23 (73)	24 (75)	25 (77)	24 (75)	25 (77)	25 (77)	24 (75)	24 (75)	24 (75)	24 (75)
Average precipitation mm (inches)	277 (10.9)	211 (8.3)	155 (6.1)	109 (4.3)	166 (6.5)	191 (7.5)	154 (6.1)	138 (5.4)	127 (5.0)	173 (6.8)	241 (9.5)	231 (9.1)	2,173 (85.5)
Average rainy days	22.7	19.1	20.0	19.9	25.9	27.6	27.6	26.1	25.1	26.8	24.3	23.2	288.3
Source: Meteoblue (Use with caution: this is modeled/calculated data, not measured locally.)

=== Barangays ===
Carmen is politically subdivided into 8 barangays. Each barangay consists of puroks while some have sitios.

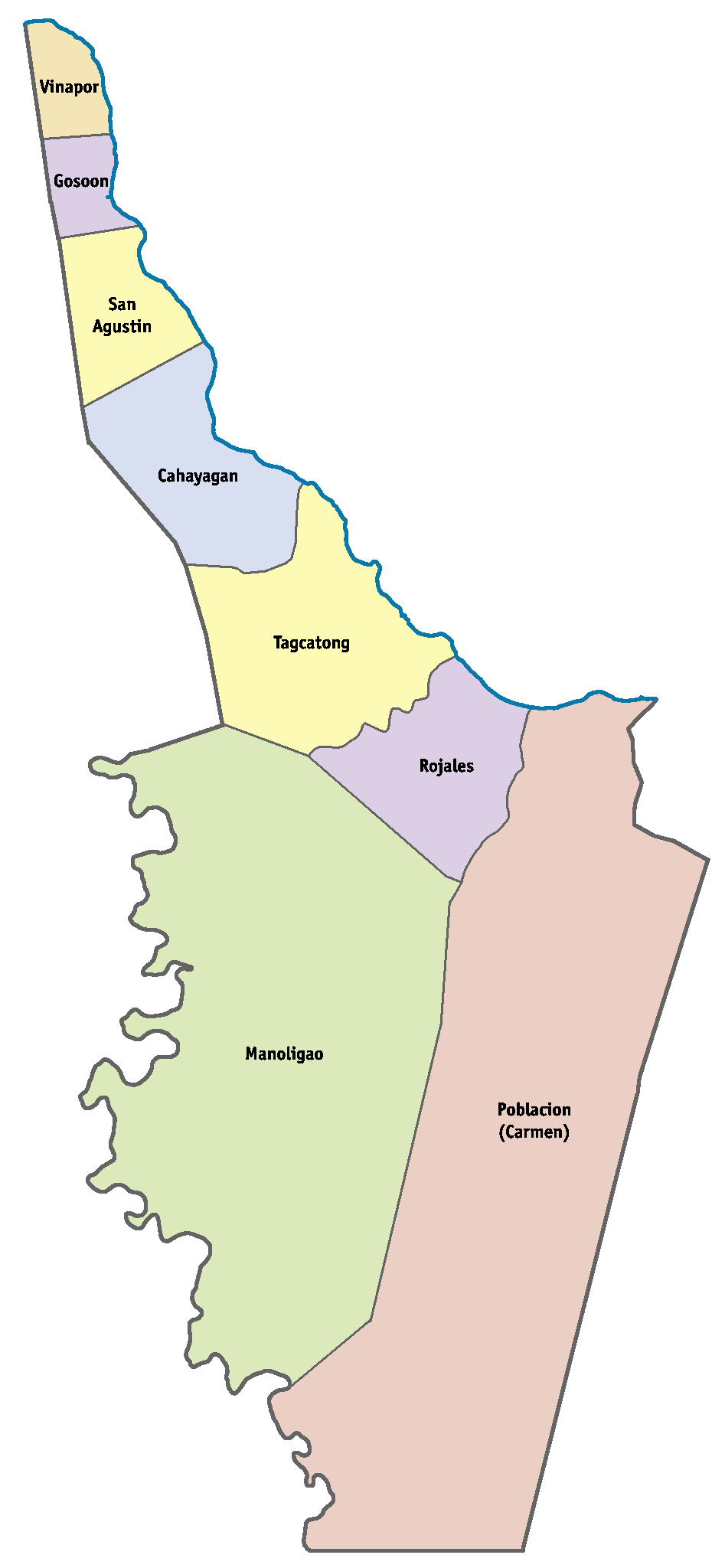
Political map of Carmen

PSGC	Barangay	Population			±% p.a.	
		2024		2010		
160204001	Cahayagan	10.3%	2,395	2,380	▴	0.04%
160204002	Gosoon	7.7%	1,806	1,772	▴	0.13%
160204004	Manoligao	5.8%	1,356	1,513	▾	−0.76%
160204009	Poblacion (Carmen)	25.7%	5,988	5,507	▴	0.58%
160204010	Rojales	10.9%	2,542	2,083	▴	1.39%
160204011	San Agustin	5.1%	1,183	1,117	▴	0.40%
160204012	Tagcatong	14.9%	3,462	3,382	▴	0.16%
160204014	Vinapor	9.0%	2,107	2,027	▴	0.27%
	Total		23,304	19,781	▴	1.15%

== Demographics ==
Population census of Carmen
Year	Pop.	±% p.a.
1960	9,593	—
1970	12,851	+2.96%
1975	13,882	+1.56%
1980	14,595	+1.01%
1990	15,503	+0.61%
1995	15,967	+0.55%
2000	17,307	+1.74%
2007	18,116	+0.63%
2010	19,781	+3.25%
2015	20,839	+1.00%
2020	23,172	+2.26%
2024	23,304	+0.14%
Source: Philippine Statistics Authority

In the 2024 census, Carmen had a population of 23,304. The population density was 75 inhabitants per square kilometre (190/sq mi).

== Economy ==
Poverty incidence of Carmen (%)

Source: Philippine Statistics Authority

== Government ==
Elected government officials of Carmen for the term of 2025-2028:

- Mayor: Ramon "Monching RMC" M. Calo
- Vice Mayor: Jovitte C. Calo
- Sangguniang Bayan:
  - Jesus Tranquilino R. Calo
  - Alfonso L. Elan Jr.
  - Richard O. Palang-at
  - Gilda A. Samaco
  - Romel Jhun C. Ledesma
  - Vivian S. Autor
  - Carmina Rasha G. Calo
  - Junjun R. Estoque
- SB Secretary:
  - Sharmaine P. Pacon

=== List of former mayors ===
- Honculada, Nicanor O. - 1949–1951
- De Guzman, Arturo - 1952–1955
- Malimit, Jose - 1956–1960, 1964-1967
- Degamo, Esteban - 1960–1963
- Calo, Tranquilino Jr. - 1968–1969, 1972–1985, 1988-1993
- Campos, Ernesto - 1969–1971
- Pacon, Dionesio - 1986–1987
- Aparecio, Joaquin - 1987
- Battad, Arnulfo - 1987 - 1988 (until January only)
- Luneta, Eliseo - 1993–1995
- Calo, Ramon - 1996–2004, 2007–present
- Calo, Jovitte - 2004–2007

== Tourism ==
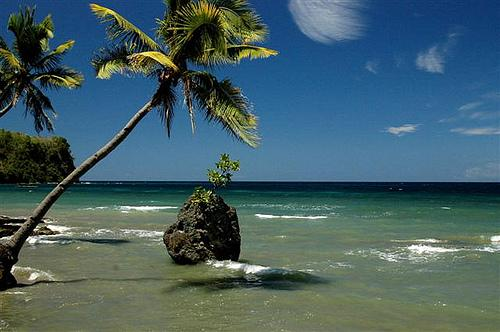
Bolihon Beach

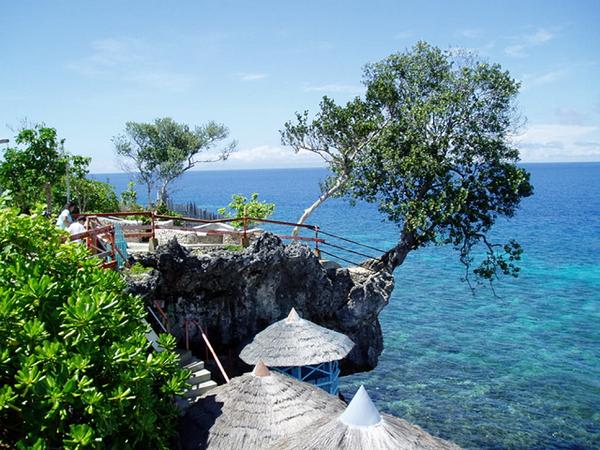
Punta Diwata Cave

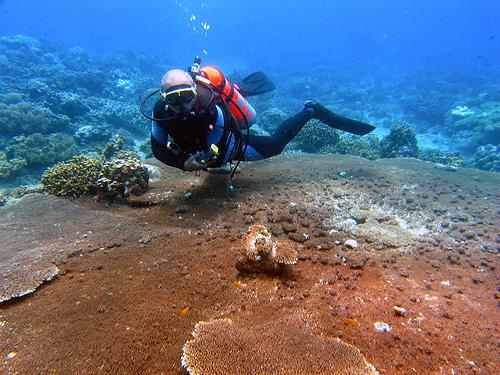
Punta Diwata Reef

- Carmen Municipal Hall: new municipal hall officially opened on July 1, 2011.
- Plaza Beach Resort: beach covered with white sands in its coast located at Sitio Bulihon, Barangay Tagcatong.
- Mount Carmel View Park: park commonly called by Carmenanons as "Marcos Park", located at San Isidro, Barangay Tagcatong. From here, one can view the entire Carmen and nearby municipalities, and the island province of Camiguin.
- Punta Diwata Cave: one of the popular destinations in Carmen consisting of 43 caves, located in Barangay Vinapor.
- Balite Beach Resort: located in Barangay Vinapor.
- Vinapor Blue Waters: located near the Cliffs of Barangay Vinapor, this resort features carved stones formed into a dinosaurs, a reason for it to be commonly called "Jurassic Park".
- Veranda I and II Resorts: a beach resort, hotel and convention venue located at Barangays Tagcatong and Rojales. It has air-conditioned rooms and suites, air conditioned cabañas and other facilities like cottages fronting beachfront, seafood and Chinese restaurants, mini-bar, convention hall and swimming pool.
- Scuba diving sites: Carmen is known for its adventurous dive sites along the Punta Diwata Reefs and Balete Wall. It has six dive sites. Reef life includes soft and hard corals plus abundant reef and pelagic fishes. Profile ranges from sloping wall to cliffs with depths from 40 ft. to over a hundred, with generally sandy floors. Prime sites are located in barangays Vinapor, Tagcatong & Poblacion.
- Cabatuan Beach
- Kibanlag Falls

== Transportation ==
In February 2017, the new integrated bus terminal was opened with buses for travel to and from Butuan and Cagayan de Oro.

Trisikad is also an option when traveling within the area of Carmen and also from the town proper to Nasipit.

== Education ==
=== Elementary ===
- Antonio Quiamjot Elementary School
- Cahayagan Elementary School
- Carmen Central Elementary School
- Cervantina Elementary School
- Doña Josefa Elementary School
- Elpidio Salas Elementary School
- Gosoon Elementary School
- Manoligao Elementary School
- Rojales Elementary School
- San Agustin Elementary School
- San Isidro Elementary School
- Tagcatong Central Elementary School

=== Secondary ===
- Carmen National High School
- Cahayagan National High School
- Manoligao National High School
- Our Lady of Carmen Academy of Caraga, Incorporated
- Vinapor National High School
