= Butuan Bay =

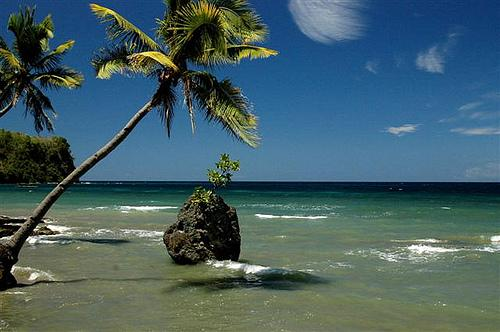
- Plaza Beach Resort in Carmen, part of the bay

- Location within the Philippines Butuan Bay (Philippines)
- Location: Mindanao, Philippines
- Coordinates: 9°4′0.48″N 125°18′2.16″E
- Type: bay
- Part of: Bohol Sea
- River sources: Agusan River, Masao River, Jabonga River, Lake Mainit (through the Tubay River)
- Settlements: Buenavista; Butuan; Cabadbaran; Carmen; Jabonga; Magallanes; Nasipit; Tubay

Butuan Bay is a bay and extension of the Bohol Sea or Mindanao Sea, in the northeast section of Mindanao in the Philippines. Its main river source is the Agusan River, which empties into the bay at the coastal city of Butuan. Butuan Bay is completely contained with the Agusan del Norte province.

== Ports of Butuan Bay ==
Butuan Bay has only two major ports, the Port of Nasipit in Nasipit and the Port of Masao a.k.a. Masao River Port in Butuan. The Port of Masao is Butuan's seaport, and it was built to avoid having the city depend on the Port of Nasipit, which is the larger of the two ports. The Port of Nasipit is a major "hub" for the various ferries & shipping going to Butuan Bay and here are several major shipping & ferry lines serving the Manila and Cebu routes, which are: 2GO Travel, Cokaliong Shipping Lines and Trans-Asia Shipping Lines. The distance between the two ports is 27.1 kilometers [16.84 miles].

== Bancasi Airport ==
Between the 2 ports, there is Bancasi Airport which is in Butuan, a regional airport and is the only airport in Agusan del Norte and the largest in Caraga. The airport is classified as a trunkline airport, or a major commercial airport, by the Air Transportation Office, a body of the Department of Transportation that is responsible for the operations of not only this airport but also of all other airports, except the major international airports. The distances from the Airport to the two ports [Nasipit & Masao] is 15 kilometers [9.3 miles ] to the Port of Nasipit and 12.9 kilometers [8.1 miles] to the Port of Masao.

== Regional Highway Transportation ==
Bancasi Airport, the Port of Nasipit and the Port of Masao, are linked by the Butuan-Cagayan de Oro-Iligan Highway which also connects to Cagayan de Oro and Surigao City. Cagayan de Oro is 154 kilometers [95.5 miles] west and Surigao City is 150 kilometers [93.2 miles] north from the Port of Nasipit.

The Ampayon Intersection which is 33 kilometers [20.5 miles] from the Port of Nasipit, which is where the Butuan-Cagayan de Oro-Iligan Highway connects to the Pan-Philippine Highway a.k.a. the National Highway or Maharlika Highway, which is the gateway to the provinces of eastern & southern Mindanao.

== Other Nearby Ports & Airports ==
The next two closest ports are the Port of Surigao in Surigao City, and the Port of Cagayan de Oro in Cagayan de Oro. Also, the next two closest airports are the Surigao Airport in Surigao City, and the Laguindingan Airport in Laguindingan.

== Philippine Coast Guard Detachment ==
The Philippine Coast Guard — CG Detachment Nasipit is located at the Port of Nasipit near the Nasipit SeaPort Terminal.

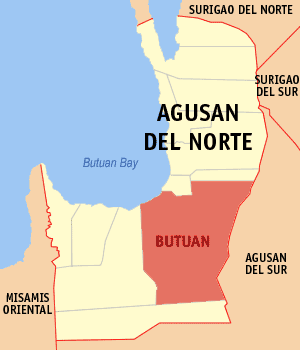
Map of Agusan del Norte showing the location of Butuan Bay and Butuan.

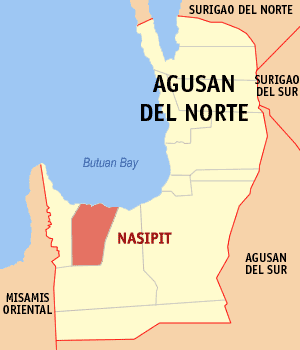
Map of Agusan del Norte showing the location of Nasipit.
