= Remedios T. Romualdez =

Municipality in Agusan del Norte, Philippines

Remedios T. Romualdez Mina-ano
- Municipality
- Municipality of Remedios T. Romualdez
- Remedios T. Romualdez Municipal Hall

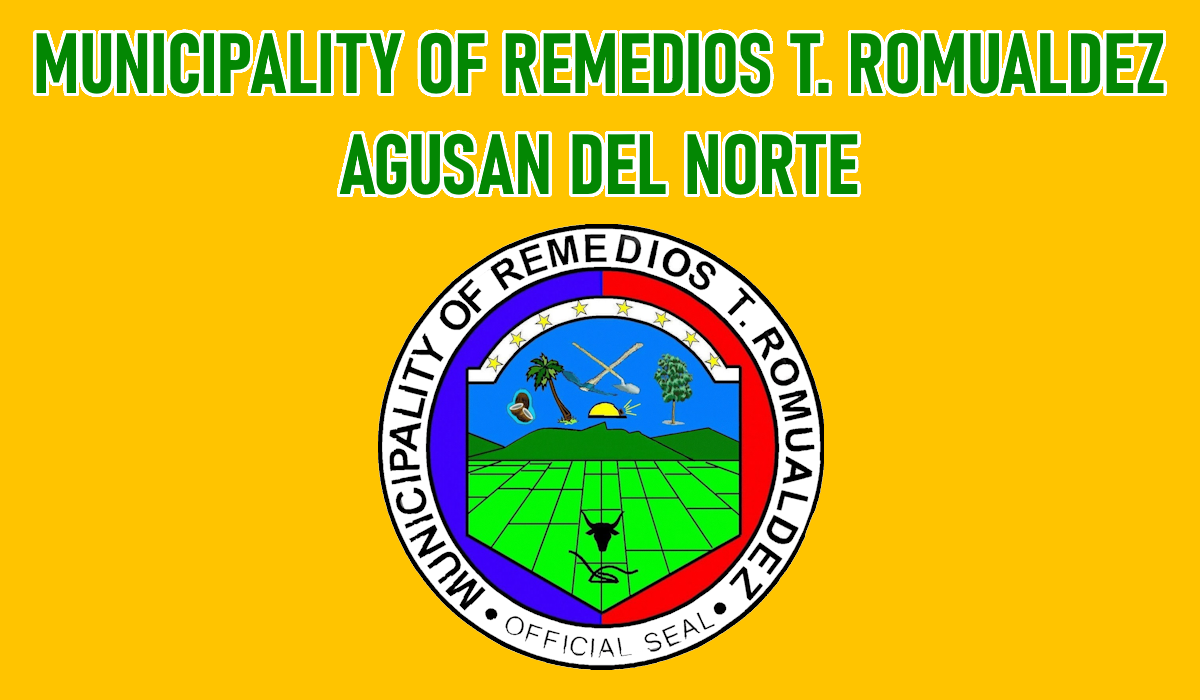
- Flag Seal
- Nickname: Agay
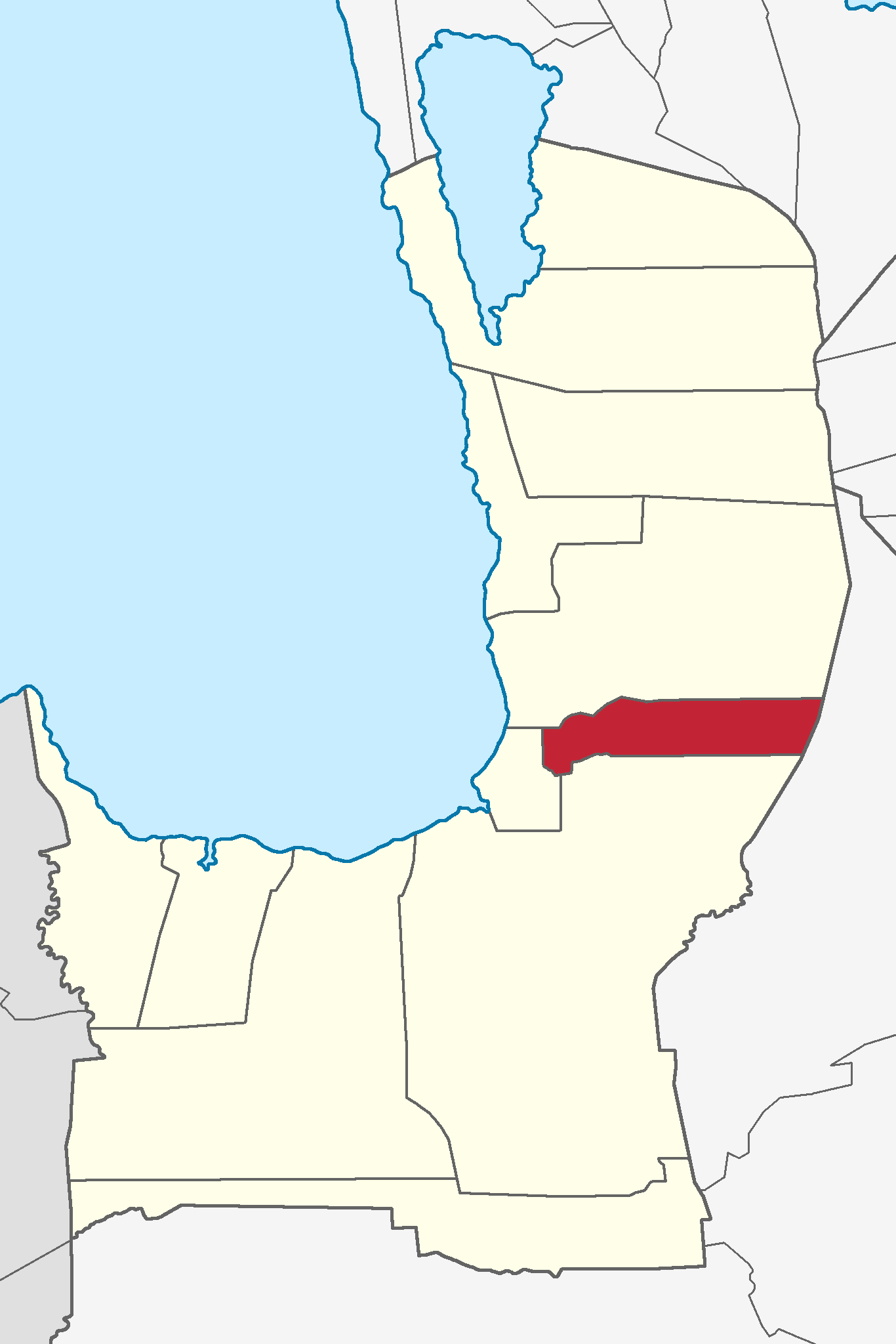
- Map of Agusan del Norte with Remedios T. Romualdez highlighted
- Interactive map of Remedios T. Romualdez
- Location within the Philippines
- Coordinates: 9°03′N 125°35′E
- Country: Philippines
- Region: Caraga
- Province: Agusan del Norte
- District: Lone district
- Founded: September 08, 1982
- Named for: Remedios Trinidad Romualdez, Imelda Marcos' mother
- Barangays: 8 (see Barangays)

Government
  - Type: Sangguniang Bayan
  - Mayor: Richard P. Daquipil
  - Vice Mayor: Eleuterio D. Enriquez
  - Representative: Dale Corvera
  - Municipal Council: Members: Bernarditha B. Daquipil; Juvy P. Soliva; Romeo P. Agusin; Elsie Mae D. Simbajon; Vicente P. Talili; Christopher S. Tinoy; Asforas A. Gica; Mark David L. Ceniza
  - Electorate: 13,565 voters (2025)

Area
  - Total: 79.15 km^{2} (30.56 sq mi)
- Elevation: 26 m (85 ft)
- Highest elevation: 2,013 m (6,604 ft)
- Lowest elevation: 1 m (3.3 ft)

Population (2024 census)
  - Total: 17,250
  - Density: 217.9/km^{2} (564.5/sq mi)
  - Households: 4,035

Economy
  - Income class: 4th municipal income class
  - Poverty incidence: 20.42% (2023)
  - Revenue: ₱ 119.7 million (2024)
  - Assets: ₱ 474.6 million (2024)
  - Expenditure: ₱ 49.09 million (2024)
  - Liabilities: ₱ 133.1 million (2024)

Service provider
  - Electricity: Agusan del Norte Electric Cooperative (ANECO)
- Time zone: UTC+8 (PST)
- ZIP code: 8611
- PSGC: 1600212000
- IDD : area code: +63 (0)85
- Native languages: Agusan; Butuanon; Cebuano; Higaonon; Tagalog
- Website: www.rtradn.gov.ph

Remedios T. Romualdez, officially the Municipality of Remedios T. Romualdez (Cebuano: Lungsod sa Remedios T. Romualdez; Tagalog: Bayan ng Remedios T. Romualdez), is a municipality in the province of Agusan del Norte, Philippines. According to the 2024 census, it has a population of 17,250 people, making it the least populated town in the province.

The town is one of the leading rice producers of Agusan del Norte province.

== Etymology ==
Remedios T. Romualdez was named after Remedios Trinidad Romualdez, the mother of former First Lady Imelda Marcos, the wife of former Philippine President Ferdinand Marcos.

== History ==
Remedios T. Romualdez was created into a municipality on September 8, 1982, when the barangays of Agay, Basilisa, Humilog, Tagbongabong, San Antonio, and Panaytayon, all of the then-municipality of Cabadbaran, were constituted into the newly created town, through Batas Pambansa Blg. 236.

The seat of the Municipal Government Center was designated in Barangay Agay, now Barangay Poblacion 1.

Remedios T. Romualdez is the youngest town in the Province of Agusan del Norte.

== Geography ==
According to the Philippine Statistics Authority, the municipality has a land area of 79.15 square kilometres (30.56 sq mi) constituting 2.90% of the 2,730.24-square-kilometre- (1,054.15 sq mi) total area of Agusan del Norte.

It is situated along the Maharlika Highway. It is bounded by Cabadbaran to the north, Municipality of Sibagat, Agusan del Sur to the east, Butuan to the south, and Magallanes, Agusan del Norte to the west.

=== Elevation ===
Remedios T. Romualdez is located at 9°03′N 125°35′E. Elevation at these coordinates is estimated at 23.8 meters above sea level (M.a.s.l.).

=== Climate ===
Climate data for Remedios T. Romualdez, Agusan del Norte
Month	Jan	Feb	Mar	Apr	May	Jun	Jul	Aug	Sep	Oct	Nov	Dec	Year
Mean daily maximum °C (°F)	27 (81)	28 (82)	28 (82)	30 (86)	30 (86)	30 (86)	30 (86)	30 (86)	30 (86)	30 (86)	29 (84)	28 (82)	29 (84)
Mean daily minimum °C (°F)	23 (73)	23 (73)	23 (73)	23 (73)	24 (75)	25 (77)	24 (75)	25 (77)	25 (77)	24 (75)	24 (75)	24 (75)	24 (75)
Average precipitation mm (inches)	277 (10.9)	211 (8.3)	155 (6.1)	109 (4.3)	166 (6.5)	191 (7.5)	154 (6.1)	138 (5.4)	127 (5.0)	173 (6.8)	241 (9.5)	231 (9.1)	2,173 (85.5)
Average rainy days	22.7	19.1	20.0	19.9	25.9	27.6	27.6	26.1	25.1	26.8	24.3	23.1	288.2
Source: Meteoblue

=== Barangays ===
Remedios T. Romualdez is politically subdivided into 8 barangays. Each barangay consists of puroks while some have sitios.

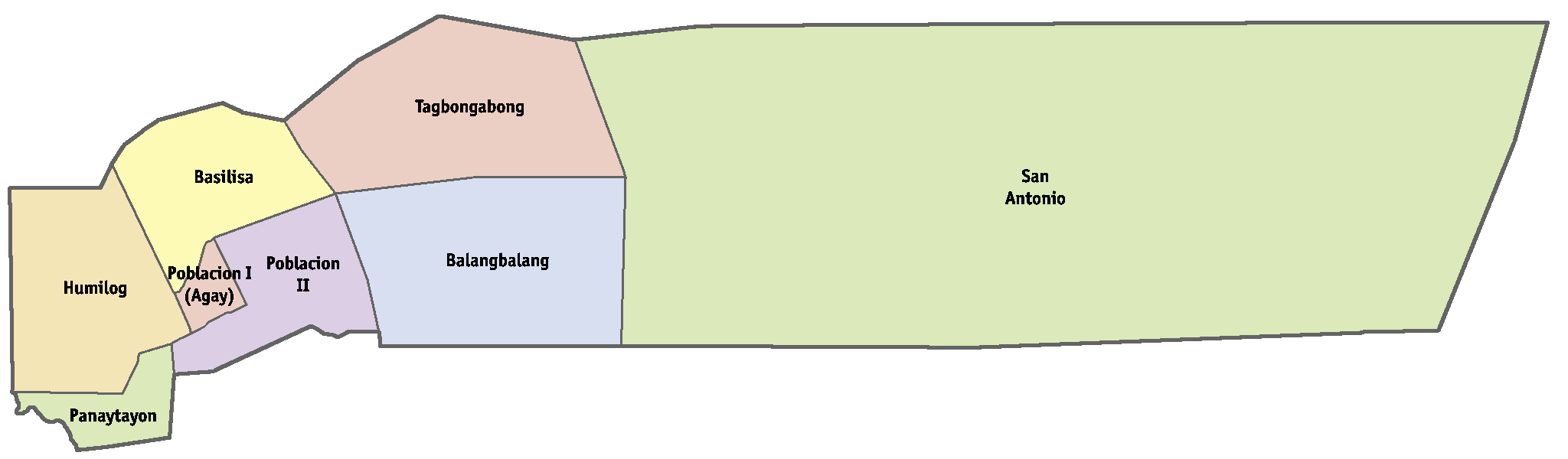
Political map of Remedios T. Romualdez

PSGC	Barangay	Population			±% p.a.	
		2024		2010		
160212002	Balangbalang	14.4%	2,482	2,362	▴	0.34%
160212003	Basilisa	12.6%	2,181	2,092	▴	0.29%
160212004	Humilog	10.2%	1,768	1,675	▴	0.38%
160212005	Panaytayon	6.3%	1,084	1,077	▴	0.04%
160212001	Poblacion I (Agay)	15.1%	2,611	2,581	▴	0.08%
160212008	Poblacion II	10.2%	1,764	2,027	▾	−0.96%
160212006	San Antonio	12.3%	2,122	1,958	▴	0.56%
160212007	Tagbongabong	11.9%	2,046	1,963	▴	0.29%
	Total		17,250	15,735	▴	0.64%

== Demographics ==
Population census of Remedios T. Romualdez
Year	Pop.	±% p.a.
1990	10,490	—
1995	12,621	+3.53%
2000	13,359	+1.23%
2007	14,976	+1.59%
2010	15,735	+1.82%
2015	16,058	+0.39%
2020	17,155	+1.40%
2024	17,250	+0.13%
Source: Philippine Statistics Authority

In the 2024 census, Remedios T. Romualdez had a population of 17,250. The population density was 220 inhabitants per square kilometre (570/sq mi).

== Economy ==
Poverty incidence of Remedios T. Romualdez (%)

Source: Philippine Statistics Authority

== Tourism ==
=== Nature and Man-made Attractions ===
- Tagnote Falls - located at Sitio Tagnote, Barangay San Antonio
- Sak-a Falls - located in Barangay San Antonio
- Mount Hilong-Hilong - accessible through Malvar Trail situated in Barangay San Antonio, the highest mountain peak in the entire Caraga. It is 2,012.99 meters above sea level (masl).
- Humilog Cave 1 - located in Barangay Humilog
