= Agusan del Norte =

Province in Caraga, Philippines

- Province
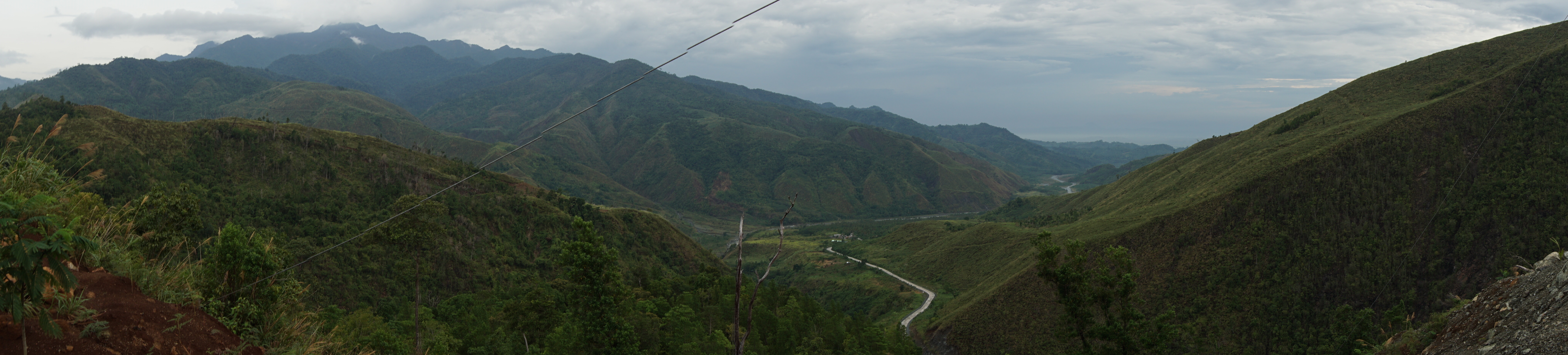
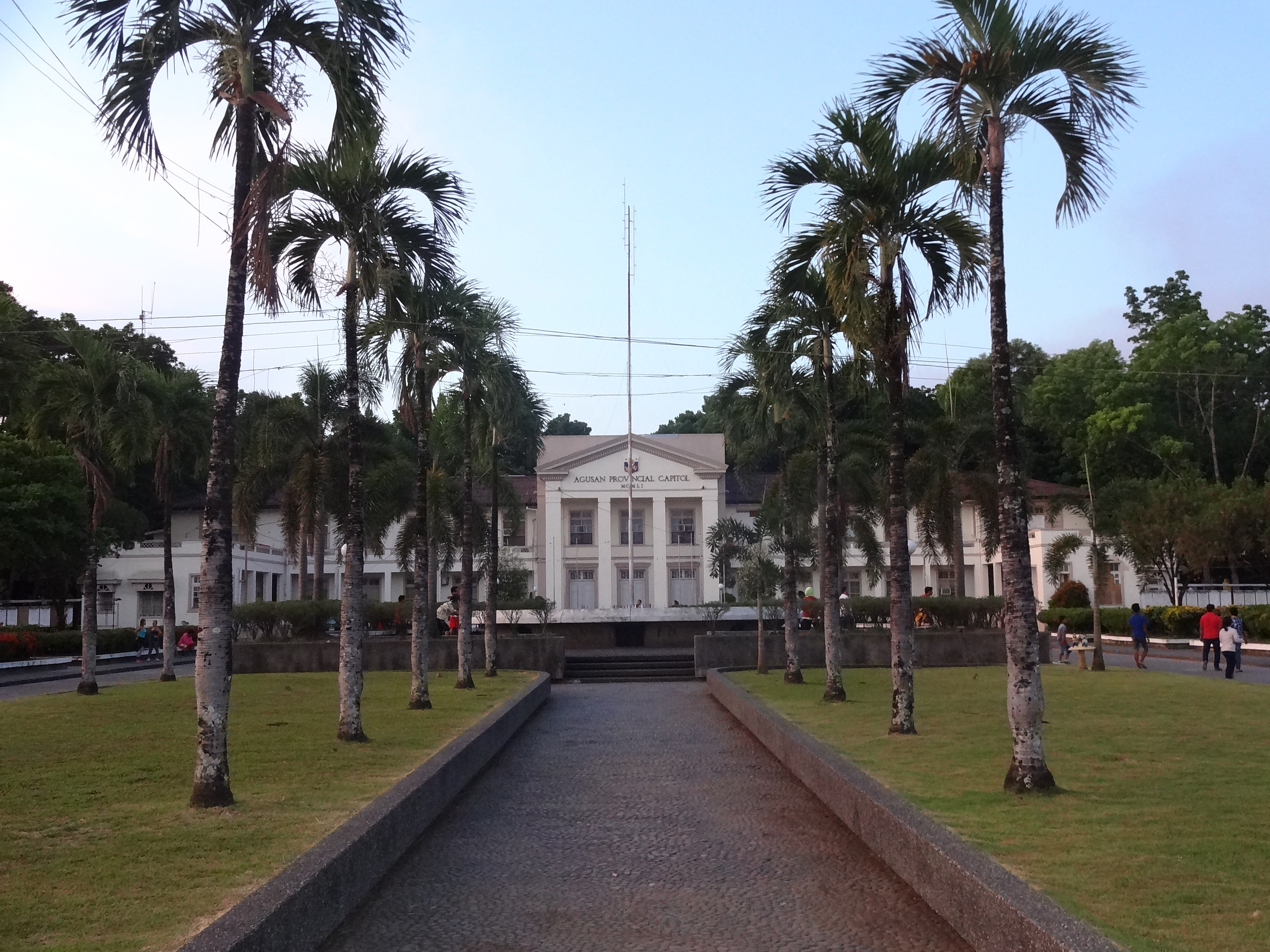
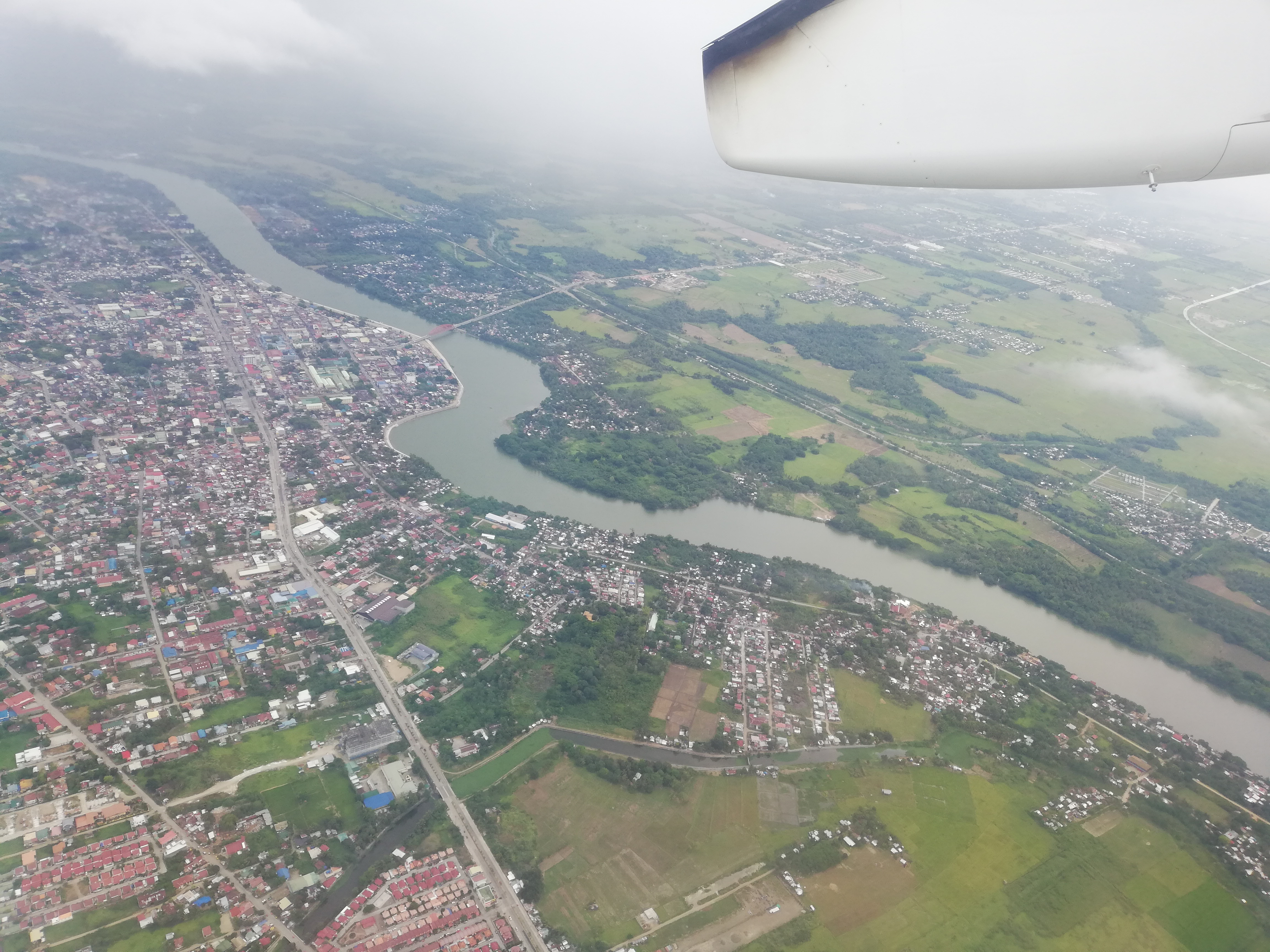
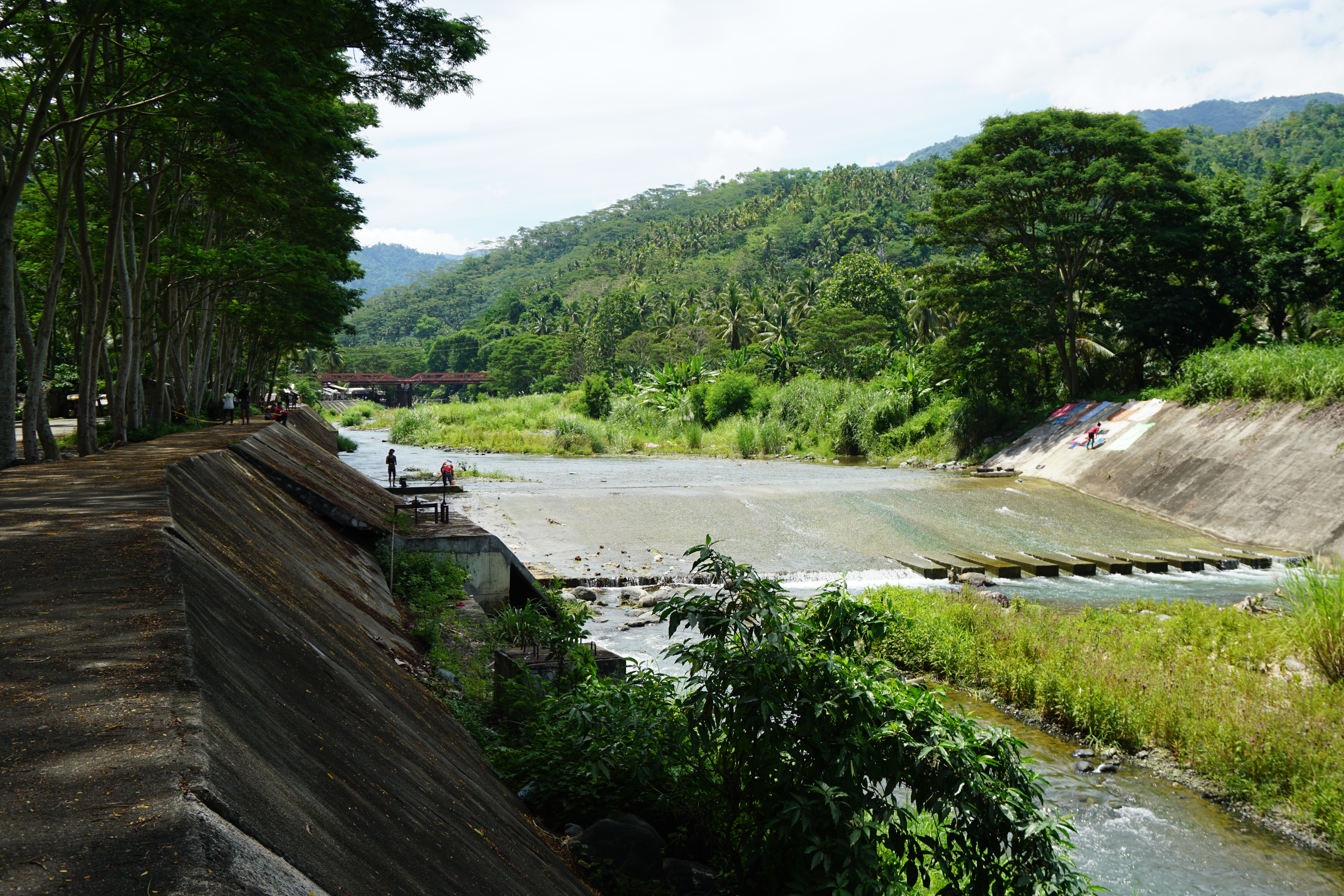
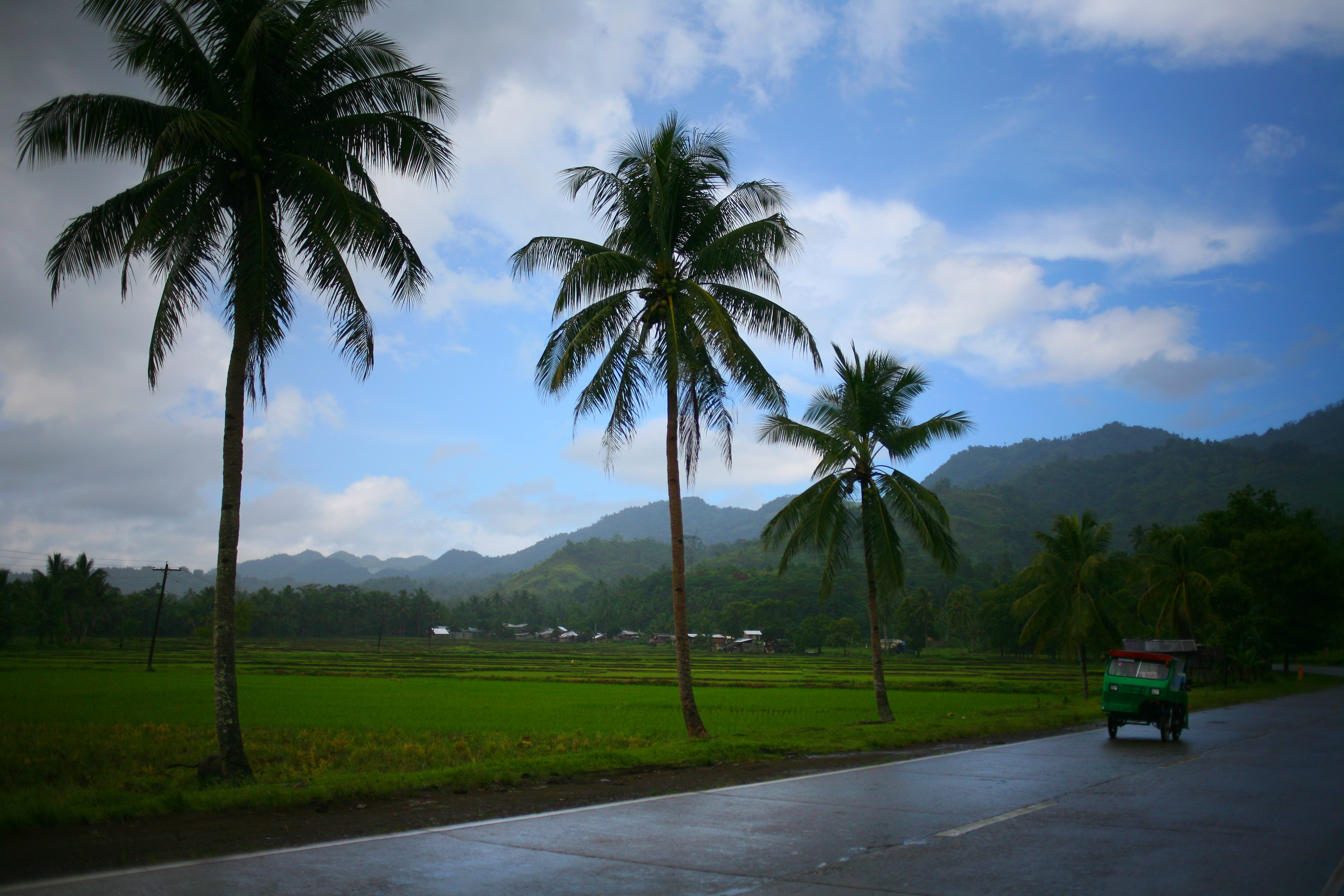
- Clockwise from top: Puting Bato in Cabadbaran; aerial view of Butuan and the Agusan River; landscape in Tubay; Santiago River in Santiago; and the Agusan del Norte Provincial Capitol.

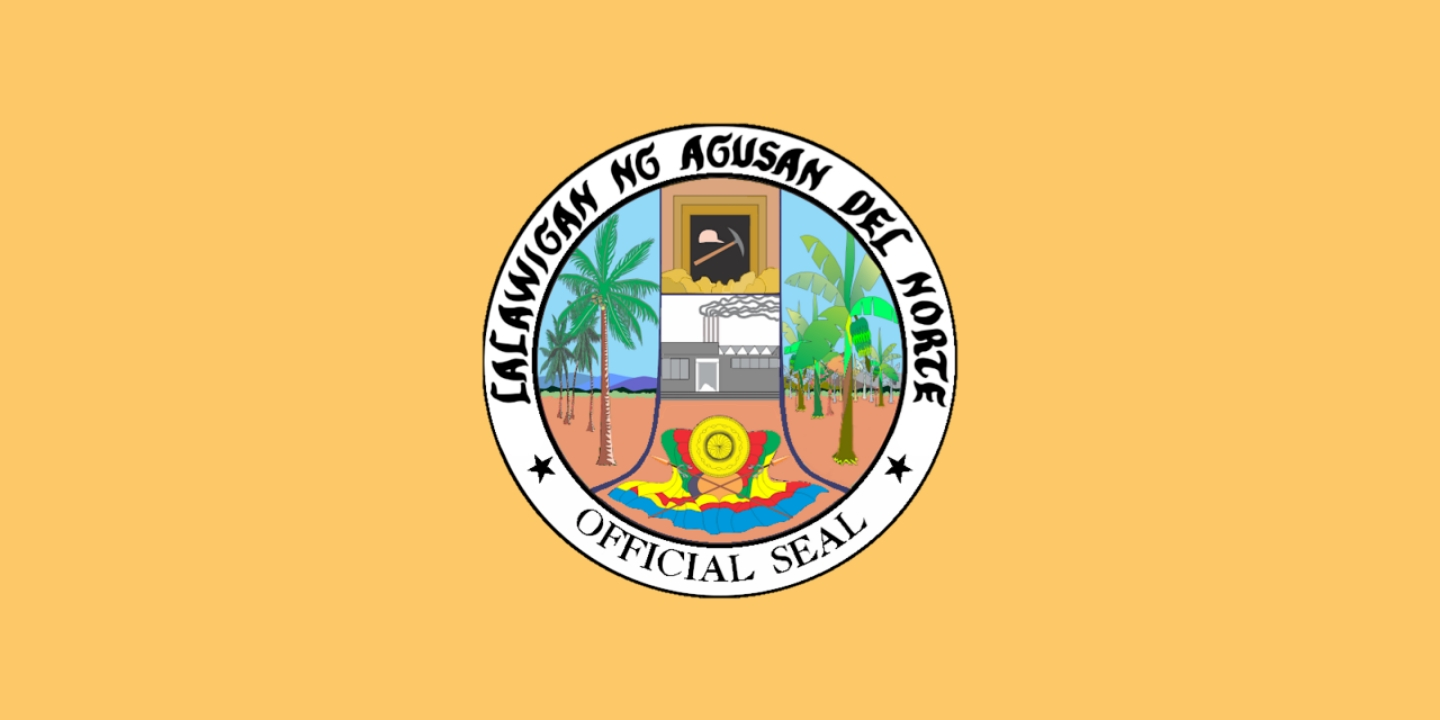
- Flag Seal

- Location in the Philippines
- Coordinates: 9°10′N 125°30′E
- Country: Philippines
- Region: Caraga
- Founded: 17 June 1967
- Capital: Cabadbaran
- Government seat and largest city: Butuan* (Note: As per Republic Act No. 8811, Cabadbaran is the province's official capital. However, the provincial government still holds office in Butuan, pending the actual transfer of provincial offices to the new capital.)

Government
  - Governor: Ma. Angelica Rosedell M. Amante-Matba (PDP–Laban)
  - Vice Governor: Enrico Corvera (PDP–Laban)
  - Representative: Dale Corvera
  - Legislature: Agusan del Norte Provincial Board
  - Electorate: 492,857 voters (2025)

Area
  - Total: 2,730.24 km^{2} (1,054.15 sq mi)
  - Rank: 48th out of 82
- (excluding Butuan)
- Highest elevation (Mount Hilong-Hilong): 2,012 m (6,601 ft)

Population (2024 census)
  - Total: 404,100
  - Rank: 64th out of 82
  - Density: 148.0/km^{2} (383.3/sq mi)
  - Rank: 62nd out of 82
  - Households: 91,016
- (excluding Butuan)
- Demonym: North Agusanon

Divisions
  - Independent cities: 1: Butuan*
  - Component cities: 1: Cabadbaran
  - Municipalities: 10: Buenavista; Carmen; Jabonga; Kitcharao; Las Nieves; Magallanes; Nasipit; Remedios T. Romualdez; Santiago; Tubay
  - Barangays: 167 including independent cities: 253
  - Districts: Legislative districts of Agusan del Norte (shared with Butuan)

Economy
  - Income class: 1st provincial income class
  - Poverty incidence: 14.7% (2023)
  - Revenue: ₱ 1,803 million (2024)
  - Assets: ₱ 5,865 million (2024)
  - Expenditure: ₱ 1,537 million (2024)
  - Liabilities: ₱ 1,329 million (2024)
- Time zone: UTC+8 (PHT)
- PSGC: 160200000
- IDD : area code: +63 (0)85
- ISO 3166 code: PH-AGN
- Spoken languages: Cebuano; Butuanon; Agusan; Higaonon; Mamanwa; Surigaonon; Filipino; English
- Website: www.agusandelnorte.gov.ph
- * Butuan is a highly-urbanized city, politically independent from Agusan del Norte.

Agusan del Norte, officially the Province of Agusan del Norte, (Note: lit. 'Northern Agusan';Cebuano: Amihanang Agusan; Butuanon: Probinsya hong Agusan del Norte; Filipino: Lalawigan ng Agusan del Norte) is a province in the Philippines located in the Caraga region. It is situated in the western section of Mindanao. It is bordered on the northwest by Butuan Bay; northeast by Surigao del Norte; mid-east by Surigao del Sur; southeast by Agusan del Sur, and southwest by Misamis Oriental. Its capital is the city of Cabadbaran.

Geographically situated in the province is the highly urbanized city of Butuan, which is the largest city in Agusan del Norte and the regional center of Caraga. Although administered independent, it currently hosts several provincial government offices and serves as the province's de facto capital.

== History ==
Historical affiliations

Spain 1521–1898
United States of America 1898–1942
Japan 1942–1945
United States of America 1945–1946
Philippines 1946–present

=== Spanish colonial era ===
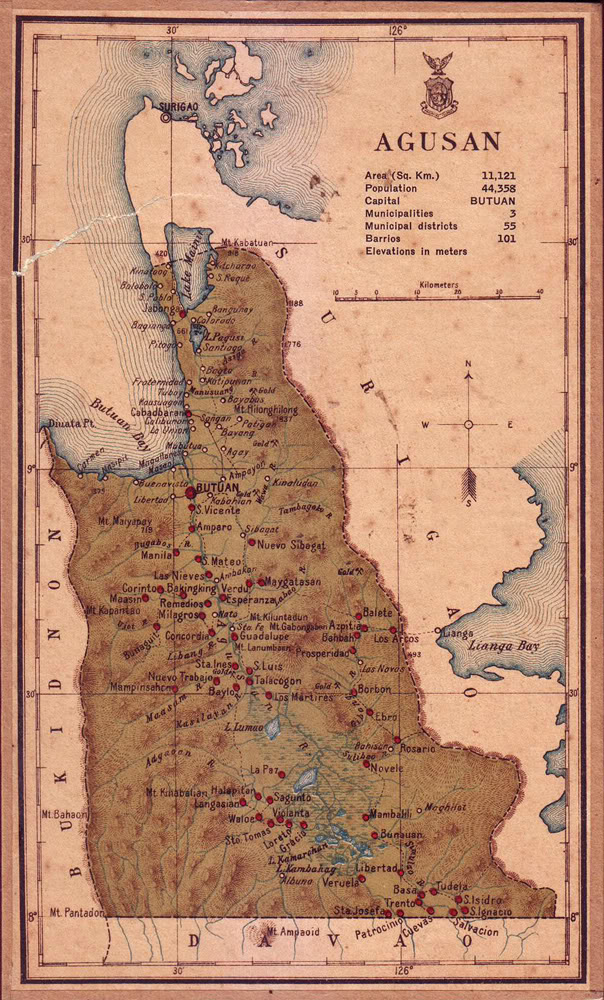
Map of Agusan province in 1918

Prior to its creation as an independent province, Agusan, as it was once undivided, was under the jurisdiction of Surigao province during the Spanish colonial period.

=== American colonial era ===
In 1907, Agusan province was created as a separate province by the Philippine Commission with two sub-provinces — Butuan and Bukidnon.

=== Japanese occupation ===
During World War II in 1942, the Japanese Imperial forces landed in Northern Agusan.

In 1945, Filipino soldiers of the 6th, 10th, 101st, 102nd, 103rd, 107th and 110th Infantry Divisions of the Philippine Commonwealth Army and the 10th Infantry Regiment of the Philippine Constabulary together with the recognized Agusan guerrilla fighter units began the liberation of Northern Agusan from Japanese forces during World War II.

During the war, a unit of the joint Philippine-American defense force were located at Manot, Talacogon, in the interior of the Agusan Valley.

=== Philippine independence ===
In 1967, Republic Act 4979 divided Agusan into two independent provinces: Agusan del Norte and Agusan del Sur.

=== Contemporary ===
On August 16, 2000, the seat of provincial government was transferred from Butuan to Cabadbaran through Republic Act 8811, although the province is yet to complete the transfer of provincial services and functions to the new capital.

The capital town of Cabadbaran became a component city by virtue of Republic Act No. 9494 which sought to convert the municipality into a city. The law was ratified on July 28, 2007. However, the cityhood status was lost twice in the years 2008 and 2010 after the LCP questioned the validity of the cityhood law. The cityhood status was reaffirmed after the court finalized its ruling on February 15, 2011 which declared the cityhood law constitutional.

== Geography ==
Agusan del Norte is situated in Mindanao's western section of Caraga. It is bordered on the northwest by Butuan Bay; northeast by Surigao del Norte; mid-east by Surigao del Sur; southeast by Agusan del Sur, and southwest by Misamis Oriental. Agusan del Norte has a total land area of 2,730.24 square kilometres or 1,054.15 square miles. When Butuan is included for geographical purposes, the province's land area is 3,546.86 square kilometres (1,369.45 sq mi).

The central portion of the province forms the lower basin of the third longest river in the country, the Agusan, its mouth located at Butuan Bay. Consequently, the terrain surrounding the river features flat to rolling lands. Mountainous terrain dominate the northeastern and western areas.

The country's fourth largest lake, Lake Mainit is situated at the northern border between the province of Surigao del Norte.

=== Administrative divisions ===
Agusan del Norte comprises 10 municipalities and 1 component city. There are 253 barangays (including the independent city of Butuan).

The city of Cabadbaran is the officially designated capital of the province per Republic Act 8811. The highly urbanized city of Butuan is geographically within but administratively independent from the province.

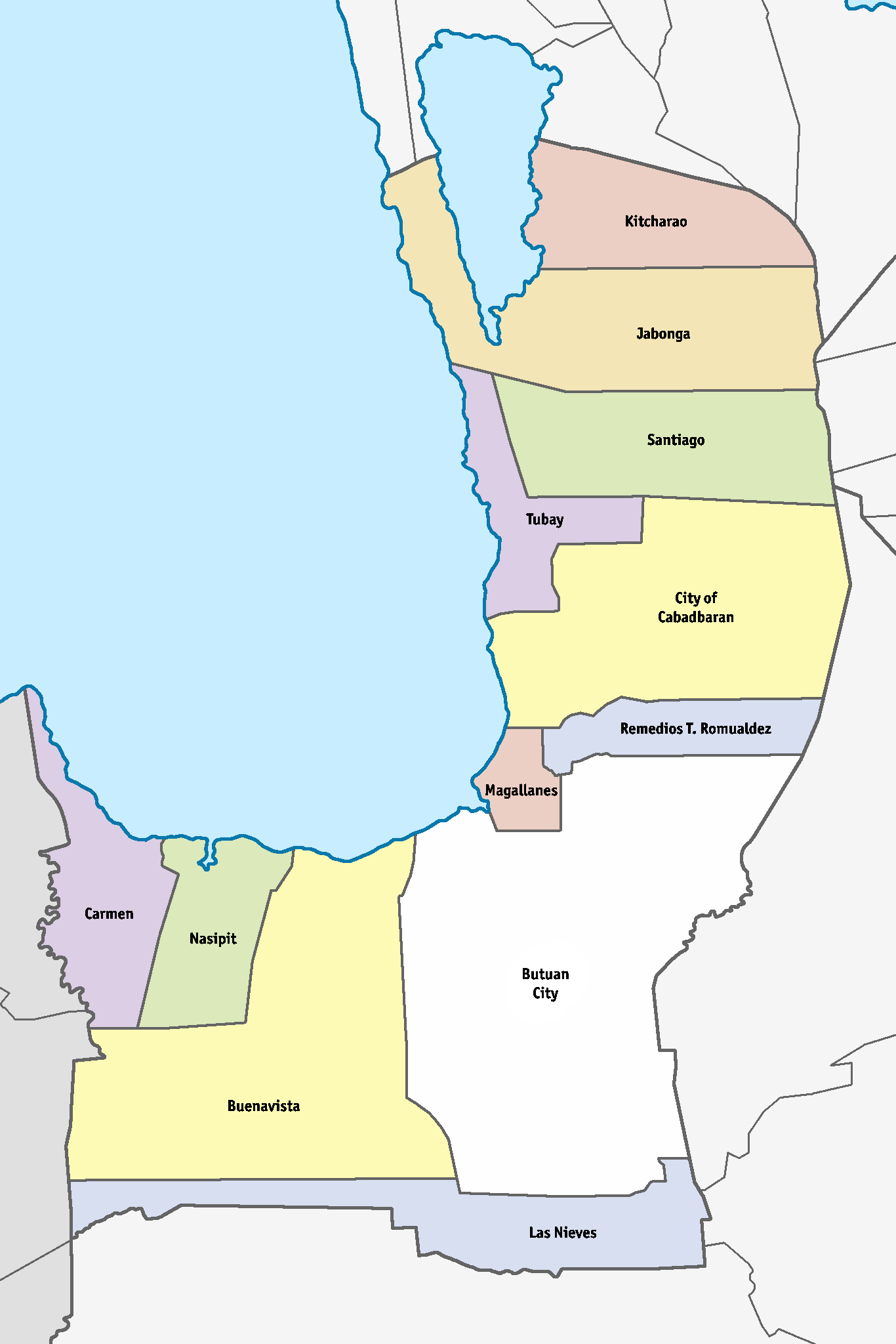
Political map of Agusan del Norte

City or municipality (Note: The globe icon marks the city/town center.)		Population			±% p.a.	Area		Density (2020)		Brgy.
		(2020)		(2015)		km^{2}	sq mi	/km^{2}	/sq mi	
Buenavista		17.8%	68,892	61,614	+2.15%	475.61	183.63	140	360	25
Butuan City∞	‡	—	372,910	337,063	+1.94%	816.62	315.30	460	1,200	86
Cabadbaran City	†	20.7%	80,354	73,639	+1.68%	214.44	82.80	370	960	31
Carmen		6.0%	23,172	20,839	+2.04%	311.02	120.09	75	190	8
Jabonga		6.4%	24,855	23,184	+1.33%	293.00	113.13	85	220	15
Kitcharao		5.5%	21,278	18,659	+2.53%	171.92	66.38	120	310	11
Las Nieves		7.8%	30,240	28,414	+1.19%	582.69	224.98	52	130	20
Magallanes		5.8%	22,293	21,007	+1.14%	44.31	17.11	500	1,300	8
Nasipit		11.6%	44,822	41,957	+1.27%	144.40	55.75	310	800	19
Remedios T. Romualdez		4.4%	17,155	16,058	+1.27%	79.15	30.56	220	570	8
Santiago		7.4%	28,657	24,200	+3.27%	275.61	106.41	100	260	8
Tubay		6.7%	25,785	24,932	+0.64%	138.09	53.32	190	490	13
TOTAL (Note: Total figures exclude the highly urbanized city of Butuan.)			387,503	354,503	+1.71%	2,730.24	1,054.15	140	360	166
	† Provincial capital and component city					Municipality				
‡ Highly urbanized city (geographically within but independent from the province)

∞ Largest settlement

== Demographics ==
Population census of Agusan del Norte

Year	Pop.	±% p.a.
1903	13,752	—
1918	24,729	+3.99%
1939	64,121	+4.64%
1948	88,917	+3.70%
1960	177,333	+5.92%
1970	146,959	−1.86%

Year	Pop.	±% p.a.
1975	168,053	+2.73%
1980	192,932	+2.80%
1990	237,629	+2.11%
1995	267,411	+2.24%
2000	285,570	+1.42%
2007	309,338	+1.11%

Year	Pop.	±% p.a.
2010	332,487	+2.66%
2015	354,503	+1.23%
2020	387,503	+1.89%
2024	404,100	+1.01%

(excluding Butuan)
Source: PSA

The population of Agusan del Norte in the 2024 census was 404,100 people, making it the country's 64th most populous province. It had a density of 140 inhabitants per square kilometre or 360 inhabitants per square mile.

When the highly urbanized city of Butuan is included for geographical purposes, the province's population is 691,566 people, with a density of 195 inhabitants per square kilometre (510/sq mi).

Cebuano is the most common language spoken in the province. Tagalog and English are also widely used and understood, often used for administrative functions by the local government and in education and business. Indigenous inhabitants in the province speak their respective languages and dialects fluently in addition to Cebuano. Descendants of other settlers from Luzon and other parts of Visayas speak their own respective ethnic languages to varying degrees by their respective communities within the province.

=== Religion ===
==== Catholicism ====
In 2013, the Diocese of Butuan (Catholic-Hierarchy) reported that Roman Catholicism is the predominant religion of the province comprising roughly 71% of the population. Significant minority belongs to Iglesia Filipina Independiente with 10% .

==== Others ====
The remaining beliefs usually belong to other Christian denominations like Members Church of God International (MCGI) as well as Islam. Indigenous peoples also practice their ancient beliefs, although many of them have been converted to Christianity in recent years.

== Economy ==
Poverty incidence of Agusan del Norte (%)

Source: Philippine Statistics Authority

The economy of the province is dominantly agricultural, major crops of which include rice, corn, coconut, abaca, banana and mango. Agusan del Norte is also home of the 24.9mw Lake Mainit Hydro Power Plant and 8mw Asiga Hydro Power Plant that will serves Agusan del Norte.

== Government ==
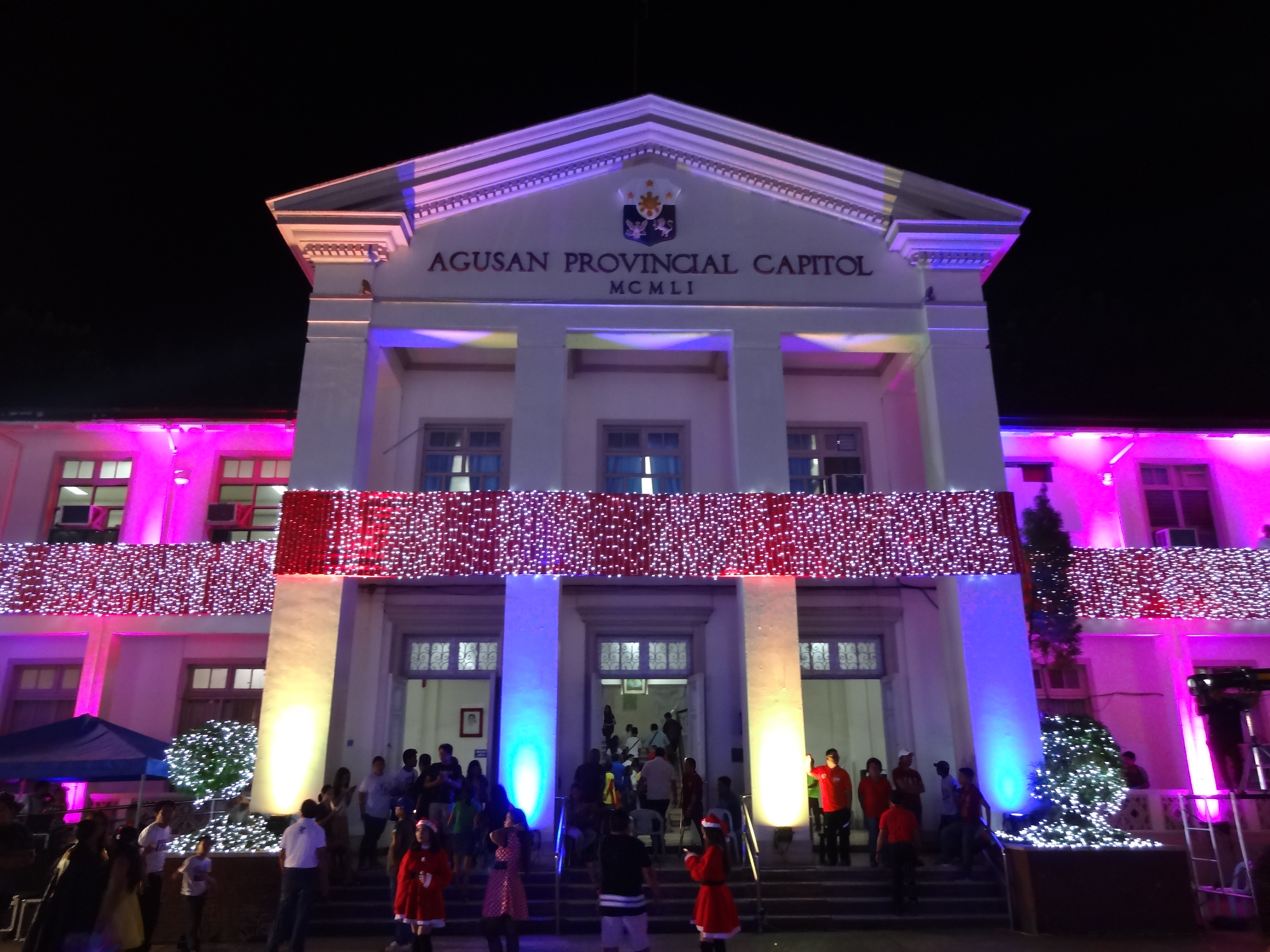
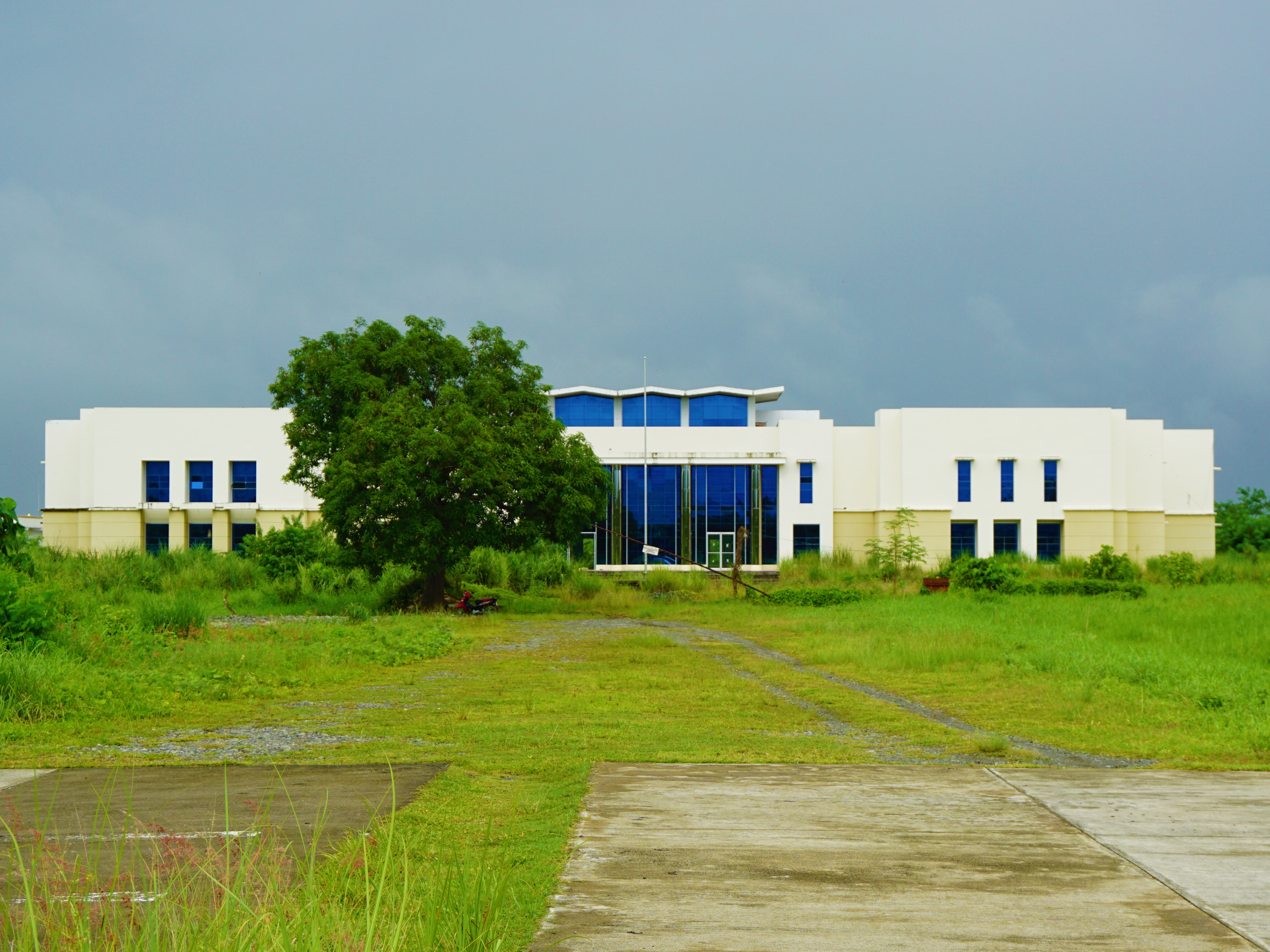
Current Provincial Capitol in Butuan (Left) and unfinished New Provincial Capitol in Cabadbaran (Right)

Agusan del Norte has two congressional districts encompassing its 10 municipalities and 1 component city, as well as the highly urbanized city of Butuan.

District	Representative	City or municipality	District population (2015)
Lone	Jose S. Aquino II	Butuan	365,477
Lone	Dale B. Corvera	Buenavista; Cabadbaran; Carmen; Jabonga; Kitcharao; Las Nieves; Magallanes; Nasipit; Remedios T. Romualdez; Santiago; Tubay	326,089

== Tourism ==
The province has many beaches in Cabadbaran and the municipalities of Carmen, Buenavista, Magallanes, Tubay, and Nasipit.

Mount Hilong-Hilong is one of the tallest mountain peak in the province, is located to boundaries of the City of Cabadbaran and the Municipality of Remedios T. Romualdez.

From the top of Prayer Mountain (Mount Pongkay), visitors can have a panoramic view of Cabadbaran which includes buildings, churches, rivers and the sea. The Agusan River, the longest in Mindanao and the third longest in the Philippines is in Butuan. Looming southwest of the Agusan Valley is Mount Mayapay, a mountain plateau. The ancient Balangay boats were found in Butuan, excavated in the Balangay Shrine across the Masao River from Bood Promontory. They played a major role because of Butuan being a port city. Since its discovery, the Balangays have become an icon of Butuan. The Kaya ng Pinoy, Inc. recreated the Balangay boats and have sailed it as part of their project, the Balangay Voyage.

== Notable personalities ==
=== Within the province jurisdiction ===
- Soledad Duterte - a Filipino teacher and activist, known as the mother of President Rodrigo Duterte (Cabadbaran)
- Edelmiro Amante - former Executive Secretary, Congressman, Assemblyman and Presidential Consultant for Mindanao Flagship Projects (Cabadbaran)
- Erlpe John Amante - former Governor and former Representative. In 2014, he was awarded as Outstanding Filipino Achiever in Public Service by the Golden Globe Annual Awards for Business Excellence (Cabadbaran)
- Maria Angelica Rosedell Amante - current governor and former representative (born in Cabadbaran)
- Sylvia Sanchez - actress (Nasipit)
- Ronald Barniso - international Taekwondo under 80 kilograms champion (Magallanes)
