= Legislative districts of Agusan del Norte =

Legislative District of the Philippines

The legislative districts of Agusan del Norte are the representations of the province of Agusan del Norte in the various national legislatures of the Philippines. The province is currently represented in the lower house of the Congress of the Philippines through its first and second congressional districts.

== History ==
Prior to gaining separate representation, areas now under the jurisdiction of Agusan del Norte were represented under the Department of Mindanao and Sulu (1917–1935) and Agusan (1935–1969).

Republic Act No. 4979, approved in a plebiscite held simultaneously with the 1967 elections, split the old Agusan Province into Agusan del Norte and Agusan del Sur and provided them each with a congressional representative. In accordance with Section 7 of R.A. 4979, Agusan del Norte first elected its separate representative starting in the 1969 elections. The chartered city of Butuan, despite being enumerated as part of the territory of neither successor province, was designated as Agusan del Norte's seat of provincial government and became part of its congressional representation.

Agusan del Norte was represented in the Interim Batasang Pambansa as part of Region X from 1978 to 1984, and returned one representative to the Regular Batasang Pambansa in 1984.

Under the new Constitution which was proclaimed on February 11, 1987, the Agusan del Norte was grouped with the highly urbanized city of Butuan and reapportioned into two congressional districts; each district elected its member to the restored House of Representatives starting that same year.

The approval of Republic Act No. 11714 on April 4, 2022, divided the province into two congressional districts: the lone legislative district of the City of Butuan and the lone legislative district of the province of Agusan del Norte, which elected their separate representatives starting in the 2025 elections.

== Senatorial representation ==
Between 1916 and 1935, the territory of what is now Agusan del Norte (then part of the undivided province of Agusan) was represented in the Senate of the Philippines through the 12th senatorial district of the Philippine Islands. However, in 1935, all senatorial districts were abolished when a unicameral National Assembly was installed under a new constitution following the passage of the Tydings–McDuffie Act, which established the Commonwealth of the Philippines. Since the 1941 elections, when the Senate was restored after a constitutional plebiscite, all twenty-four members of the upper house have been elected countrywide at-large.

== Congressional representation ==
Agusan del Norte had been represented in the lower house of various Philippine national legislatures from 1987 to 2025, through its first and second congressional districts and from 2025 through its lone congressional district.

== Provincial board districts ==
The municipalities of Agusan del Norte are represented in the Agusan del Norte Provincial Board, the Sangguniang Panlalawigan (provincial legislature) of the province, through Agusan del Norte's first and second provincial board districts.

== See also ==
- Legislative districts of Mindanao and Sulu
- Legislative districts of Agusan
  - Legislative districts of Agusan del Sur
