= Buenavista, Agusan del Norte =

Municipality in Agusan del Norte, Philippines

Buenavista
- Municipality
- Municipality of Buenavista
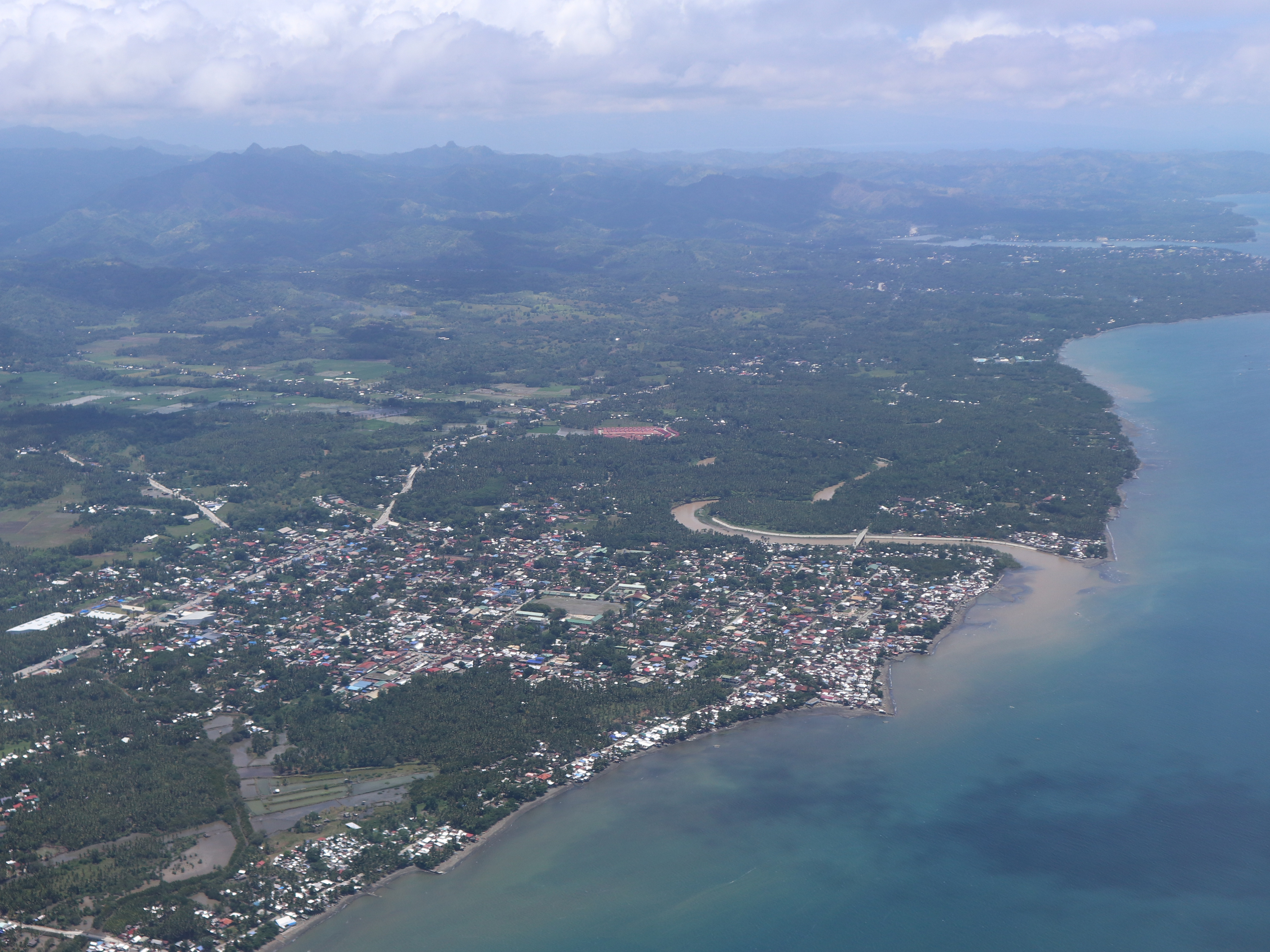
- Aerial view

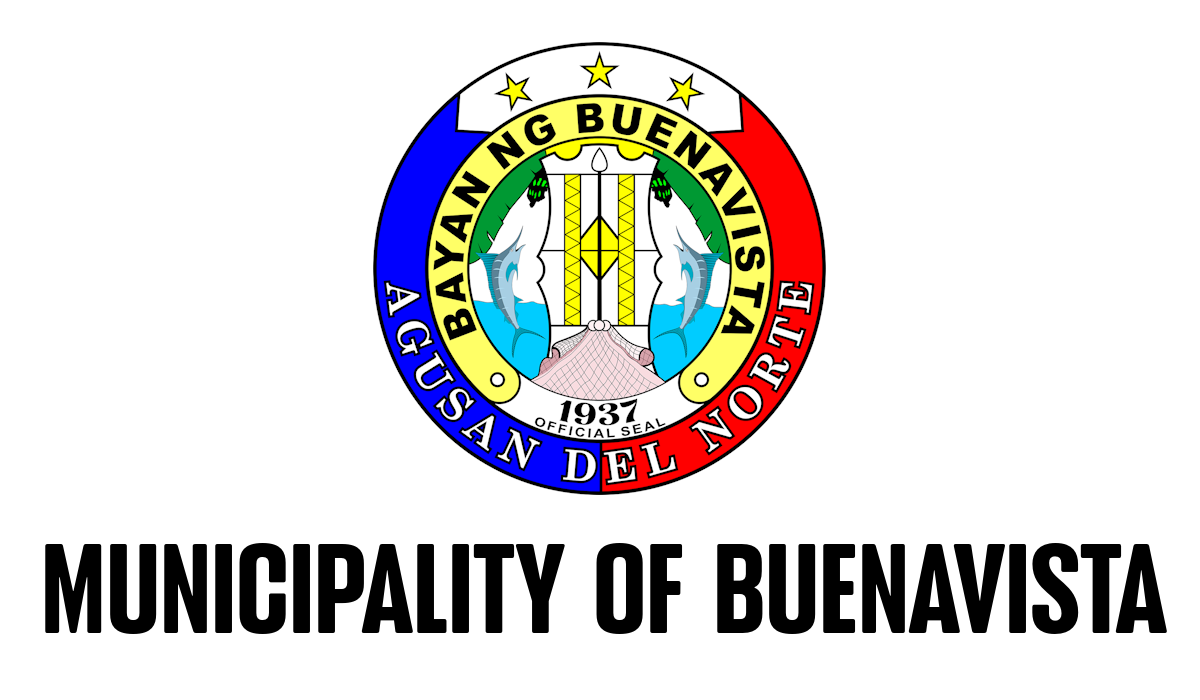
- Flag

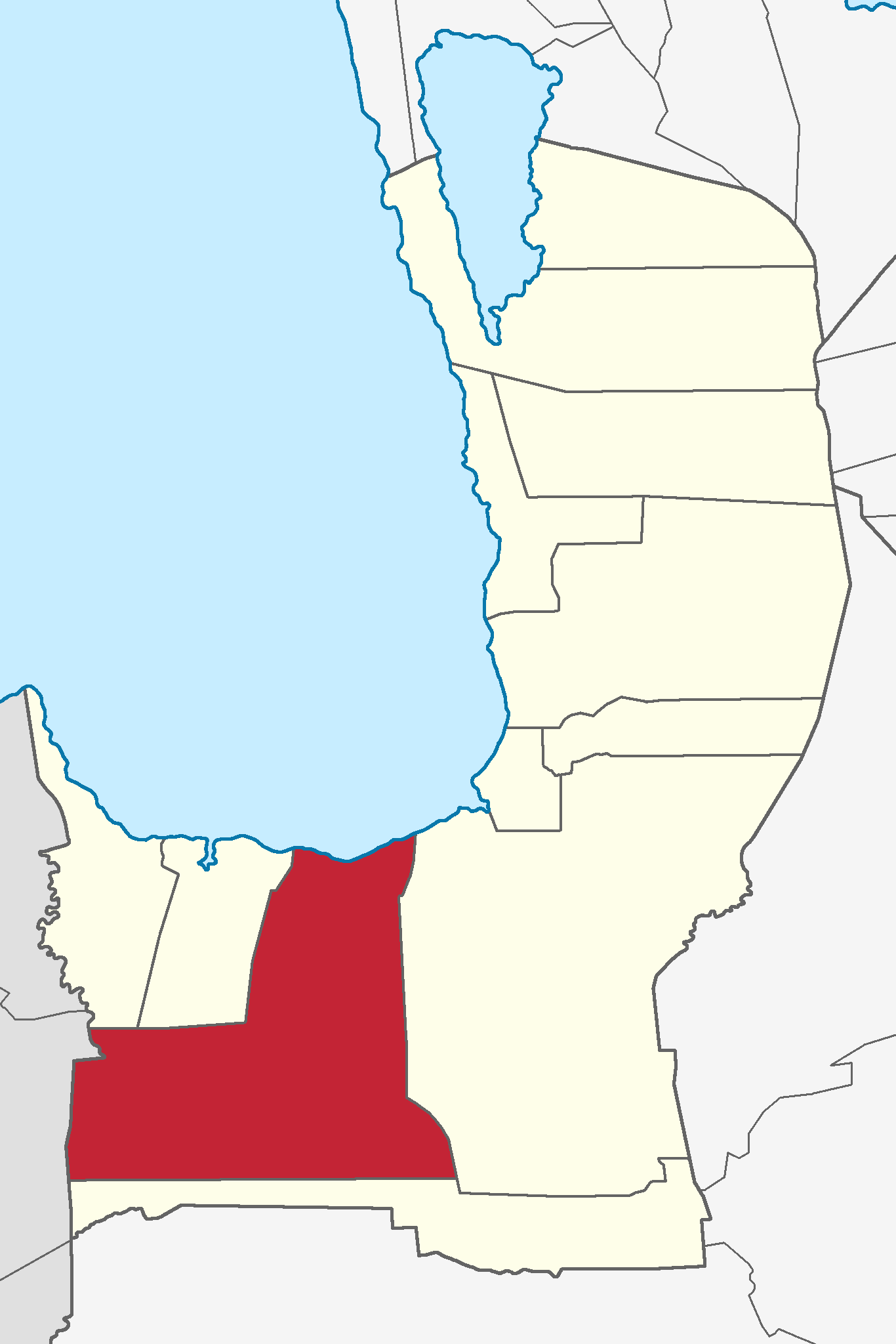
- Map of Agusan del Norte with Buenavista highlighted
- Interactive map of Buenavista
- Location within the Philippines
- Coordinates: 8°58′N 125°25′E
- Country: Philippines
- Region: Caraga
- Province: Agusan del Norte
- District: Lone district
- Founded: January 1, 1937
- Barangays: 25 (see Barangays)

Government
  - Type: Sangguniang Bayan
  - Mayor: Joselito T. Roble
  - Vice Mayor: Atty Ramon Alejandro G. Bungabong
  - Representative: Dale Corvera
  - Municipal Council: Members: Ruben A. Gonzaga; Ferdinand G. Daguipa; Charleston T. David; Afro H. Arreza III; Salvador L. Satorre; Eduardo P. Makiling; Rodrigo M. Luzon; Roel T. Arobo
  - Electorate: 52,245 voters (2025)

Area
  - Total: 475.61 km^{2} (183.63 sq mi)
- Elevation: 18 m (59 ft)
- Highest elevation: 228 m (748 ft)
- Lowest elevation: 0 m (0 ft)

Population (2024 census)
  - Total: 70,691
  - Density: 148.63/km^{2} (384.96/sq mi)
  - Households: 16,512

Economy
  - Income class: 1st municipal income class
  - Poverty incidence: 19.74% (2023)
  - Revenue: ₱ 393.1 million (2024)
  - Assets: ₱ 1,141 million (2024)
  - Expenditure: ₱ 175.1 million (2024)
  - Liabilities: ₱ 320.8 million (2024)

Service provider
  - Electricity: Agusan del Norte Electric Cooperative (ANECO)
- Time zone: UTC+8 (PST)
- ZIP code: 8601
- PSGC: 1600201000
- IDD : area code: +63 (0)85
- Native languages: Agusan; Butuanon; Cebuano; Higaonon; Tagalog

Buenavista, officially the Municipality of Buenavista (Cebuano: Lungsod sa Buenavista; Tagalog: Bayan ng Buenavista), is a municipality in the province of Agusan del Norte, Philippines. According to the 2024 census, it has a population of 70,691 people.

== Etymology ==
Adolfo Calo, a native of Butuan, along with some natives and Spaniards visited the place. They saw the village overlooking the sea and appreciated the beauty of nature in abundance. They exclaimed "Bien Vista", which means "Good View" thus the present name Buenavista.

== History ==
The written history of Buenavista start in the year 1877. It was said that during this year a group of nomadic Manobo from the frontiers of Agusan found an ideal place for their tempora-fishing retreat and rendezvous.

Soon, the village of Tortosa was founded by two Christian pioneers, Innocentes Paler and Marcelo Dalaguida, who were later on joined by Luis Gupana and a handful of Manobo. Credited with a name to the village were a group of natives and Spaniards who visited the place to trade with the villagers and found the place to be abundant with the sea tortoise.

The fame of Tortosa as a good fishing was heard by the people of the neighboring Butuan. Thus a fresh wave migrants came to settle.

Later, Tortosa was renamed to Kihaw-an in memory of a white deer held sacred by the early inhabitants. It was said that this deer was found dead by the natives near the bank of the river which encircles the village. Its carcass was placed all over the village thus the village got the name Kihaw-an, a derivative of a local dialect "Baho-an", which literally mean "to smell", or "source of bad smell".

Soon the village got another new name. It was said that Adolfo Calo, a native of Butuan, together with some natives and Spaniards visited the place. They expanded their visits not only the coastal areas where flourishing because of the abundance of fish. At the top of the hill they saw the village overlooking the sea. They appreciated the beauty of nature in abundance. They exclaimed "Bien Vista", which means "Good View" thus the present name Buenavista.

Enticed by the abundance of fish and the good prospect for agriculture, a new wave migrants from the neighboring areas continued to flock to Buenavista. Between the years 1897–1907, settlers and their families were known to have settled in the place.

The only means of transportation was by banca or fishing boats, and by horseback trudging the small mountain trails. It was only sometime in the 1920s when Buenavista was connected to Butuan by means of road. It was also given power by the Marcon Electric Company of the Marcon family but later on, operation was taken over by the government-owned electric distribution facility.

Efforts of the pioneers paid off, because sometime in early 1920s, Buenavista was declared a regular barrio of the then Municipality of Butuan. As a barrio, Buenavista was able to form its own law-making body which was locally called Ang Tingug Sa Lungsod, whose members were known as podientes.

"Municipality of Buenavista" through the efforts of Assemblyman Apolonio D. Curato and Governor Jose R. Rosales, Commissioner of Mindanao and Sulu Teofisto Guingona Sr., and Secretary of the Interior, Elpidio Quirino, with a set of appointed officials to serve for a period of one year.

== Geography ==
According to the Philippine Statistics Authority, the municipality has a land area of 475.61 square kilometres (183.63 sq mi) constituting 17.42% of the 2,730.24-square-kilometre- (1,054.15 sq mi) total area of Agusan del Norte.

=== Climate ===
Climate data for Buenavista, Agusan del Norte
Month	Jan	Feb	Mar	Apr	May	Jun	Jul	Aug	Sep	Oct	Nov	Dec	Year
Mean daily maximum °C (°F)	28 (82)	28 (82)	28 (82)	30 (86)	30 (86)	30 (86)	30 (86)	30 (86)	30 (86)	30 (86)	29 (84)	28 (82)	29 (85)
Mean daily minimum °C (°F)	23 (73)	23 (73)	23 (73)	23 (73)	24 (75)	25 (77)	24 (75)	25 (77)	25 (77)	24 (75)	24 (75)	24 (75)	24 (75)
Average precipitation mm (inches)	277 (10.9)	211 (8.3)	155 (6.1)	109 (4.3)	166 (6.5)	191 (7.5)	154 (6.1)	138 (5.4)	127 (5.0)	173 (6.8)	241 (9.5)	231 (9.1)	2,173 (85.5)
Average rainy days	22.7	19.1	20.0	19.9	25.9	27.6	27.6	26.1	25.1	26.8	24.3	23.1	288.2
Source: Meteoblue

=== Barangays ===
Buenavista is politically subdivided into 25 barangays. Each barangay consists of puroks while some have sitios.

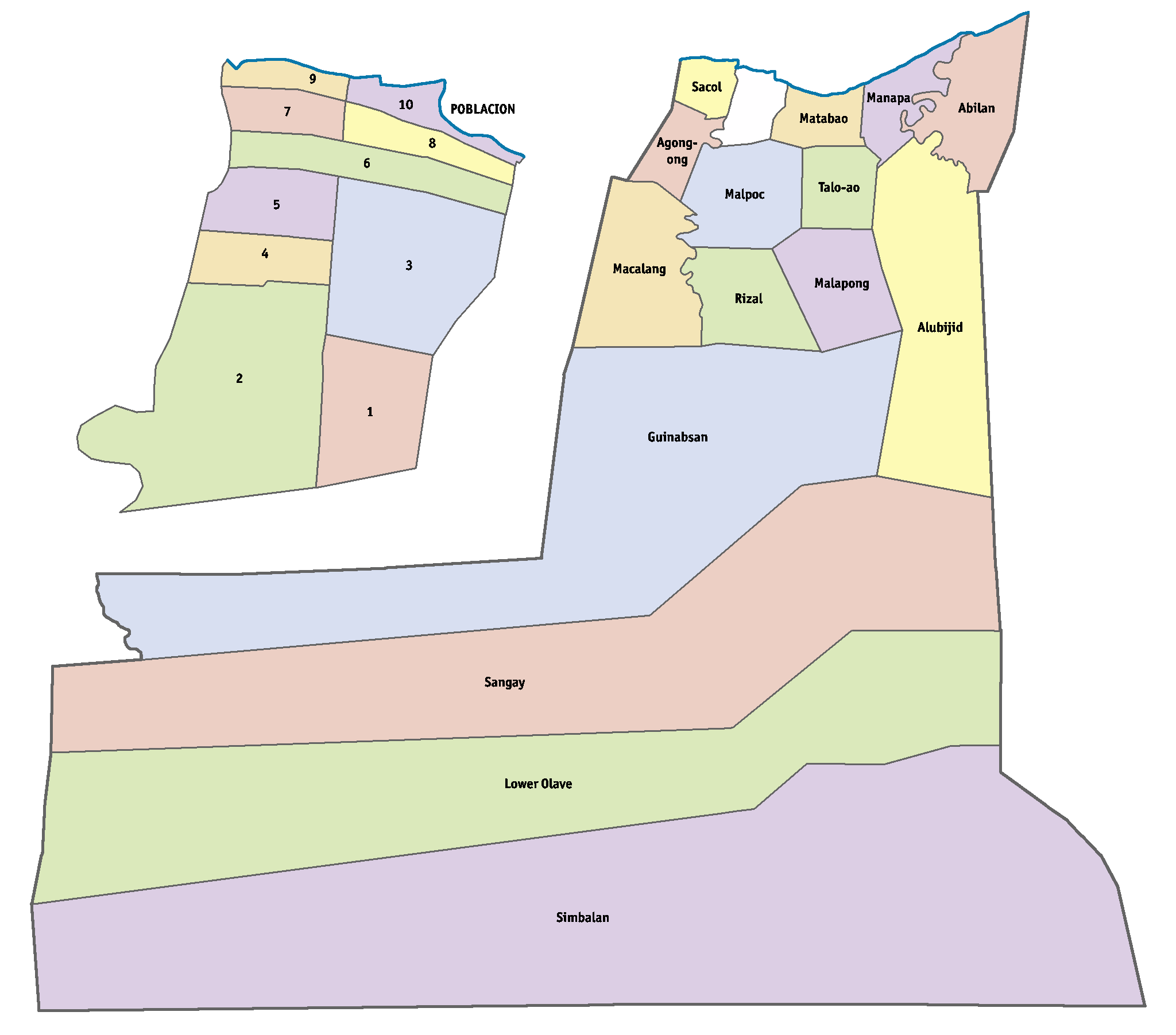
Political map of Buenavista

PSGC	Barangay	Population			±% p.a.	
		2024		2010		
160201001	Abilan	3.9%	2,769	2,118	▴	1.88%
160201002	Agong-ong	2.2%	1,531	1,360	▴	0.83%
160201003	Alubijid	4.6%	3,259	2,970	▴	0.65%
160201004	Guinabsan	5.4%	3,833	3,456	▴	0.72%
160201027	Lower Olave	2.4%	1,688	1,506	▴	0.80%
160201007	Macalang	2.9%	2,037	1,728	▴	1.15%
160201008	Malapong	2.3%	1,661	1,651	▴	0.04%
160201009	Malpoc	2.2%	1,567	1,602	▾	−0.15%
160201010	Manapa	7.2%	5,074	4,280	▴	1.19%
160201011	Matabao	6.0%	4,268	3,727	▴	0.95%
160201013	Poblacion 1	3.1%	2,216	1,939	▴	0.93%
160201022	Poblacion 2	3.5%	2,481	2,502	▾	−0.06%
160201014	Poblacion 3	2.0%	1,435	1,390	▴	0.22%
160201015	Poblacion 4	4.7%	3,351	3,402	▾	−0.10%
160201016	Poblacion 5	2.5%	1,780	1,639	▴	0.58%
160201017	Poblacion 6	1.6%	1,099	1,052	▴	0.30%
160201018	Poblacion 7	2.5%	1,783	1,609	▴	0.72%
160201019	Poblacion 8	1.5%	1,060	1,099	▾	−0.25%
160201020	Poblacion 9	1.5%	1,043	1,208	▾	−1.02%
160201021	Poblacion 10	2.1%	1,484	1,505	▾	−0.10%
160201023	Rizal	4.7%	3,329	2,808	▴	1.19%
160201024	Sacol	4.3%	3,038	2,841	▴	0.47%
160201025	Sangay	5.4%	3,815	3,253	▴	1.11%
160201028	Simbalan	5.9%	4,188	3,853	▴	0.58%
160201026	Talo-ao	2.6%	1,825	1,641	▴	0.74%
	Total		70,691	56,139	▴	1.62%

== Demographics ==
Population census of Buenavista
Year	Pop.	±% p.a.
1939	11,236	—
1948	12,194	+0.91%
1960	17,927	+3.26%
1970	24,753	+3.28%
1975	28,682	+3.00%
1980	31,531	+1.91%
1990	39,331	+2.24%
1995	45,011	+2.56%
2000	50,612	+2.55%
2007	53,059	+0.65%
2010	56,139	+2.07%
2015	61,614	+1.79%
2020	68,892	+2.38%
2024	70,691	+0.62%
Source: Philippine Statistics Authority

In the 2024 census, Buenavista had a population of 70,691. The population density was 150 inhabitants per square kilometre (390/sq mi).

== Economy ==
JP Satorre Gymnasium

Poverty incidence of Buenavista (%)

Source: Philippine Statistics Authority

== Education ==
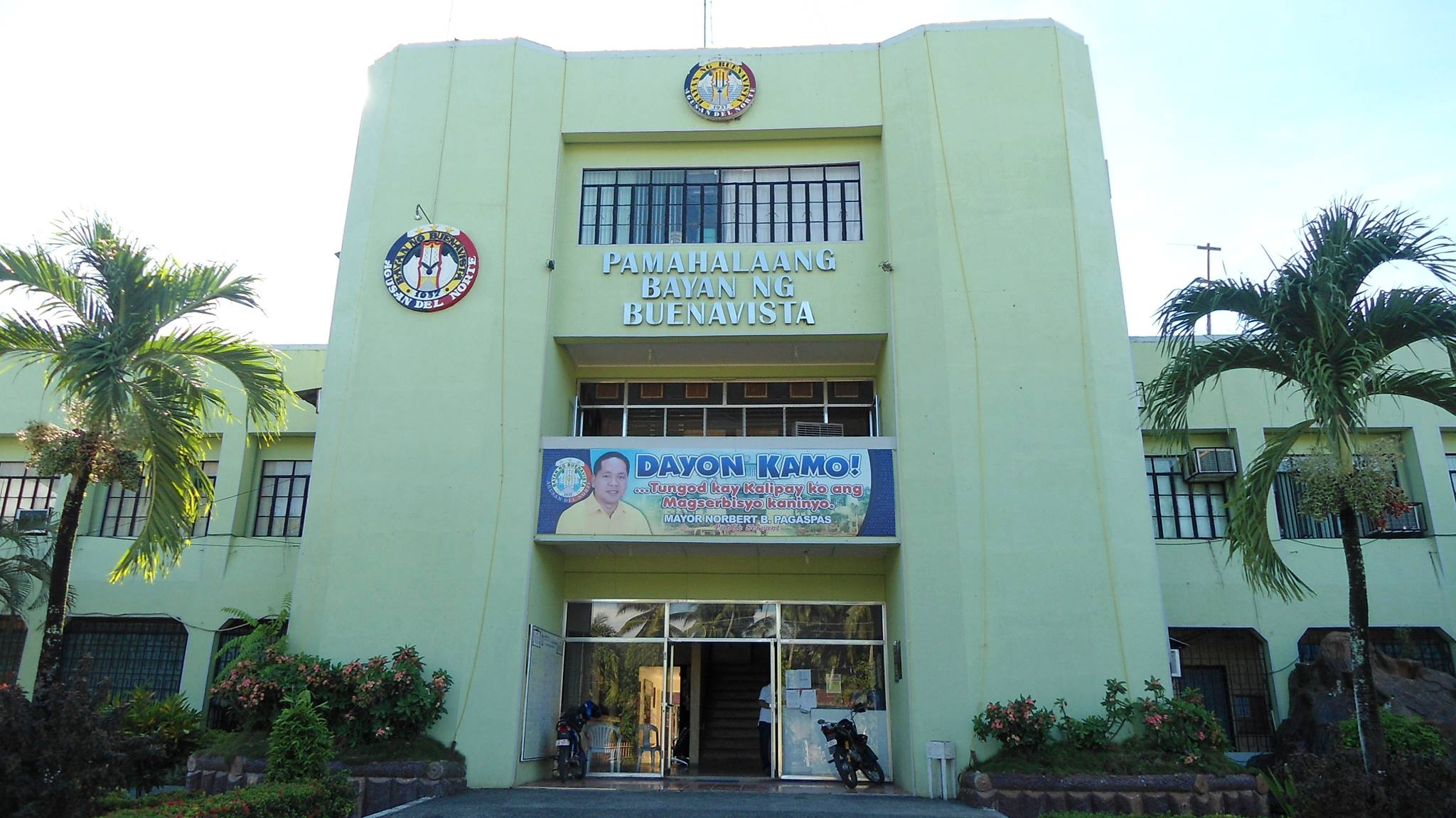
Municipal hall

=== Elementary ===
- Abilan Elementary School
- Agong-ong Elementary School
- Bagang Elementary School
- Buenavista Central Elementary School
- Buenavista Institute (Grade School)
- Buenavista Special Education Elementary School
- Calaitan Elementary School
- Cogon Elementary School
- Dalao-an Elementary School
- Datu Saldong Elementary School
- F.S. OMAYANA Elementary School
- Guinabsan Elementary School
- Kabalalahan Elementary School
- Labong Elementary School
- Lekda Elementary School
- Linao-linao Elementary School
- Lomboyan Elementary School
- Lower Olave Elementary School
- Macalang Elementary School
- Malapong Elementary School
- Malpoc Elementary School
- Manapa Elementary School
- Manapa IS (Grade School)
- Matabao Elementary School
- Monteverde Elementary School
- New Bohol Elementary School
- Rizal Elementary School
- Sacol Elementary School
- San juan Elementary School
- San Roque Elementary School
- Sangay Elementary School
- SPED Elementary School
- Simbalan Elementary School
- Talo-ao Elementary School
- Tanutao Elementary School
- Tapnigue Elementary School
- TINAGO Elementary School
- Upper Olave Elementary School

=== Secondary ===
- Abilan IS
- Agong-ong IS
- FS Omayana Elementary School (Alubihid)
- FS Omayana National High School (Alubihid)
- Buenavista Institute
- Buenavista National High School
- Buenavista SPED- High School
- Card MRI High School
- Guinabsan National High School
- Lekda National High School
- Manapa ISS
- Rizal IS
- Saint James High School
- Sangay National High School
- Simbalan National High School
