= Dale Corvera =

Filipino politician

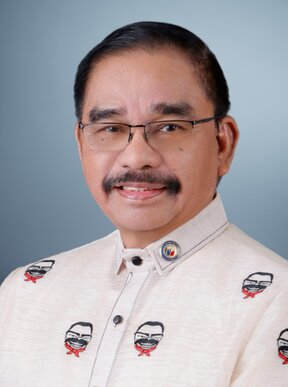
- Official portrait, 2025

Member of the Philippine House of Representatives from Agusan del Norte
- Incumbent
- Assumed office June 30, 2022
- Preceded by: Angelica Amante
- Constituency: 2nd district (2022–2025); At-large district (2025–present)

6th Governor of Agusan del Norte
- In office June 30, 2019 – June 30, 2022
- Vice Governor: Ramon Bungabong
- Preceded by: Angelica Amante
- Succeeded by: Angelica Amante

Mayor of Cabadbaran
- In office June 30, 2007 – June 30, 2016
- Preceded by: Herman M. Libarnes
- Succeeded by: Katrina Marie O. Mortola

Vice Governor of Agusan del Norte
- In office June 30, 2004 – June 30, 2007
- Governor: Erlpe John Amante
- Preceded by: Roberto Tejano
- Succeeded by: Enrico Corvera

Personal details
- Party: PFP (2026–present)
- Other political affiliations: Lakas (2007–2010; 2023–2026); PDP–Laban (2016–2023); Liberal (2010–2016)
- Spouse: Nanceli Ayo Corvera
- Children: 3
- Education: Southwestern University

Dale Bokingo Corvera is a Filipino politician who has served as a representative from Agusan del Norte since 2022. He previously served as governor of Agusan del Norte from 2019 to 2022.

He is also an elected member and chairperson of the World Organization of the Scout Movement, Asia Pacific Regional Committee, and Immediate past National President of the Boy Scouts of the Philippines. He was elected as Governor of the province in 2019. He served as mayor of Cabadbaran from 2007 to 2016, vice governor of the same Province from 2004 to 2007, board member from 1995 to 2004, and Municipal Councilor from 1992 to 1995.

House of Representatives of the Philippines
Preceded by District recreated from Agusan del Norte's 1st and 2nd districts	Representative, Lone District of Agusan del Norte; 2025–present	Incumbent
Preceded by Angelica Amante	Representative, 2nd District of Agusan del Norte; 2022–2025	Succeeded by District dissolved into Agusan del Norte's at-large district
Political offices
Preceded by Angelica Amante	Governor of Agusan del Norte; 2019–2022	Succeeded by Angelica Amante
Preceded by Herman M. Libarnes	Mayor of Cabadbaran; 2007–2016	Succeeded by Katrina Marie O. Mortola
