= Las Nieves, Agusan del Norte =

Municipality in Agusan del Norte, Philippines

Las Nieves
- Municipality
- Municipality of Las Nieves
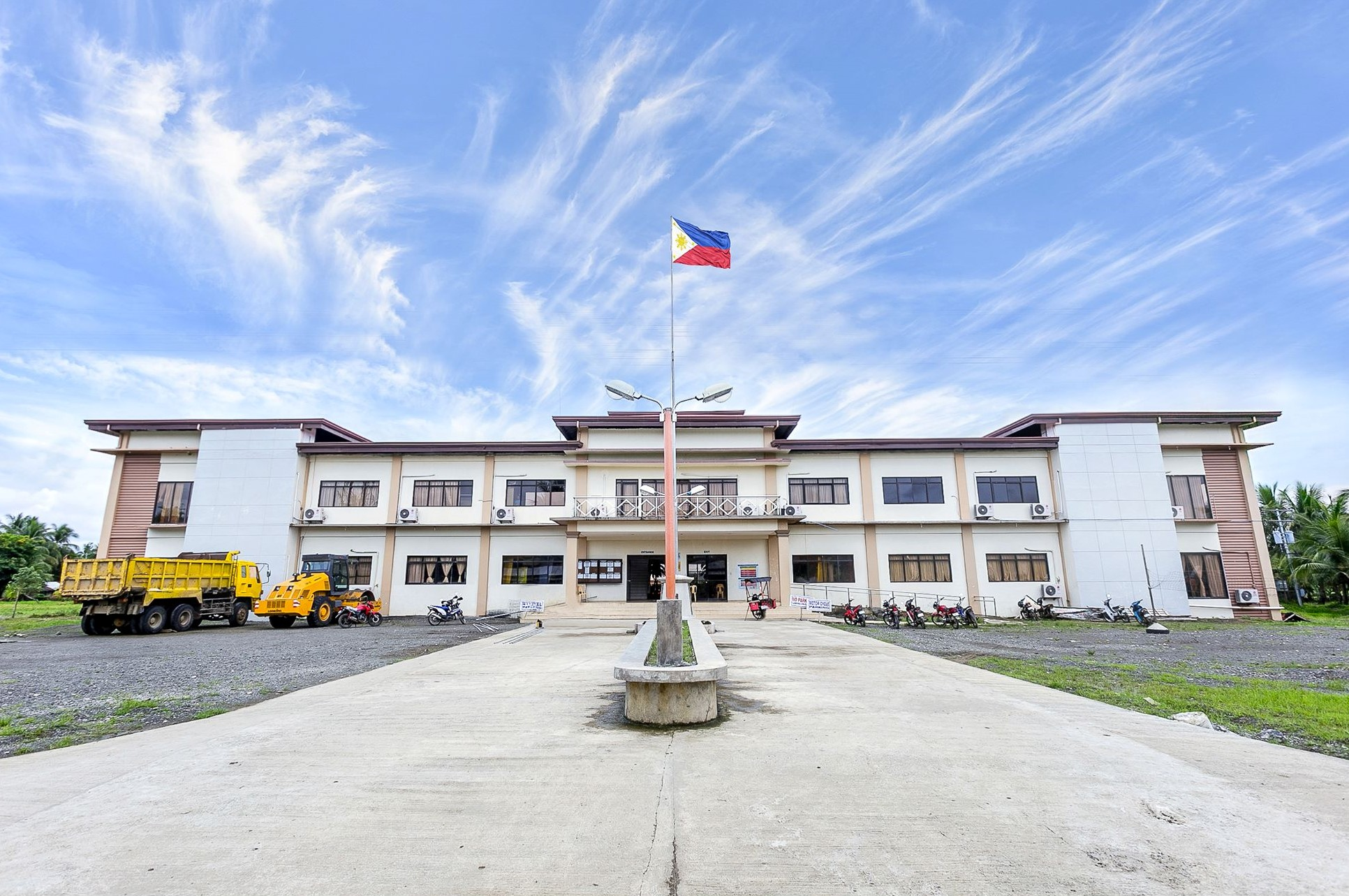
- Municipal Hall

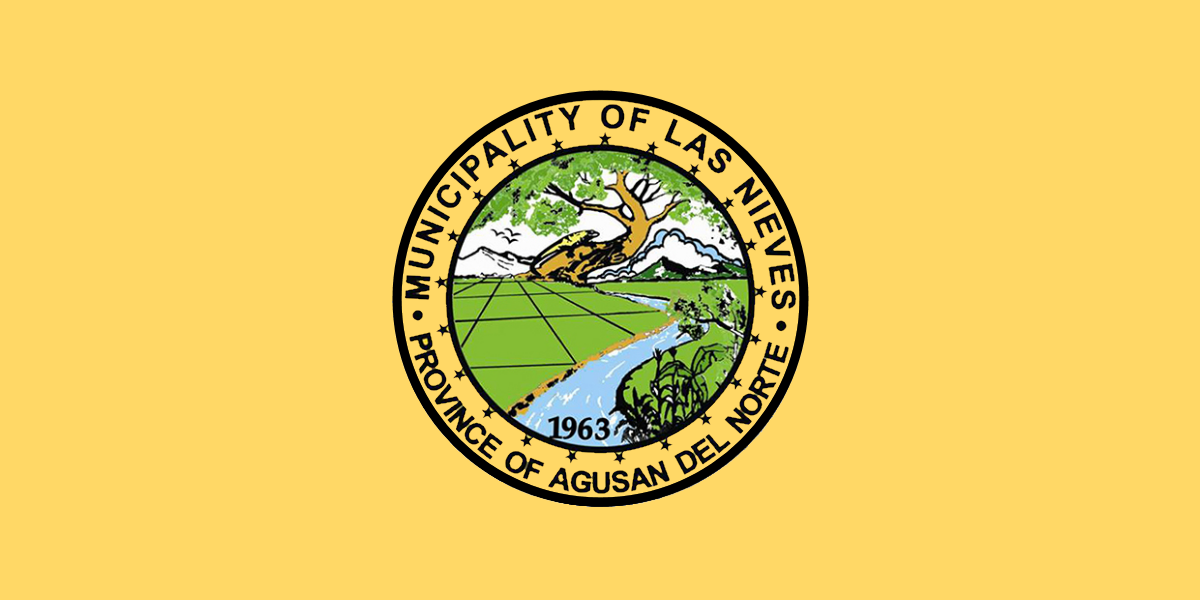
- Flag

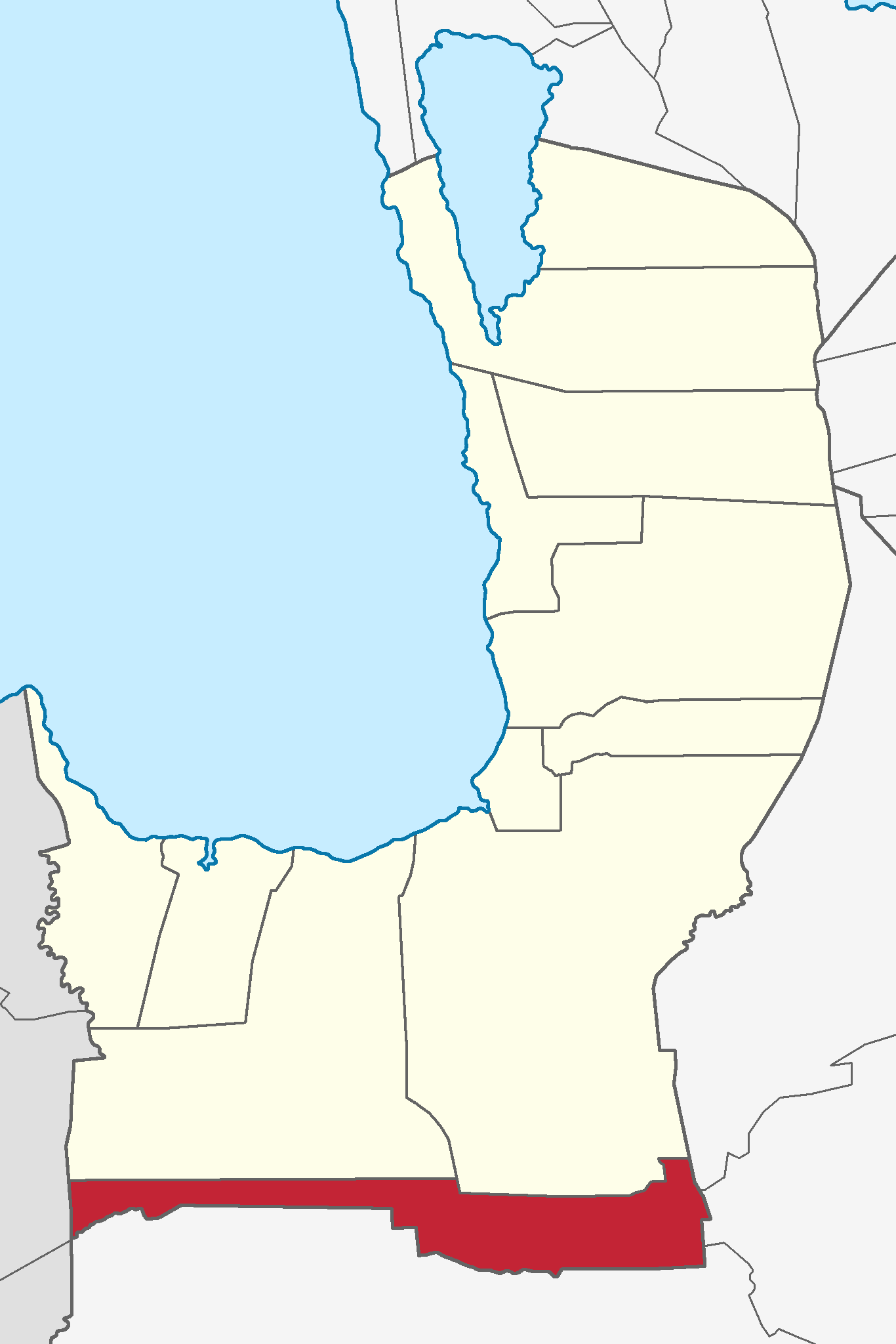
- Map of Agusan del Norte with Las Nieves highlighted
- Interactive map of Las Nieves
- Location within the Philippines
- Coordinates: 8°44′N 125°36′E
- Country: Philippines
- Region: Caraga
- Province: Agusan del Norte
- District: Lone district
- Barangays: 20 (see Barangays)

Government
  - Type: Sangguniang Bayan
  - Mayor: Karen S. Rosales
  - Vice Mayor: Avelina S. Rosales
  - Representative: Dale Corvera
  - Municipal Council: Members: Florante G. Largo; Rodrigo B. Calang; Reinario P. Rosales; Francisco G. Namuag Jr.; Jacinto T. Fabro Sr.; Joventino N. Manliguez; Antonio N. Jongko; Jessica H. Navarroza
  - Electorate: 21,354 voters (2025)

Area
  - Total: 582.69 km^{2} (224.98 sq mi)
- Elevation: 31 m (102 ft)
- Highest elevation: 155 m (509 ft)
- Lowest elevation: 7 m (23 ft)

Population (2024 census)
  - Total: 32,402
  - Density: 55.608/km^{2} (144.02/sq mi)
  - Households: 6,513

Economy
  - Income class: 1st municipal income class
  - Poverty incidence: 35.51% (2023)
  - Revenue: ₱ 275.6 million (2024)
  - Assets: ₱ 671.1 million (2024)
  - Expenditure: ₱ 244.7 million (2024)
  - Liabilities: ₱ 100.3 million (2024)

Service provider
  - Electricity: Agusan del Norte Electric Cooperative (ANECO)
- Time zone: UTC+8 (PST)
- ZIP code: 8610
- PSGC: 1600207000
- IDD : area code: +63 (0)85
- Native languages: Agusan; Butuanon; Cebuano; Higaonon; Tagalog
- Website: www.lasnievesadn.gov.ph

Las Nieves (Spanish for 'The Snows'), officially the Municipality of Las Nieves (Cebuano: Lungsod sa Las Nieves; Tagalog: Bayan ng Las Nieves), is a municipality in the province of Agusan del Norte, Philippines. According to the 2024 census, it has a population of 32,402 people.

== History ==
=== Foundation ===
The first traders to enter Las Nieves were natives of Butuan City. They used to travel along the Agusan River in wooden dug-out boats or baoto using a long paddle called ga-o. The Manobo and Higaonon tribes which include the Jovellar, Tepnage, Bayan, Legis, Taga-ang and Kulisan were the first dominant families in the area. Respected warriors, or bagani, such as Dagohoy and Kulisan were considered influential leaders.

The Manobo and Higaonon peoples traditionally used bags made from woven abaca fibers, known as camuyot, to carry their belongings. Their customary forms of entertainment included traditional war dances such as kalasag, as well as ceremonial dances like binaylan, inamo, and binanog. These performances were often accompanied by the agong, a musical instrument believed to have been made of pure gold.

In the year 1875, on orders from the Bishop of Cebu, a group of Spanish Jesuit Missionaries disembarked at the Port of Butuan. Although they were not the first missionaries to arrive, as Augustinian Recollects had been here before them, their coming promised something different, for they intended to do more than maintain the parishes that the Roman Catholic Church have established. The Jesuits wanted to civilize the province by converting the beliefs of local residents, the Manobo and the Higaonon into Christianity. They also wanted to establish the locals in villages where they could be taught the rudiments of religion, education and self-government.

It was in February 1877 that Father Saturnino Urios, with two other Jesuit Missionaries, Father Ramon Pamies and Father Jose Casellas, announced the beginning of their mission to preach the gospel to the natives. They traversed the length and breadth of the Agusan Valley, its main river, and all its known tributaries, risking death from malarial mosquito, leeches and inhospitable tribal chieftains or datus. However, Father Urios and his companions persisted in their quest. It is to him and his fellow Jesuits that we owe the founding and early history of Las Nieves, which was about a day's paddling upstream from Butuan.

The Jesuit missionaries paddled upstream and passed by the rancherías of Bugabus, Danquias and Pinanaan. Rancherias were small scattered settlements of Manobo clans along Agusan River.

In April 1877, Father Urios reported to his superior in Manila the successful founding of five villages along the Agusan River. The villages were Las Nieves, Remedios, Esperanza, Guadalupe and San Luis.

Las Nieves, the area that Father Urios founded first, was formerly named Pinana-an, or, a place for hunting, as it was called by its early inhabitants. The natives or Manobos used to catch wild pigs, birds, fishes and other animals with their bows and arrows or panâ here.

According to local tradition, upon arriving in the community, Father Urios and his companions were struck by the unusually cold conditions. When they awoke, the valley was enveloped in thick fog and intense chill, giving the impression of falling snow. The scene reminded Father Urios of his hometown in Játiva, Spain, near Valencia, prompting them to exclaim, “¡La nieve! ¡La nieve!” (“The snow! The snow!”).

With its vast agricultural land, alluvial plains stretching up to the mountains and its cool weather, Las Nieves most closely resembled the home region of Father Urios in Jativa. It is of great significance that in honor of their patroness, the Nuestra Señora de Las Nieves or Our Lady of the Snow, he named this place Las Nieves.

There was no doubt whatsoever that Las Nieves was very close to Fr. Urios' heart. He never failed to mention it in his numerous letters and reports to his superiors in Manila, that Las Nieves was never a source of sorrow or anxiety. It was unlike other towns and villages where killings, barbaric practices and uncivilized deeds were rampant.

No doubt this same legacy of peace has persisted. A convert named Jose Domingo, formerly a notorious bagani, was named gobernadorcillo or the equivalent of a mayor in present times. In 1890, a flotilla was prepared at Butuan and set out with eight bancas. It was a trip of jubilation and they performed baptisms along the way in Amparo, Las Nieves, Esperanza, Verdu and Remedios.

Father Urios repeatedly travelled in the jungles of Agusan that he suffered fevers and illnesses. In 1891, malaria forced him to go to Manila to rest and to recover. He returned to Agusan to visit before leaving for Tagoloan, Misamis, in preparation for his transfer to Davao.

He ended his Agusan mission with numerous accomplishments. After his death in October 1916, the loyal Roman Catholics in Butuan renamed the Butuan Parochial School to Father Urios College (now Father Saturnino Urios University) to honor the memory of the great Jesuit Missionary. Moreover, such honor was not deprived from him in his own hometown in Jativa, Spain and in Las Nieves. For there are only two places in the world which bears Father Urios’ name; Urios Street and Plaza in Jativa and Urios Street in Poblacion, Las Nieves.

=== Later developments ===
In 1943, Las Nieves became the headquarters of the Agusan 110th and 113th Infantry Division during the battle in Walao, Loreto, Agusan del Sur. Right after the battle, it was constituted as a Municipal District under the Municipality of Esperanza. The appointed officials were Bonifacio Jovellar, Canuto Calo, Eufronio Rosales, Lino Jovellar and Celso Torralba as mayor.

Eufronio Rosales was first elected mayor in 1955 under the political lineup of Congressman Guillermo R. Sanchez. He later became the first municipal mayor following the creation of the Municipality of Las Nieves through a Republic Act on July 2, 1962. The municipality was formally separated from Esperanza on June 25, 1963, by virtue of Executive Order No. 42 issued by President Diosdado Macapagal.

On 27 March 2021, over 304 NPA militiamen and supporters of the New People's Army surrendered at Las Nieves in Barangay Ibuan to the Philippine Government, dismantling the rebels' key support in the area.

== Geography ==
According to the Philippine Statistics Authority, the municipality has a land area of 582.69 square kilometres (224.98 sq mi) constituting 21.34% of the 2,730.24-square-kilometre- (1,054.15 sq mi) total area of Agusan del Norte.

Las Nieves is bounded by Butuan and Buenavista, Agusan del Norte to the north, municipality of Sibagat, Agusan del Sur to the northeast, Bayugan to the east, municipality of Esperanza, Agusan del Sur to the south and municipality of Claveria, Misamis Oriental to the west.

=== Climate ===
Climate data for Las Nieves, Agusan del Norte
Month	Jan	Feb	Mar	Apr	May	Jun	Jul	Aug	Sep	Oct	Nov	Dec	Year
Mean daily maximum °C (°F)	28 (82)	28 (82)	29 (84)	30 (86)	30 (86)	30 (86)	30 (86)	30 (86)	30 (86)	30 (86)	29 (84)	28 (82)	29 (85)
Mean daily minimum °C (°F)	23 (73)	23 (73)	22 (72)	23 (73)	24 (75)	24 (75)	24 (75)	24 (75)	24 (75)	24 (75)	24 (75)	23 (73)	24 (74)
Average precipitation mm (inches)	154 (6.1)	101 (4.0)	78 (3.1)	59 (2.3)	95 (3.7)	130 (5.1)	131 (5.2)	137 (5.4)	125 (4.9)	145 (5.7)	141 (5.6)	121 (4.8)	1,417 (55.9)
Average rainy days	17.4	13.9	14.4	14.3	22.3	26.0	27.9	27.5	26.2	26.4	21.4	17.2	254.9
Source: Meteoblue

=== Barangays ===
Las Nieves is politically subdivided into 20 barangays. Each barangay consists of puroks while some have sitios.

Barangay Casiklan was created in 2000.

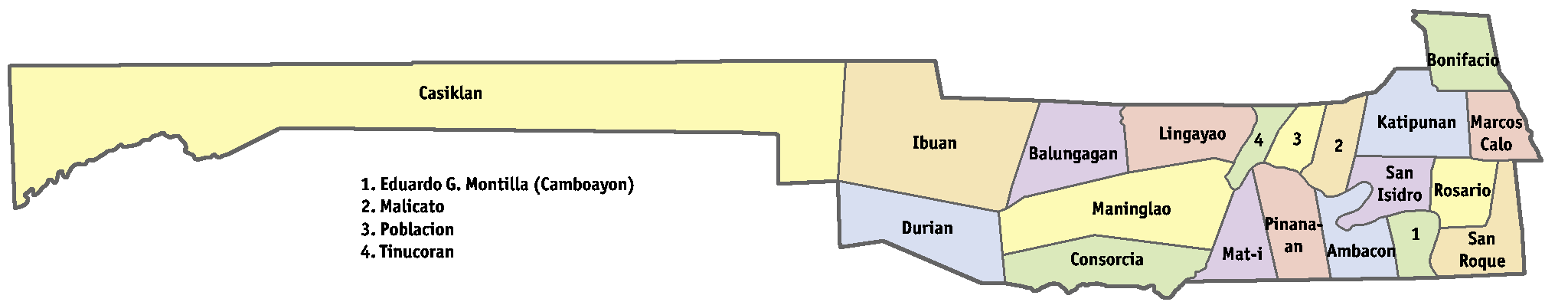
Political map of Las Nieves

PSGC	Barangay	Population			±% p.a.	
		2024		2010		
160207001	Ambacon	4.3%	1,395	1,144	▴	1.38%
160207015	Balungagan	2.5%	814	770	▴	0.38%
160207002	Bonifacio	4.9%	1,585	1,544	▴	0.18%
160207021	Casiklan	6.4%	2,066	1,923	▴	0.50%
160207003	Consorcia	3.9%	1,276	1,337	▾	−0.32%
160207017	Durian	6.4%	2,085	1,774	▴	1.12%
160207016	Eduardo G. Montilla (Camboayon)	4.2%	1,372	1,195	▴	0.96%
160207018	Ibuan	3.5%	1,134	1,146	▾	−0.07%
160207004	Katipunan	3.2%	1,031	1,121	▾	−0.58%
160207005	Lingayao	8.3%	2,687	2,419	▴	0.73%
160207006	Malicato	3.3%	1,084	1,044	▴	0.26%
160207007	Maningalao	4.7%	1,527	1,450	▴	0.36%
160207008	Marcos Calo	3.4%	1,100	1,098	▴	0.01%
160207009	Mat-i	6.4%	2,081	2,006	▴	0.25%
160207010	Pinana-an	4.7%	1,515	1,472	▴	0.20%
160207011	Poblacion	4.4%	1,428	1,315	▴	0.57%
160207019	Rosario	4.6%	1,484	1,344	▴	0.69%
160207013	San Isidro	3.7%	1,195	1,250	▾	−0.31%
160207020	San Roque	1.7%	551	510	▴	0.54%
160207014	Tinucoran	3.1%	1,004	994	▴	0.07%
	Total		32,402	26,856	▴	1.30%

== Demographics ==
Population census of Las Nieves
Year	Pop.	±% p.a.
1918	388	—
1939	803	+3.52%
1948	1,888	+9.96%
1960	4,262	+7.02%
1970	6,782	+4.75%
1975	8,609	+4.90%
1980	10,757	+4.55%
1990	15,409	+3.66%
1995	22,966	+7.76%
2000	21,530	−1.37%
2007	25,203	+2.20%
2010	26,856	+2.34%
2015	28,414	+1.08%
2020	30,240	+1.32%
2024	32,402	+1.67%
Source: Philippine Statistics Authority

In the 2024 census, Las Nieves had a population of 32,402. The population density was 56 inhabitants per square kilometre (150/sq mi).

== Economy ==
Poverty incidence of Las Nieves (%)

Source: Philippine Statistics Authority
