= Boguko River =

River in Agusan del Sur, Philippines

- Boguko River mouth Boguko River (Philippines)
- Native name: Ilog Boguko (Tagalog)

Location
- Country: Philippines
- Region: Caraga
- Province: Agusan del Sur
- Municipality: Sibagat

Physical characteristics
- Source
  - location: Sibagat, Agusan del Sur, Caraga Region
- Mouth: Wawa River
  - location: Magsaysay, Sibagat, Agusan del Sur
- Length: 10 km (6.2 mi)
- Basin size: 8 km^{2} (3.1 sq mi)
- Discharge
  - location: Wawa River
  - average: 38 m^{3}/s (1,300 cu ft/s)

Basin features
- Progression: Boguko–Wawa–Agusan

The Boguko River (Tagalog: Ilog Boguko; Cebuano: Suba sa Boguko) is a stream located in Sibagat, Agusan del Sur, Caraga Region, Philippines. It is a tributary of the larger Wawa River with headwaters located in the mountain boundaries of Sibagat and the Province of Surigao del Sur.

== Etymology ==
The Boguko River got its name from the native word bagako, which means "mysterious". According to oral history from early inhabitants of the place, mostly Manobos, the place where the river is located had made few stories of mysterious disappearance of people and animals, which is why they called the place Bagako. Variant forms and spelling of Bagako or in other native languages exist such as Bagoko and its present name Boguko.

== Geography ==
The Boguko River is situated approximately 8.779840, 125.711982 in the island of Mindanao. Terrain elevation at these coordinates is estimated 719 metres above sea level.

The Boguko River headwaters originate from the Diwata Mountain Range of Barangays Banagbanag and New Tubigon where its mouth located in Barangay Magsaysay joins with the larger Wawa River. The Wawa River is the largest and longest river in the town and a tributary river to the Agusan River.

== Crossings ==
In early years, a logging company operating on that area constructed an access road and built a highly elevated detour bridge that crossed the Boguko River and they named it "Boguko Bridge". The bridge connects the villages of Sitio San Roque of Barangay Magsaysay to Sitio Kahayag of Barangay Banagbanag. The said access road and bridge are now part of the Butuan–Kolambugan–Tandag Road.

== See also ==
- Agusan River
- Wawa River (Agusan del Sur)
- Andanan River
- Sibagat River
- Sibagat, Agusan del Sur
- Agusan del Sur Province
- List of rivers of the Philippines
