= Sibagat River =

River in Agusan del Sur, Philippines

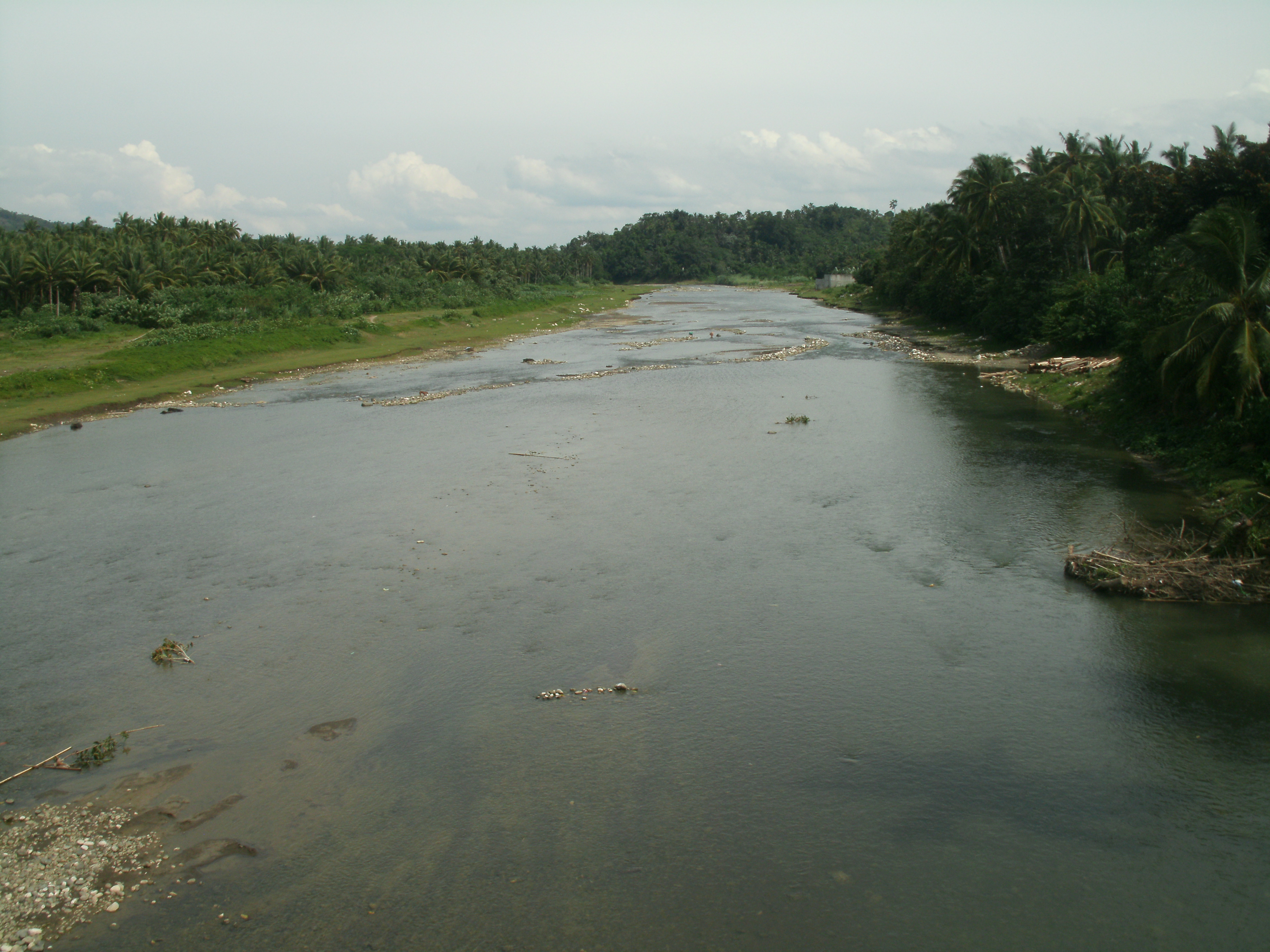
- Sibagat River in Sibagat, Agusan del Sur

- Sibagat River mouth Sibagat River (Philippines)
- Native name: Ilog Sibagat (Tagalog)

Location
- Country: Philippines
- Region: Caraga
- Province: Agusan del Sur
- Municipality: Sibagat

Physical characteristics
- Source
  - location: Sibagat, Agusan del Sur, Caraga Region
- Mouth: Wawa River
  - location: Poblacion, Sibagat, Agusan del Sur
  - coordinates: 8°49′45″N 125°41′52″E
- Length: 24 km (15 mi)
- Basin size: 12 km^{2} (4.6 sq mi)
- Discharge
  - location: Wawa River
  - average: 38 m^{3}/s (1,300 cu ft/s)

Basin features
- Progression: Sibagat–Wawa–Agusan

The Sibagat River (Tagalog: Ilog Sibagat; Cebuano: Suba sa Sibagat) is a stream located in Sibagat, Agusan del Sur, Caraga Region, Philippines. It is a tributary of the larger Wawa River with headwaters located in the northeastern mountain boundaries of Sibagat and Butuan.

== Etymology ==
The Sibagat River is named after its town's name Sibagat that comes from the word bagat which means meet or meeting place. According to oral history, the Sibagat River is the place where warring tribes met and fought. The losing tribe would retreat downstream to the Wawa River and disappear.

== Geography ==
The Sibagat River headwaters originate from the hinterlands of Barangay Pianing in Butuan and traverses along the riverbank barangay of Bugsukan, also in Butuan, and the barangays of Tabontabon, Afga, El Rio, Mahayahay and Poblacion in Sibagat where its mouth located in Sitio Sabang met with the larger Wawa River. The Wawa River is the largest river in the town and a tributary river to the Agusan River.

== Crossings ==
There are three permanent bridges that cross the Sibagat River

- Camponay Bridge – Brgy. Tabontabon, connecting the road linking NRJ-Tabontabon to Sta. Maria-Sta. Cruz-Banagbanag-Perez Road
- Mahayahay Bridge – Brgy. Mahayahay, connecting the road linking NRJ-Mahayahay to Del Rosario-San Isidro-Magsaysay-Banagbanag-New Tubigon-Tandag Road
- Sibagat Bridge – Brgy. Poblacion, a steel bridge connecting the road linking NRJ-Sibagat to Villangit-San Isidro-Magsaysay-Banagbanag-New Tubigon-Tandag Road

== Tributaries ==
- Tambagoko River

== See also ==
- Agusan River
- Wawa River (Agusan del Sur)
- Tambagoko River
- Boguko River
- Andanan River
- Sibagat, Agusan del Sur
- Agusan del Sur Province
- List of rivers of the Philippines
