= Tambagoko River =

River in Agusan del Sur, Philippines

- Tambagoko River mouth Tambagoko River (Philippines)
- Native name: Ilog Tambagoko (Tagalog)

Location
- Country: Philippines
- Region: Caraga
- Province: Agusan del Sur
- Municipality: Sibagat

Physical characteristics
- Source
  - location: Sibagat, Agusan del Sur, Caraga Region
- Mouth: Sibagat River
  - location: Tabontabon, Sibagat, Agusan del Sur
  - coordinates: 8°54′04″N 125°39′52″E
- Length: 14 km (8.7 mi)
- Basin size: 12 km^{2} (4.6 sq mi)
- Discharge
  - location: Sibagat River
  - average: 23 m^{3}/s (810 cu ft/s)

Basin features
- Progression: Tambagoko–Sibagat River-Wawa–Agusan

The Tambagoko River (Tagalog: Ilog Tambagoko; Cebuano: Suba sa Tambagoko) is a stream located in Sibagat, Agusan del Sur, Caraga Region, Philippines. It is a tributary of the Sibagat River with headwaters located in the hinterlands of Barangays Perez and Sta. Cruz.

== Etymology ==
There were variant forms of names and spelling of Tambagoko River or in other native languages such like Tangbaguko, Tambugoko until its present name Tambagoko River.

== Geography ==
The Tambagoko River is situated approximately 8.91667, 125.7 in the island of Mindanao. Terrain elevation at these coordinates is estimated 413 metres above sea level.

The river streams from the mountainous areas of Barangays Perez, Sta. Cruz, Sta. Maria and Tabontabon where its mouth is located in Barangay Tabontabon joins with the Sibagat River. The Sibagat River is a tributary to the larger Wawa River.

== Land resources ==
The Tambagoko River including its surrounding areas comprising most of the barangays of Sibagat town was indexed by the Bureau of Soils and Water Management (BSWM) of the Department of Agriculture (Philippines) as one of the Land Resources Strategic Production Areas for Cacao production in the province of Agusan del Sur and Caraga Region.

== See also ==
- Agusan River
- Wawa River (Agusan del Sur)
- Sibagat River
- Sibagat, Agusan del Sur
- Agusan del Sur Province
- List of rivers of the Philippines
