= Sibagat =

Municipality in Agusan del Sur, Philippines

- Municipality
- Municipality of Sibagat
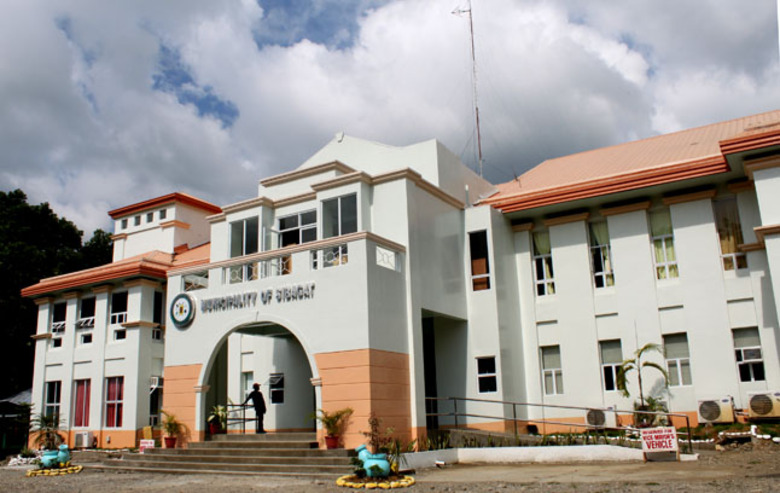
- Municipal Hall

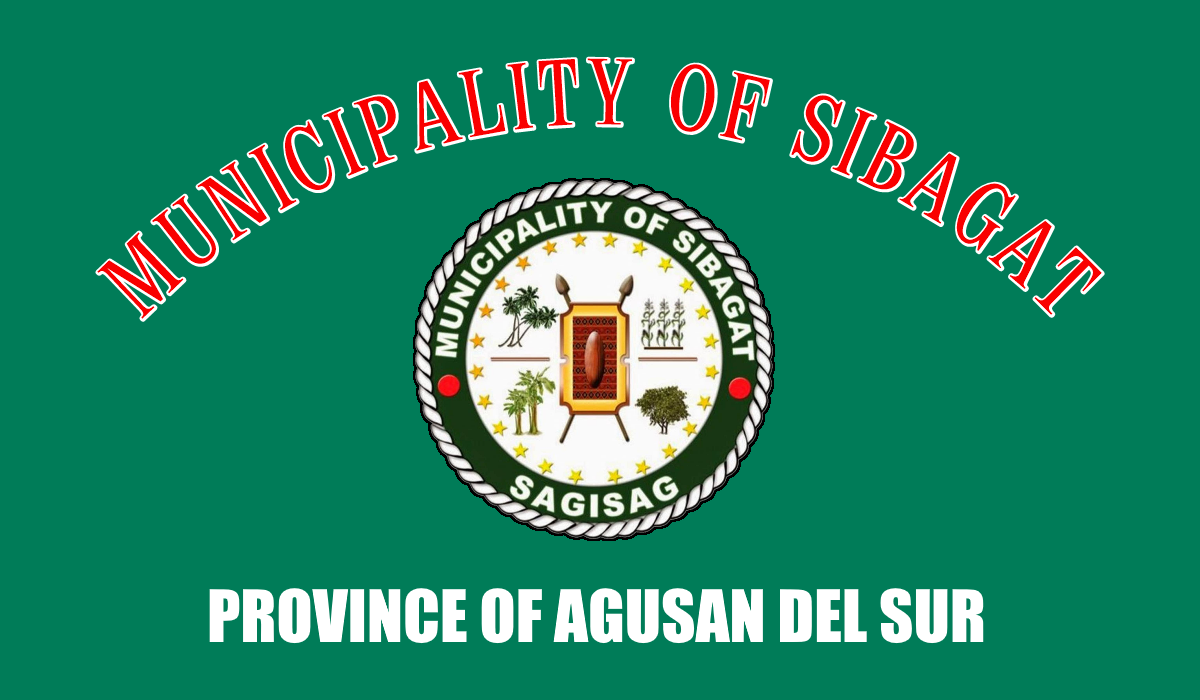
- Flag
- Nickname: The Last Frontier of Agusan del Sur
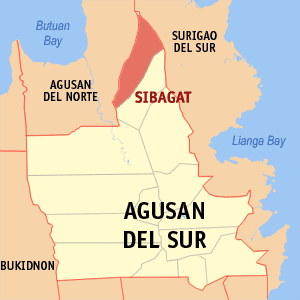
- Map of Agusan del Sur with Sibagat highlighted
- Interactive map of Sibagat
- Location within the Philippines
- Coordinates: 8°49′N 125°41′E
- Country: Philippines
- Region: Caraga
- Province: Agusan del Sur
- District: 1st district
- Barangays: 24 (see Barangays)

Government
  - Type: Sangguniang Bayan
  - Mayor: Dr. Thelma Gonzaga Lamanilao, MD
  - Vice Mayor: Maria Liza L. Evangelista
  - Representative: Alfelito M. Bascug
  - Electorate: 22,080 voters (2025)

Area
  - Total: 567.82 km^{2} (219.24 sq mi)
- Elevation: 352 m (1,155 ft)
- Highest elevation: 1,904 m (6,247 ft)
- Lowest elevation: 0 m (0 ft)

Population (2024 census)
  - Total: 33,271
  - Density: 58.594/km^{2} (151.76/sq mi)
  - Households: 7,794

Economy
  - Income class: 1st municipal income class
  - Poverty incidence: 31.85% (2023)
  - Revenue: ₱ 287.5 million (2024)
  - Assets: ₱ 518.4 million (2024)
  - Expenditure: ₱ 284.1 million (2024)
  - Liabilities: ₱ 121.6 million (2024)

Service provider
  - Electricity: Agusan del Sur Electric Cooperative (ASELCO)
- Time zone: UTC+8 (PST)
- ZIP code: 8503
- PSGC: 1600314000
- IDD : area code: +63 (0)85
- Native languages: Agusan; Butuanon; Cebuano; Higaonon; Tagalog
- Website: www.sibagat.gov.ph

Sibagat, officially the Municipality of Sibagat (Cebuano: Lungsod ng Sibagat; Tagalog: Bayan ng Sibagat); is a municipality in the province of Agusan del Sur, Philippines. According to the 2024 census, it has a population of 33,271 people.

Located at the northernmost part of the province, the town is called as the "Gateway to Agusan del Sur" and "The Last Frontier of Agusan del Sur, and the newest town in Agusan del Sur, having been created in 1980.

The town is a major producer of agriculture products such as coconut, banana, vegetables, maize, cassava and especially abaca in the province.

== Etymology ==
The word Sibagat is from the word bagat which means "meet" or "meeting place". According to the oral history, the Sibagat River near Sibagat was the place where the warring tribes meet and fight. Sibagat River is a tributary of a bigger river, the Wawa River. The losing tribe would retreat downstream to the Wawa River and disappear.

== History ==
The territories of Sibagat were formerly part of the town of Esperanza, in the historical province of Agusan. In August 1961, through Executive Order No. 440, s. 1961, the barrios and sitios of Bayugan, Maygatasan, Nueva Sibagat, Verdo, Mambutay, Salvacion, Caridad, Sagmone, Calaitan, Sinadyap, Malindao, Noli and other adjacent barrios and sitios were separated from Esperanza and constituted into the newly created municipality of Bayugan. On February 1, 1980, Sibagat was created into a municipality when the barangays of Ilihan, Sinai, Sibagat, El Rio, Afga, Tabontabon, Perez, Magsaysay, Santa Cruz, Santa Maria, San Isidro, Villangit, Del Rosario, Anahauan, Mahayahay and San Vicente were segregated from the municipality of Bayugan and organized into the newly created town, through Batas Pambansa Blg. 56. The seat of Municipal Local Government is located in Barangay Sibagat, now called Barangay Poblacion. On November 6, 1980, the first set of Municipal Officials assumed office and Mr. Vicente B. Benigian, Sr. was the first appointed Municipal Mayor.

== Geography ==
According to the Philippine Statistics Authority, the municipality has a land area of 567.82 square kilometres (219.24 sq mi) constituting 5.68% of the 9,989.52-square-kilometre- (3,856.98 sq mi) total area of Agusan del Sur.

Sibagat is bordered by the Municipalities of Santiago, Agusan del Norte and Cantilan, Surigao del Sur to the north; Madrid, Surigao del Sur, Carmen, Surigao del Sur and Lanuza, Surigao del Sur to the northeast; City of Tandag and San Miguel, Surigao del Sur to the east; Bayugan to the south and southeast; Las Nieves, Agusan del Norte to the southwest; Butuan and Remedios T. Romualdez to the west; and Cabadbaran to the northwest.

Sibagat is 29 kilometres (18 mi) away from the Regional Center Hub of Caraga region and 34 kilometres (21 mi)from the nearest airport in Butuan. It is also 14 kilometres (8.7 mi) away from Bayugan, the only city of the province. The town is geographically situated between the two cities of Butuan and Bayugan.

=== Elevation ===
Sibagat is located at 8°49′N 125°41′E. Elevation of most areas of the municipality sit atop 100 meters above sea level (M.a.s.l.).

Starting from the 100 M.a.s.l.broad plains in the southern part; where the urban center located, most of the rural barangays are located through the hills in the central part and to the mountainous western part, mountains peaked at 1,000 meters above sea level were located at the northern part comprises 2 barangays of Kolambugan and Padiay.

=== Rivers and Streams ===
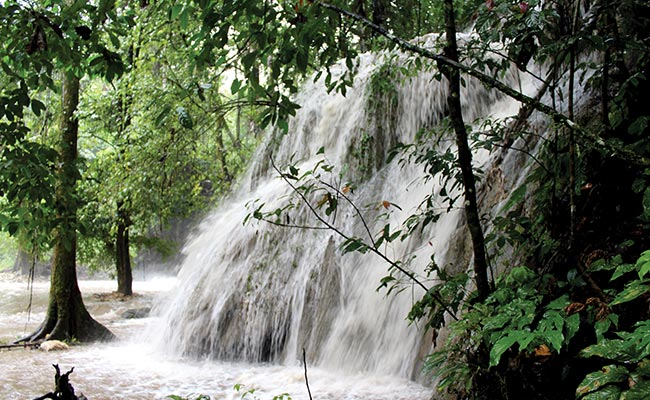
Pinandagatan Falls in Brgy. New Tubigon

Sibagat is host of several major rivers and streams that includes the Wawa River, the largest and longest river in the town. The other rivers are Sibagat River, Tambagoko River, Tago River, Andanan River, Boguko River, Bugsukan River, Balangubang River and Managong River.

=== Watershed ===
Andanan River and its surrounding areas was declared as a nature reserve called the Andanan Watershed Forest reserve (AWFR) proclaimed by virtue of Philippine Presidential Proclamation No. 734 dated May 29, 1991 with an area of 15,097 hectares located in Barangay New Tubigon in the municipality of Sibagat including some riverbank barangays in Bayugan area

Sibagat River and Wawa River and its surrounding areas were also declared a nature reserve by establishing the Sibagat-Wawa Forest Reserve (SWFR) as proclaimed by virtue of Philippine Presidential Proclamation No. 308 dated September 3, 1964 for wood production, watershed management, soil protection, and other forest uses containing an area of 29,500 hectares, more or less.

=== Climate ===
Sibagat has a Type II climate which has no dry season but with pronounced maximum rain period occurring from December to January. The climate is hot and moist with an average annual humidity of 84 percent. This type of climate is very regular with no dry months and lacks any seasonal contrast. Average annual temperature range is from 23 to 32 Celsius, with the temperatures dropping towards the west portion of the town while altitude is increasing.

Climate data for Sibagat, Agusan del Sur
Month	Jan	Feb	Mar	Apr	May	Jun	Jul	Aug	Sep	Oct	Nov	Dec	Year
Mean daily maximum °C (°F)	27 (81)	28 (82)	28 (82)	30 (86)	30 (86)	30 (86)	30 (86)	30 (86)	30 (86)	29 (84)	29 (84)	28 (82)	29 (84)
Mean daily minimum °C (°F)	23 (73)	22 (72)	22 (72)	22 (72)	24 (75)	24 (75)	24 (75)	24 (75)	24 (75)	24 (75)	23 (73)	23 (73)	23 (74)
Average precipitation mm (inches)	154 (6.1)	101 (4.0)	78 (3.1)	59 (2.3)	95 (3.7)	130 (5.1)	131 (5.2)	137 (5.4)	125 (4.9)	145 (5.7)	141 (5.6)	121 (4.8)	1,417 (55.9)
Average rainy days	17.4	13.9	14.4	14.3	22.3	26.0	27.9	27.5	26.2	26.4	21.4	17.2	254.9
Source: Meteoblue (modeled/calculated data, not measured locally)

=== Barangays ===
Sibagat is politically subdivided into 24 barangays. Each barangay consists of puroks while some have sitios.

PSGC	Barangay	Population			±% p.a.	
		2024		2010		
160314001	Afga	9.0%	2,995	3,151	▾	−0.35%
160314002	Anahawan	1.8%	597	639	▾	−0.47%
160314003	Banagbanag	2.0%	677	719	▾	−0.42%
160314004	Del Rosario	0.8%	262	284	▾	−0.56%
160314005	El Rio	4.4%	1,463	1,443	▴	0.10%
160314006	Ilihan	3.2%	1,057	1,087	▾	−0.19%
160314007	Kauswagan	1.0%	338	378	▾	−0.77%
160314008	Kioya	1.9%	635	651	▾	−0.17%
160314024	Kolambugan	5.9%	1,974	1,981	▾	−0.02%
160314009	Magkalape	0.5%	178	264	▾	−2.70%
160314010	Magsaysay	2.9%	968	934	▴	0.25%
160314011	Mahayahay	3.5%	1,172	1,429	▾	−1.37%
160314012	New Tubigon	3.3%	1,113	1,099	▴	0.09%
160314013	Padiay	4.9%	1,627	1,573	▴	0.23%
160314014	Perez	2.8%	923	1,055	▾	−0.92%
160314015	Poblacion	18.0%	5,998	5,875	▴	0.14%
160314016	San Isidro	2.6%	850	955	▾	−0.81%
160314017	San Vicente	3.8%	1,278	1,087	▴	1.13%
160314018	Santa Cruz	1.3%	444	492	▾	−0.71%
160314019	Santa Maria	2.2%	720	704	▴	0.16%
160314020	Sinai	1.7%	551	621	▾	−0.83%
160314021	Tabon-tabon	9.2%	3,053	2,943	▴	0.26%
160314022	Tag-uyango	2.0%	678	644	▴	0.36%
160314023	Villangit	3.6%	1,189	977	▴	1.37%
	Total		33,271	30,985	▴	0.50%

== Demographics ==
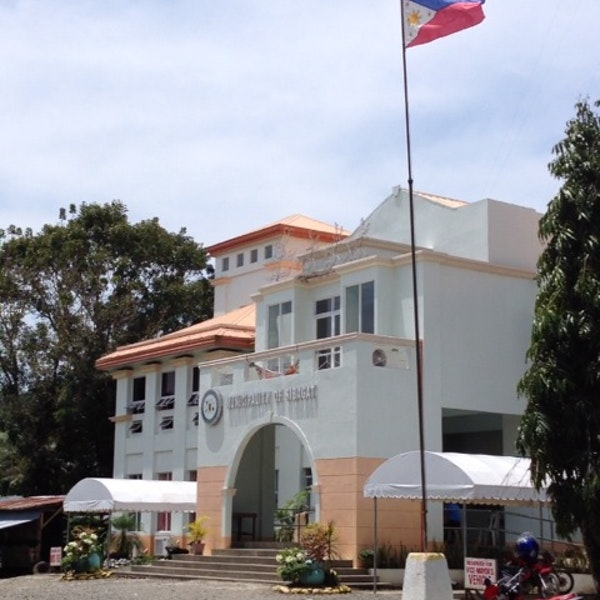
Sibagat Town Hall

Population census of Sibagat
Year	Pop.	±% p.a.
1990	24,004	—
1995	28,185	+3.05%
2000	28,685	+0.38%
2007	30,074	+0.65%
2010	30,985	+1.09%
2015	30,442	−0.34%
2020	33,957	+2.33%
2024	33,271	−0.49%
Source: Philippine Statistics Authority

In the 2020 census, Sibagat had a population of 33,957. The population density was 60 inhabitants per square kilometre (160/sq mi).

Most of the inhabitants are Visayan migrants from Bohol, Cebu, Leyte and Negros provinces. Indigenous people include the Manobo and Higaonon.

== Economy ==
Poverty incidence of Sibagat (%)

Source: Philippine Statistics Authority

=== Agriculture ===
The economy of Sibagat is dependent heavily on subsistence agriculture. Its major agricultural products are coconut, corn, coffee, cacao, fruits, vegetables, and root crops.

=== Trade and Industry ===
The town of Sibagat plays a major role in Abacá Industry in Agusan del Sur as well as the entire Caraga Region.

The Sibagat Federation of Abaca Weavers Association (SAWA), Inc. — as Sibagat town is leading and major producer of "sinamay" (woven abaca fiber) that played vital role in the growing and production of abaca products in the province. Abaca is identified as "One Town One Product" (OTOP). Their major product is Sinamay, a woven stalks of the abaca tree which fiber is stronger than cotton or silk, and as a result of that sinamay holds a very firm shape. Sibagat "sinamay" shines every time they will participate in trade fairs in both regional and national events. Members of Sibagat Abaca Weavers Association (SAWA) make rolls of fabric from sinamay or the first-class fiber from the Tagongon and Laylay varieties of abaca. The woven fabric is used as material for handicraft, housewares and fashion accessories, which are sold in the home and export markets.

The Kolambugan Tribal Tree Farmers Association (KATTFA) is a major player of abaca trading. A licensed abaca local trader based in Kolambugan, Sibagat, Agusan del Sur authorized by the Philippine Fiber Industry Development Authority (PFIDA).

=== Energy ===
Global Sibagat Hydro Power Corporation is a subsidiary of Jowood Industries Inc., Philippines. The company has initially awarded by the Department of Energy (DOE) a Renewable Energy (RE) Service contracts for multiple hydropower projects in the Municipality of Sibagat with a combined potential capacity of 24-Megawatts (MW). The said contracts were executed through a ceremonial signing with Global Sibagat President James G. Ong and the then Energy Secretary Jericho Petilla last February 6, 2014. The RE projects are the Managong Hydroelectric Power Plant (6MW), Wawa Hydro Power Plant (13MW) and Bugsukan Hydro Power Plant (5MW) all located in Sibagat, Agusan del Sur.

==== Hydro Power Plant Projects ====
The Department of Energy (DOE) have identified various Renewable Energy power plant projects and awarded service contracts to the below list of hydropower projects all located in the Municipality of Sibagat.

- 13MW Wawa Hydropower Plant Project -
- 6MW Managong Hydroelectric Power Plant Project - Location: Managong Falls, Barangay Padiay
- 5MW Bugsukan Hydropower Plant Project - Location: Bugsukan River, Barangay Tabontabon,
- 5MW Hilong-hilong 4 Hydropower Plant Project - Location: Barangay Kolambugan
- 7.7MW Wawa 1 Hydropower Project - Location: Wawa River, Barangay Kolambugan and Padiay
- 7.0MW Wawa 2 Hydropower Project - Location: Wawa River, Barangay Kolambugan and Padiay
- 5.6MW Wawa 3 Hydropower Project - Location: Managong River, Barangay Padiay

== Government ==
=== Elected officials ===
Members of the Sibagat Municipal council (2022-2025):

Executive officials:

- Municipal Mayor: Dr. Thelma Gonzaga Lamanilao, MD
- Municipal Vice Mayor: Maria Liza Lamanilao Evangelista, CPA, REB, ENP

Municipal councilors:

- Aljun Pagyos Cayawan
- Josephine Dacera Benegian
- Jovan Aplicador Duarte
- Salvador Palban Bares, Jr.
- Roland Canono Vergara
- Mark Vincent Borres Muldez
- Gines Gablines Coranes
- Francisco Pagoyo Garlit

== Infrastructure ==
=== Communications ===
The Philippine Long Distance Telephone Company provides fixed line services. Wireless mobile communications services are provided by Smart Communications and Globe Telecommunications.

=== Transportation ===
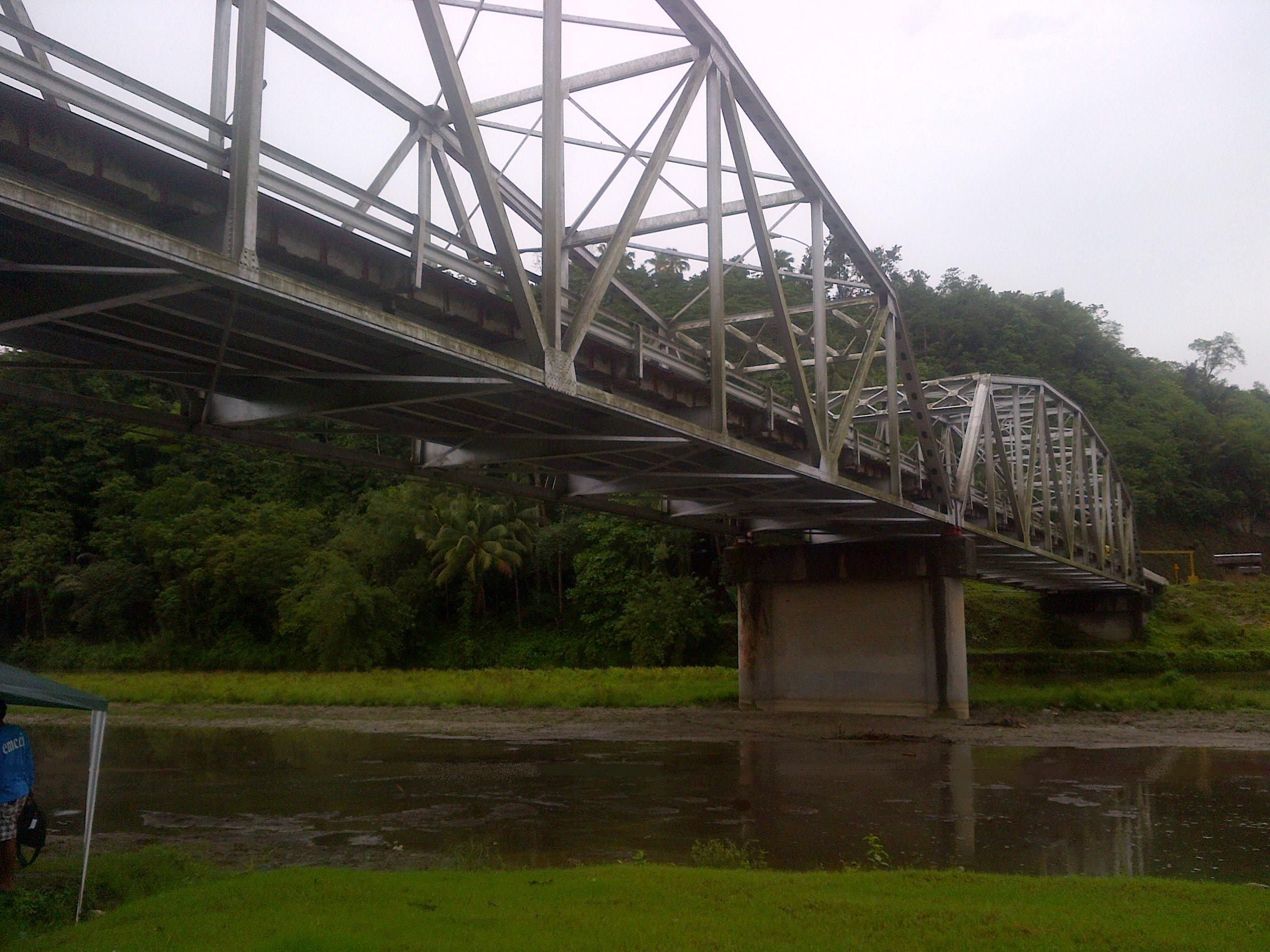
The Wawa Bridge

==== By Land ====
All means of land transportation including Public Utility Buses (PUB), most common are "Bachelor Express" and ''Davao Metro Shuttle" including "Surigao Express" and "Land Car Inc (LCI)" plying the routes of Butuan-Davao, Butuan-San Luis, Butuan-San Francisco, Butuan-Mangagoy and Butuan-Tandag via Pan-Philippine Highway Butuan-Agusan-Davao Road. There are also Public Utility Jeepneys (PUJ) and Passenger Vans plying Butuan-Sibagat-Bayugan route.

Sibagat can be reached also by land directly from Manila, Cubao, Pasay, Bicol and Visayas plying to Davao City routes and vice versa through Philtranco and PP Bus Line via Pan-Philippine Highway.

==== By Air ====
Butuan Airport (also referred as Bancasi Airport) is the nearest airport.

Davao Airport (also referred as Francisco Bangoy International Airport) can be an alternate route from Manila or Cebu City to Davao City as transit point.

Surigao Airport can also be an alternate route from Cebu to Surigao City as transit point.

==== By Sea ====
Inter-island vessels with the likes of M/V Filipinas vessels of Cokaliong Shipping Lines, Trans-Asia Shipping Lines and 2GO Travel of 2GO Group (the latest operator of the remnants of formerly famous SuperFerry fleet, Negros Navigation fleet and Cebu Ferries) plying the Manila-Cebu-Nasipit, Manila-Surigao-Nasipit, Manila-Cagayan de Oro-Nasipit, Cebu-Nasipit, Tagbilaran-Nasipit and Dumaguete-Nasipit routes on regular schedules with Nasipit Port as transit point. Public Utility Buses, Public Utility Jeepneys, Passenger Vans and Multicabs are available at Nasipit Port Wharf going to Butuan Integrated Bus Terminal.

==== Local transportation ====
Motorcycle taxi, locally known as Habal-habal, is a single motorcycle modified with outriggers to seat more than two persons that caters passengers from Sibagat town proper to adjacent barangays and remote villages with rough and steep terrain. In Sibagat town, the more complex Habal-habal can seat up to twelve persons or more including their baggage.

== Media ==
DXCN-FM 99.1 Radyo Kaagapay - the only broadcast radio station in the town of Sibagat. The Nutriskwela Community Radio is a Project of the National Nutrition Council (Philippines) to address the problem of hunger and malnutrition in the Philippines by providing correct and updated Nutrition and Health information to areas with high prevalence of malnutrition and no access to broadcast media. It was implemented in 2008, and Radyo Kaagapay in Sibagat, Agusan del Sur was its pioneering recipient in Caraga.

== Education ==
=== Central elementary schools ===
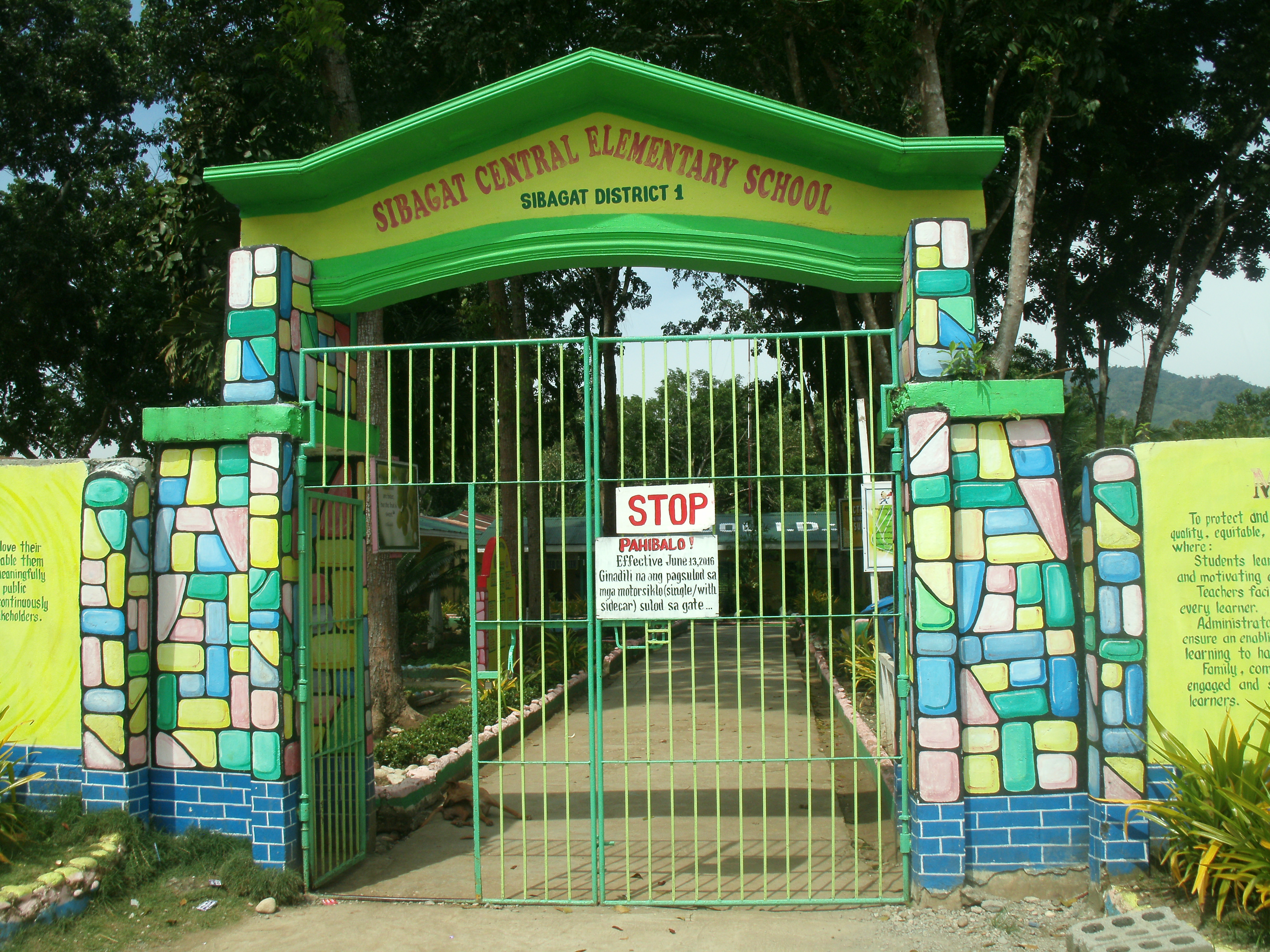
Sibagat Central Elementary School

Name	District	Barangay
Sibagat Central Elementary School	Sibagat District I	Poblacion
Afga Central Elementary School	Sibagat District II	Afga

=== Secondary schools ===
There are Six (6) high schools in the town.

Name	Type	Barangay
Afga National High School (ANHS)	Public	Afga
Father Saturnino Urios College of Sibagat, Inc. (FSUCSI)	Private	Poblacion
Magsaysay National High School (MNHS)	Public	Magsaysay
New Tubigon National High School of Home Industries (NTNHSHI)	Public	New Tubigon
Padiay National High School (PNHS)	Public	Padiay
Sibagat National High School of Home Industries (SNHSHI)	Public	Poblacion

=== College ===
Name	Type	Barangay
Father Saturnino Urios College of Sibagat, Inc. (FSUCSI)	Private	Poblacion

Father Saturnino Urios College of Sibagat, Inc. (FSUCSI), is the oldest private educational institution in Sibagat. Founded in 1968 by Rev. Fr. Atanacio B. De Castro, S.J. the school named after the Spanish Jesuit Missionary Father Saturnino Urios, S.J. It is a Catholic Private School that run by the Diocese of Butuan located at the heart of Sibagat within the compound of Saint Anthony of Padua Parish along the Daang Maharlika Pan-Philippine Highway in Barangay Poblacion. The institution is also a sister school of Father Saturnino Urios University in Butuan. It offers complete Kindergarten, Elementary, Secondary Education and Senior high school. It is also an accredited Technical Education and Skills Development Authority (TESDA) Training Center for their TVET courses.

=== Other Schools ===
Name	Type	Barangay	District
Afga Central Elementary School	Public	Afga	District II
Anahawan Elementary School	Public	Anahawan	District II
Bagumbayan IP School	Public	Santa Cruz	District II
Balonbon Elementary School	Public	Padiay (Km. 29)	District II
Banagbanag Elementary School	Public	Banagbanag	District II
Bantolinao Elementary School	Public	Padiay (Purok 8)	District II
Bayabas Elementary School	Public	Padiay (Sitio Bayabas)	District II
Causwagan Elementary School	Public	Kauswagan	District I
Dandanon Elementary School	Public	Kolambugan	District II
Del Rosario Elementary School	Public	Del Rosario	District II
El Rio Elementary School	Public	El Rio	District II
Father Saturnino Urios College of Sibagat, Inc. (Kinder and Elementary)	Private	Poblacion	District I
Goshen Primary School	Public	New Tubigon (Goshen)	District I
Ilihan Elementary School	Public	Ilihan	District I
Kioya Elementary School	Public	Kioya	District I
Kolambugan Elementary School	Public	Kolambugan	District II
Magkalape Elementary School	Public	Magkalape	District II
Magsaysay Elementary School	Public	Magsaysay	District I
Mahayahay Elementary School	Public	Mahayahay	District I
New Tubigon Elementary School	Public	New Tubigon	District I
Padiay Elementary School	Public	Padiay	District II
Pañas Elementary School	Public	Padiay (Sitio Pañas)	District II
Perez Elementary School	Public	Perez	District II
San Isidro I Elementary School	Public	San Isidro	District I
San Isidro II Elementary School	Public	Afga	District II
San Roque Elementary School	Public	Magsaysay	District I
San Vicente Elementary School	Public	San Vicente	District I
Sinai Elementary School	Public	Sinai	District I
Sibagat Central Elementary School (SCES)	Public	Poblacion	District I
Santa Cruz Elementary School	Public	Santa Cruz	District II
Santa Maria Elementary School	Public	Santa Maria	District II
Tabontabon Elementary School	Public	Tabontabon	District II
Tag-oyango Elementary School	Public	Tag-uyango	District I
Villangit Elementary School	Public	Villangit	District I

=== Other Educational and Learning Institutions ===
Name	Type	Barangay
Sibagat LGU Demonstration Farm (Agricultural Training Institute-RTC 13 Demo Farm)	Learning Site	Poblacion
Alternative Learning Center for Agricultural and Livelihood Development, Inc. (ALCADEV)	Learning Center	Padiay
Bible Baptist Church Children's Learning Center of Sibagat, Inc.	Learning Center	Sibagat
Light and Life Learning Center of Sibagat, Inc.	Learning Center	Poblacion
Saint Anthony of Padua Learning Center - Sibagat, Inc.	Learning Center	Poblacion
Sidlak Child Development Center	Learning Center	Poblacion (Purok 1)
Negosyo Center (NC) Sibagat	Learning Center	Poblacion
HOPE Center Sibagat	Learning Center	Poblacion
Justice, Peace and Integrity of Creation-Integrated Development Center (JPIC-IDC)	Learning Center	Tag-uyango
Poder y Prosperidad dela Comunidad (PODER) Day Care Center	Learning Center	Poblacion
Poblacion Sibagat Day Care Center	Learning Center	Poblacion
Barangay Day Care Centers	Learning Center	All Sibagat Barangays
The Sibagat SKA Federation General Merchandise	Marketing Center	Poblacion

== Notable personalities ==
- Dennis Laurente — (Barangay Mahayahay), a Filipino Professional Boxer and a former holder of World Boxing Council Asian Boxing Council (WBC ABC) Super Welterweight Champion belt. Born in Palompon, Leyte but raised in Barangay Mahayahay, Sibagat. He attended his early education at Mahayahay Elementary School and secondary at Sibagat National High School of Home Industries.
