= Lot Dean Lockwood =

American lawyer

Lot Dean Lockwood (L. D. Lockwood, February 20, 1879 – September 26, 1960) was an American businessman, attorney-at-law, educator, Philippine Government Official and Republican Delegate for the Philippines. Born in Brownsville, California, L. D. Lockwood studied at local California schools ultimately studying law at Stanford University. He was a member of the Bar associations of the Philippines and California, as well as a member of the Bar of the Supreme Court of the United States. In 1903 he was commission by the United States Federal Civil Service to serve as an educator in the Philippines. While in the Philippines, he became a supervisor for the public school system and held several governmental positions including treasurer and district auditor of several provinces. In 1926 he developed a well-known law practice in the Philippines becoming widely known as Judge Lockwood and as prominent member of the American Chamber of Commerce of the Philippines. He started and lead several businesses including the Pampanga Bus Company, Inc, the Northern Luzon Transportation Company, Inc., and the Motor Service Company, Inc. Lot Dean Lockwood represented the Philippines as a delegate to the Republican National Convention in Kansas City in 1928 (Convention Vice President) and again in Philadelphia in 1940. Lockwood worked with US Government officials to help the Philippines develop legal and financial independence which involved him working personally with Dwight D. Eisenhower. Lockwood chronicled the history of law in the Philippines during and after World War II Japanese occupation of the Philippines in a 1950 Stanford Law Review article entitled "The Philippine Supreme Court and Postwar Problems of International Law"

Lockwood nearly died in the Agusan River while traveling between provinces as district auditor. Lockwood was married to Goldie Elizabeth Donham, who died not long after childbirth in Manila due to preeclampsia. His only daughter, Martha Elizabeth Lockwood-Laederich, survived. Lockwood remarried the socialite Bertha Gardner of San Francisco.
