= Managong Falls =

- Location: Sibagat, Agusan del Sur, Mindanao, Philippines
- Type: Fan
- Total height: 80 m (262.5 ft)
- Number of drops: 2
- Average width: 20 m (66 ft)

Managong Falls is known to be the biggest and tallest waterfalls in the province of Agusan del Sur. Located in barangay Padiay in the municipality of Sibagat, Agusan del Sur, Caraga Region, in the southern Philippine island of Mindanao, is one of the tourist attractions and ecotourism sites of Sibagat.

== Etymology ==
Managong from the word "manago" or "tago" is a Visayan term meaning hide or hidden. The name of the waterfalls roughly translates to "Hidden Falls" which implies it is a "hidden paradise". Topographically, the waterfalls is hidden in the middle of the forest and believed to be the tallest and strongest running waterfalls in Caraga Region.

== Geography ==
Managong Waterfalls is located in the hinterlands of Barangay Padiay, Sibagat, Agusan del Sur. Its outfalls stream towards Managong River, a tributary river of the larger Wawa River.

The waterfalls and its vicinity host a wide variety of flora and fauna, and a deep bluish water in where tourist could conduct ecotourism related activities such as swimming, hiking, trekking, mountaineering, kayaking and other wide adventures. It now has an established hiking trail and a frequent site for photoshoots.

== Source of Power ==
Managong Falls is the proposed site of the Managong Hydroelectric Power Plant. The falls is believed to be one of the biggest sources of renewable energy in the province of Agusan del Sur, owing to its strong current. The output of the hydroelectrical plant is projected to be able to cover the electricity demand for the entire Caraga Region.
