= Agusan Dam =

Dam in Bukidnon, Philippines

Agusan Hydroelectric Plant
- Location in Mindanao Location in the Philippines
- Coordinates: 8°21′00″N 124°46′00″E
- Construction began: May 1956
- Opening date: December 29, 1957
- Construction cost: $ 20.74 Million or 891.82 Million pesos (at current price)
- Owner: First Gen

Dam and spillways
- Type of dam: Concrete Flow
- Impounds: Agusan River
- Height: 1 m (3 ft 3 in)
- Length: 22 m (72 ft)
- Spillway type: Trapezoid, Overflow Type

Reservoir
- Total capacity: 2,996 million cubic meters
- Surface area: 117 km^{2}
- Maximum water depth: 193 meters

Power Station
- Turbines: 2 units Horizontal Shaft, Waterwheel
- Installed capacity: 1.6 MW
- Annual generation: 10,500,000 kWh

The Agusan Hydroelectric Plant, the downstream facility of two proposed plants, was constructed in Damilag, Manolo Fortich, Bukidnon to serve the immediate domestic and industrial requirements of the area. The watershed is small, and covers an area of around 25 km^{2} at the diversion dam. The run-of-river plant consists of two 800-kW turbine generators that use smoke from the Agusan River to generate electricity. It is connected to the local distribution grid Cepalco through the Transco distribution line.

== See also ==
- Water supply and sanitation in the Philippines
- Energy in the Philippines
