= Dennis Laurente =

Filipino boxer

Personal information
- Nationality: Filipino
- Born: 29 July 1977 (age 49) Palompon, Leyte, Philippines
- Height: 5 ft 8 in (1.73 m)
- Weight: Welterweight

Boxing career
- Stance: Southpaw

Boxing record
- Total fights: 64
- Wins: 50
- Win by KO: 30
- Losses: 9
- Draws: 5

Dennis Laurente (born July 29, 1977) is a Filipino professional boxer.

During his younger days, his family migrated to Agusan del Sur. He continued his studies in Sibagat, Agusan del Sur and later in 1997, they migrated again in Agusan del Norte where he had a stint of work in a factory line making durian candy in Butuan. Later, Laurente joined his parents in Leyte and did some work in the farm until he went to Manila to live with his uncle. A friend and pro boxer Aljun Corporal brought Laurente to Elorde in 1998.

He fights under the care of Johnny S. Elorde, President of the Johnny Elorde Management International, and his wife, Liza Elorde, a boxing care manager.

== Professional career ==
Laurente started as a professional boxer on April 23, 1994, against Alberto Sososco. He won the bout via technical knockout in round 4.

He won his first title, the Philippines Games & Amusement Board (GAB) lightweight championship, on August 9, 2000, against veteran fighter Francis Velasquez. The bout was held in Manila and ended by unanimous decision, all in favor of Laurente. On May 4, 2001, he took on Thai boxer Prawet Singwancha but suffered his first ever loss by unanimous decision. The fight was for the PABA lightweight title. Despite the loss, Laurente won the vacant OPBF lightweight title against Yosuke Otsuka in his next bout on November 23, 2001. He defended the title a total of 7 times, but fell short to Chicashi Inada on March 5, 2005. After 3 more fights, Laurente moved to the light welterweight division.

== Professional record ==
49 Wins (30 knockouts), 7 defeats, 5 Draw
No.	Res.	Record	Opponent	Type	Round Time	Date	Location	Notes
61	loss	49-7-5	(Japan) Takayuki Hosokawa	SD	12 (12)	2015-11-22	Sumiyoshi SportsCenter, Osaka, Japan	Lost OPBF Super Welterweight championship
60	loss	49-6-5	(United States) John Jackson	UD	12 (12)	2015-08-02	(United States) Full Sail University, Winter Park, Florida, U.S.	
59	Win	49-5-5	(Japan) Tadashi Yuba	TKO	6 (12), 2:38	2014-12-18	Korakuen Hall, Tokyo, Japan	Won vacant OPBF Super Welterweight championship
58	Win	48-5-5	(Philippines) Ely Pangaribuan	TKO	2 (12), 2:59	2014-08-22	The Flash Grand Ballroom, Elorde Sports Complex, Paranaque City, Philippines	Retains WBC Asian Boxing Council Super Welterweight title
57	Win	47-5-5	(Thailand) Singdet Nonpitayakom	KO	5 (12), 2:57	2014-02-01	The Flash Grand Ballroom, Elorde Sports Complex, Paranaque City, Philippines	Retains WBC Asian Boxing Council Super Welterweight title
56	Win	46-5-5	(Thailand) Khomkaew Sithsaithong	KO	1(10), 0:39	2013-12-14	The Flash Grand Ballroom, Elorde Sports Complex, Paranaque City, Philippines	
55	Win	45-5-5	(Thailand) Manopoi Singmanasak	TKO	2(12), 2:33	2013-08-10	Midas Hotel and Casino, Pasay, Philippines	Won vacant WBC Asian Boxing Council Super Welterweight title
54	Win	44-5-5	(Philippines) Dondon Lapuz	TKO	1 (12), 1:35	2013-02-24	The Flash Grand Ballroom, Elorde Sports Complex, Paranaque City, Philippines	Retains Philippines Games and Amusement Board (GAB) Welterweight title
53	loss	43-5-5	(United States) Kenny Abril	SD	12 (12)	2012-12-07	(United States) Texas Station Casino, Las Vegas, Nevada, U.S.	
52	Win	43-4-5	(Philippines) Jamed Jalarante	KO	1 (10), 0:37	2012-09-29	The Flash Grand Ballroom, Elorde Sports Complex, Paranaque City, Philippines	
51	Win	42-4-5	(Philippines) Eusebio Baluarte	TKO	12 (12), 3:00	2012-03-25	Dusit Thani hotel, Makati City, Philippines	Retains [Philippines Games and Amusement Board (GAB) Welterweight title
50	win	41-5-5	(Ghana) Ayi Bruce	TKO	7 (8), 0:57	2011-11-11	(United States) MGM Grand, Las Vegas, Nevada, U.S.	
49	Win	40-4-5	(Philippines) Cris Alag	TKO	1 (12), 0:31	2011-08-11	Sofitel Plaza Hotel, Pasay, Philippines	Retains [Philippines Games and Amusement Board (GAB) Welterweight title
48	Win	39-4-5	(Philippines) Dondon Sultan	TKO	6 (12), 0:30	2011-03-05	Metro Naga Coliseum, Naga City, Philippines	Won [Philippines Games and Amusement Board (GAB) Welterweight title
47	win	38-4-5	(United States) Rashad Holloway	UD	8 (8)	2010-11-13	(United States) Cowboys Stadium, Arlington, Texas, U.S.	
46	Win	37-4-5	(Thailand) Kompayak Sithsaithong	TKO	1(10), 2:41	2010-10-02	The Flash Grand Ballroom, Elorde Sports Complex, Paranaque City, Philippines	
45	win	36-4-5	(Ghana) Ben Tackie	UD	8 (8)	2010-03-12	(United States) Gaylord Hotel, Grapevine, Texas, U.S.	
44	Win	35-4-5	(Thailand) Laimankon Chuwatana	TKO	2(10), 1:14	2010-01-23	Cuneta Astrodome, Pasay, Philippines	
43	win	34-4-5	(Mexico) Zaid Zavaleta	UD	10 (10)	2009-08-29	(United States) Blaisdell Center, Honolulu, Hawaii, U.S.	
42	win	33-4-5	(United States) Marvin Cordova, Jr.	UD	10 (10)	2009-05-01	(United States) Hard Rock Hotel and Casino, Las Vegas, Nevada, U.S.	
41	win	32-4-5	(Mexico) Arturo Urena	RTD	86(8), 3:00	2008-09-25	(United States) Sycuan Resort and Casino, El Cajon, California, U.S.	
40	win	31-4-5	(United States) Steve Quinonez	RTD	4 (8), 3:00	2008-06-28	(United States) Mandalay Bay Hotel and Casino, Las Vegas, Nevada, U.S.	
39	Win	30-4-5	(Thailand) Kongtoranee Por Surasak	TKO	1(10), 1:12	2008-03-25	Centennial Hall, Manila Hotel, Manila, Philippines	Super Lightweight Contest
38	Win	29-4-5	(Philippines) Moses Seran	KO	7(12), 2:34	2007-11-09	Le Pavilion, Pasay, Philippines	Retains PABA Lightweight Contest
37	Win	28-4-5	(Japan) Shinya Nagase	UD	10(10)	2007-09-02	Korakuen Hall, Tokyo, Japan	
36	Win	27-4-5	(Indonesia) Hero Yauw Katili	TKO	12(12), 2:02	2007-03-23	The Flash Grand Ballroom, Elorde Sports Complex, Paranaque City, Philippines	Retains PABA Lightweight Contest
35	Win	26-4-5	(Thailand) Somchai Nakbalee	SD	12(12)	2006-10-31	(Philippines) Chaiyaphum, Thailand	Won PABA Lightweight Contest
34	Win	25-4-5	(Russia) Rustam Nugaev	UD	8(8)	2006-07-02	Araneta Coliseum, Cubao, Quezon City, Philippines	
33	Loss	24-4-5	(Indonesia) Daudy Bahari	TD	12(12)	2006-04-06	Indosair Studio, Jakarta, Indonesia	Vacant PABA super lightweight title
32	win	24-3-5	(Japan) Yuri Yoshikawa	MD	10(10)	2005-08-02	Korakuen Hall, Tokyo, Japan	
31	win	23-3-5	(Indonesia) Stack Poncogati	TKO	1(10)	2005-06-07	RCTI Studio, Jakarta, Indonesia	
30	draw	22-3-5	(Philippines) Arnel Porras	D	6(6)	2005-05-06	NBC Tent, The Fort, Fort Bonifacio, Taguig, Philippines	
29	loss	22-3-4	(Japan) Chikashi Inada	SD	12(12)	2005-03-05	Korakuen Hall, Tokyo, Japan	lost OPBF lightweight title
28	win	22-2-3	(Japan) Chikashi Inada	MD	12(12)	2004-10-02	Korakuen Hall, Tokyo, Japan	retains OPBF lightweight title
27	draw	21-2-4	(Japan) Kengo Nagashima	D	10(10)	2004-02-07	Korakuen Hall, Tokyo, Japan	
26	draw	21-2-3	(Philippines) Fernando Montilla	D	12(12)	2003-08-20	PAGCOR Grand Theater, Airport Casino Filipino, Parañaque City, Philippines	retains OPBF lightweight title
25	win	21-2-2	(Indonesia) Hengky Tobias	UD	10(10)	2003-03-25	Surabaya, Indonesia	
24	win	20-2-2	(Indonesia) Joey de Ricardo	UD	10(10)	2003-02-04	Jakarta, Indonesia	
23	win	19-2-2	(Indonesia) Andreas Seran	KO	6(10)	2002-10-08	Jakarta, Indonesia	
22	win	18-2-2	(Philippines) Fernando Montilla	UD	12(12)	2002-06-15	PAGCOR Grand Theater, Airport Casino Filipino, Parañaque City, Philippines	retains OPBF lightweight title
21	win	17-2-2	(Philippines) Ulyses Puzon	UD	10(10)	2002-02-24	The Flash Grand Ballroom, Elorde Sports Complex, Paranaque City, Philippines	
20	win	16-2-2	Japan	UD	12(12)	2001-11-23	International Conference Hall, Nagoya, Japan	won OPBF lightweight title
19	loss	15-2-2	(Thailand) Prawet Singwancha	UD	12(12)	2001-05-04	Bangkok, Thailand	PABA Lightweight title
18	loss	15-1-2	(Indonesia) Ferdinand Andriano	UD	10(10)	2001-02-23	Jakarta, Indonesia	
17	win	15-0-2	(Philippines) Tirso Albia	UD	10(10)	2001-01-26	Cebu City Waterfront Hotel & Casino, Barangay Lahug, Cebu City, Philippines	
16	draw	14-0-2	(Philippines) Nonoy Gonzales	D	12(12)	2000-12-16	Mabini Gymnasium, Mabini, Philippines	Retains Philippines Games & Amusement Board (GAB) lightweight title
15	win	14-0-1	(Philippines) Francis Velasquez	UD	12(12)	2000-08-09	The Flash Grand Ballroom, Elorde Sports Complex, Paranaque City, Philippines	Won Philippines Games & Amusement Board (GAB) lightweight title
14	win	13-0-1	(Philippines) Ariel Neri	UD	10(10)	2000-0-17	Paranaque City, Philippines	
13	win	12-0-1	(Philippines) Ian Fajardo	TKO	4(10), 2:42	2000-01-29	Paranaque City, Philippines	
12	win	11-0-1	(Philippines) Noli Fabroa	TKO	3(10), 2:39	1999-10-30	The Flash Grand Ballroom, Elorde Sports Complex, Paranaque City, Philippines	
11	win	10-0-1	(Philippines) Al Jongjong Abao	TKO	4(10), 3:00	1999-08-28	Paranaque City, Philippines	
10	win	9-0-1	(Philippines) Bert Andales	TKO	1(10), 1:55	1999-07-17	Paranaque City, Philippines	
9	win	8-0-1	(Philippines) James Andiso	TKO	7(8), 1:19	1999-05-15	San Jose, Philippines	
8	win	7-0-1	(Philippines) Ronnie dela Costa	TKO	7(8), 0:23	1999-03-18	The Flash Grand Ballroom, Elorde Sports Complex, Paranaque City, Philippines	
7	win	6-0-1	(Philippines) Francis Severino	TKO	1(6)	1998-12-19	The Flash Grand Ballroom, Elorde Sports Complex, Paranaque City, Philippines	
6	win	5-0-1	(Philippines) Gary Ordoñez	UD	6(6)	1998-10-28	The Flash Grand Ballroom, Elorde Sports Complex, Paranaque City, Philippines	
5	win	4-0-1	(Philippines) Harold Smith	TKO	1(4)	1998-07-30	The Flash Grand Ballroom, Elorde Sports Complex, Paranaque City, Philippines	
4	win	3-0-1	(Philippines) Vic Centeno	TKO	3(4)	1998-05-02	The Flash Grand Ballroom, Elorde Sports Complex, Paranaque City, Philippines	
3	win	2-0-1	(Philippines) Junie Gabon	SD	4(4)	1994-08-06	Butuan, Philippines	
2	draw	1-0-1	(Philippines) Digoy Esparago	SD	4(4)	1994-06-17	Socorro, Philippines	
1	win	1-0-0	(Philippines) Alberto Sososco	TKO	4(4)	1994-04-23	Butuan, Philippines	
TKO - Technical Knockout, KO - Knockout, TD - Technical Decision, RTD - Referee Technical Decision, SD - Split Decision, UD - Unanimous Decision, D - Draw
