= Pinandagatan Falls =

Waterfall in Agusan del Sur, Philippines

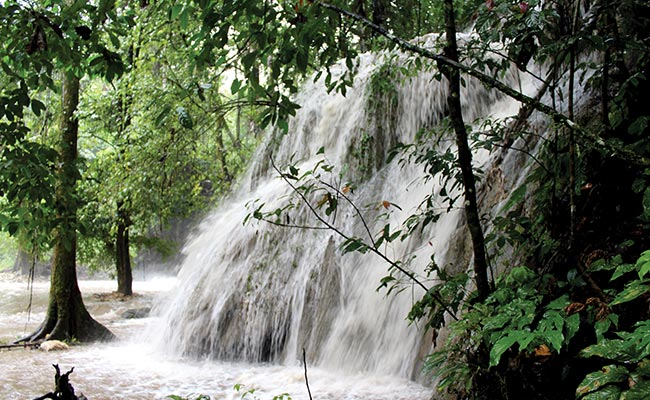
- Pinandagatan Falls in Sibagat, Agusan del Sur, Philippines
- Interactive map of Pinandagatan Falls
- Location: Sibagat, Agusan del Sur, Mindanao, Philippines
- Coordinates: 8°52′25″N 125°49′02″E
- Type: Fan
- Total height: 16.8 m (55.1 ft)
- Number of drops: 2
- Average width: 80 feet (24 m)

Pinandagatan Falls is located in the far-flung barangay of New Tubigon, Sibagat, Agusan del Sur in the southern Philippine island of Mindanao. It is one of the tourist attractions of Sibagat, Agusan del Sur.

== Etymology ==
Pinandagatan from the word "dagatan" is a Visayan language term meaning "lake", the falls is hidden in the middle of the forest and believed to be the longest running waterfalls in Caraga Region.

== Geography ==
Pinandagatan Falls is located in the hinterland forest in Barangay New Tubigon, Sibagat, Agusan del Sur.

The falls has many tiers to immerse deep into the forest. It is accessible via a 31-kilometer bumpy ride of muddy trek of uneven surface. It is now a popular hiking trail.

== See also ==
- List of waterfalls
- Sibagat, Agusan del Sur
- Agusan del Sur
- Caraga Region
