= Wawa River (Agusan del Sur) =

River in Agusan del Sur, Philippines

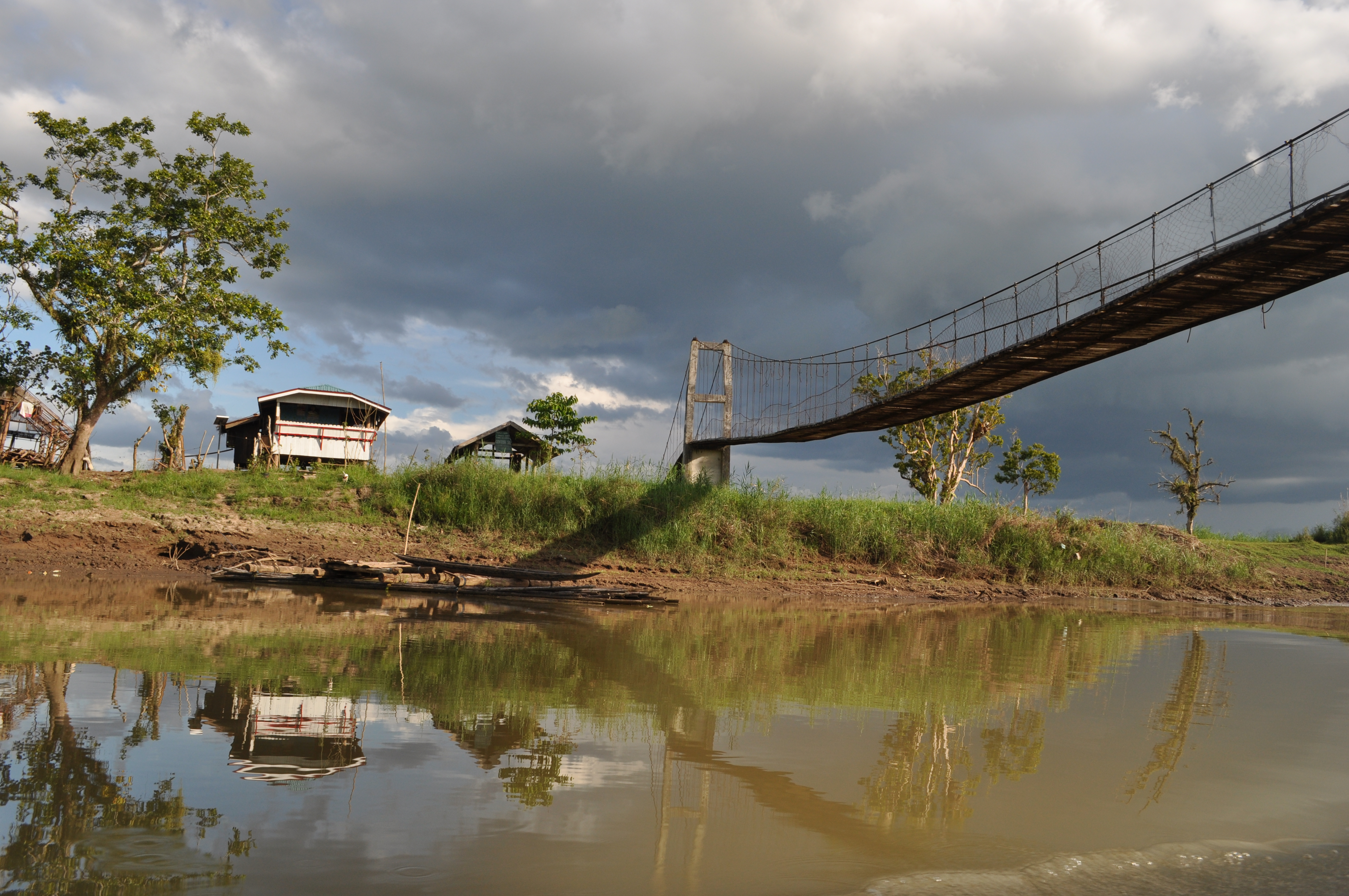
- Wawa River in Agusan del Sur

- Wawa River mouth Wawa River (Agusan del Sur) (Philippines)
- Native name: Ilog Wawa (Tagalog)

Location
- Country: Philippines
- Region: Caraga
- Province: Agusan del Sur
- City/Municipality: Sibagat, Bayugan, Esperanza

Physical characteristics
- Source
  - location: Sibagat, Agusan del Sur, Caraga Region
- Mouth: Wawa River
  - location: Poblacion, Esperanza, Agusan del Sur
  - coordinates: 8°40′23″N 125°38′44″E
- Length: 52 km (32 mi)
- Basin size: 24 km^{2} (9.3 sq mi)
- Discharge
  - location: Agusan River
  - average: 48 m^{3}/s (1,700 cu ft/s)

Basin features
- Progression: Wawa–Agusan

The Wawa River (Tagalog: Ilog Wawa; Cebuano: Suba sa Wawa) is a river located in Caraga, in northeastern Mindanao, the southern Philippine island. Its headwaters traverse the municipalities of Sibagat, Bayugan, and Esperanza (all within the province of Agusan del Sur). The Wawa River is a tributary of the larger Agusan River.

== Etymology ==
Wawa came from the Dumagat term that means an "entrance" or "passage." The river was once used by early settlers as a means of transportation during the early years.

== Geography ==
The river originates at the Diwata Mountain Range of the northeastern hinterlands of Sibagat in barangays Kolambugan and Padiay and streams traversing the riverbank barangays of Perez, Banagbanag, Santa Cruz, Magsaysay, San Isidro I, Villangit, Poblacion, Tag-uyango, San Vicente, Ilihan (all in the municipality of Sibagat), and barangays Del Carmen (formerly Wawa), Mabuhay, Canayugan, San Agustin, Sagmone, Noli, Maygatasan, Verdu, Salvacion (all in the City of Bayugan) and Mahagkot, Crossing Luna, Dakutan, Bentahon, Piglawigan (all in the municipality of Esperanza) wherein its mouth joins with the larger Agusan River located in Barangay Poblacion, Esperanza, Agusan del Sur.

== Crossings ==
There are three permanent bridges that cross the Wawa River:

- Wawa Bridge (1) – the longest steel bridge in the province located in Barangay San Vicente, Sibagat, Agusan del Sur along the Pan Philippine Highway Butuan-Davao Road, connecting the road linking the Municipality of Sibagat and City of Bayugan
- Wawa Bridge (2) – located in Barangay Padiay, Sibagat, along the Butuan-Tandag Road, connecting the road linking Brgy. Kolambugan and Brgy. Padiay in the town of Sibagat
- Esperanza Bridge – the longest duck girder bridge in the province located in Barangay Poblacion, Esperanza, Agusan del Sur connecting the road linking NRJ-Bayugan-Esperanza Road and Esperanza town proper

== Tributaries ==
- Managong River – Barangay Padiay, Sibagat, Agusan del Sur
- Palacio River – Barangay Perez, Sibagat, Agusan del Sur
- Balangubang River – Barangay Sta. Cruz, Sibagat, Agusan del Sur
- Boguko River – Barangay Magsaysay, Sibagat, Agusan del Sur
- Ponhikon River – Barangay Villangit, Sibagat, Agusan del Sur
- Sibagat River – Barangay Poblacion, Sibagat, Agusan del Sur
- Andanan River – Barangay Maygatasan, Bayugan

== Covered areas ==
- Sibagat, Agusan del Sur
- Bayugan, Agusan del Sur
- Esperanza, Agusan del Sur

== See also ==
- Agusan River
- Sibagat River
- Boguko River
- Andanan River
- Tambagoko River
- Sibagat, Agusan del Sur
- Bayugan, Agusan del Sur
- Esperanza, Agusan del Sur
- Agusan del Sur Province
- List of rivers of the Philippines
