= Esperanza, Agusan del Sur =

Municipality in Agusan del Sur, Philippines

Esperanza
- Municipality
- Municipality of Esperanza
- Municipal hall

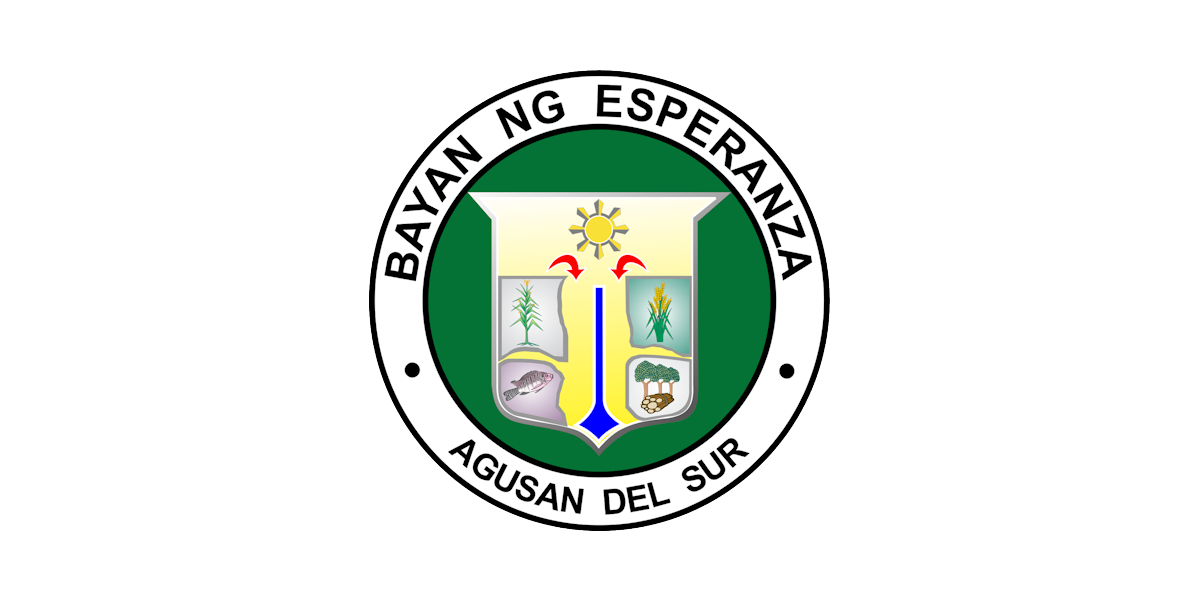
- Flag Seal

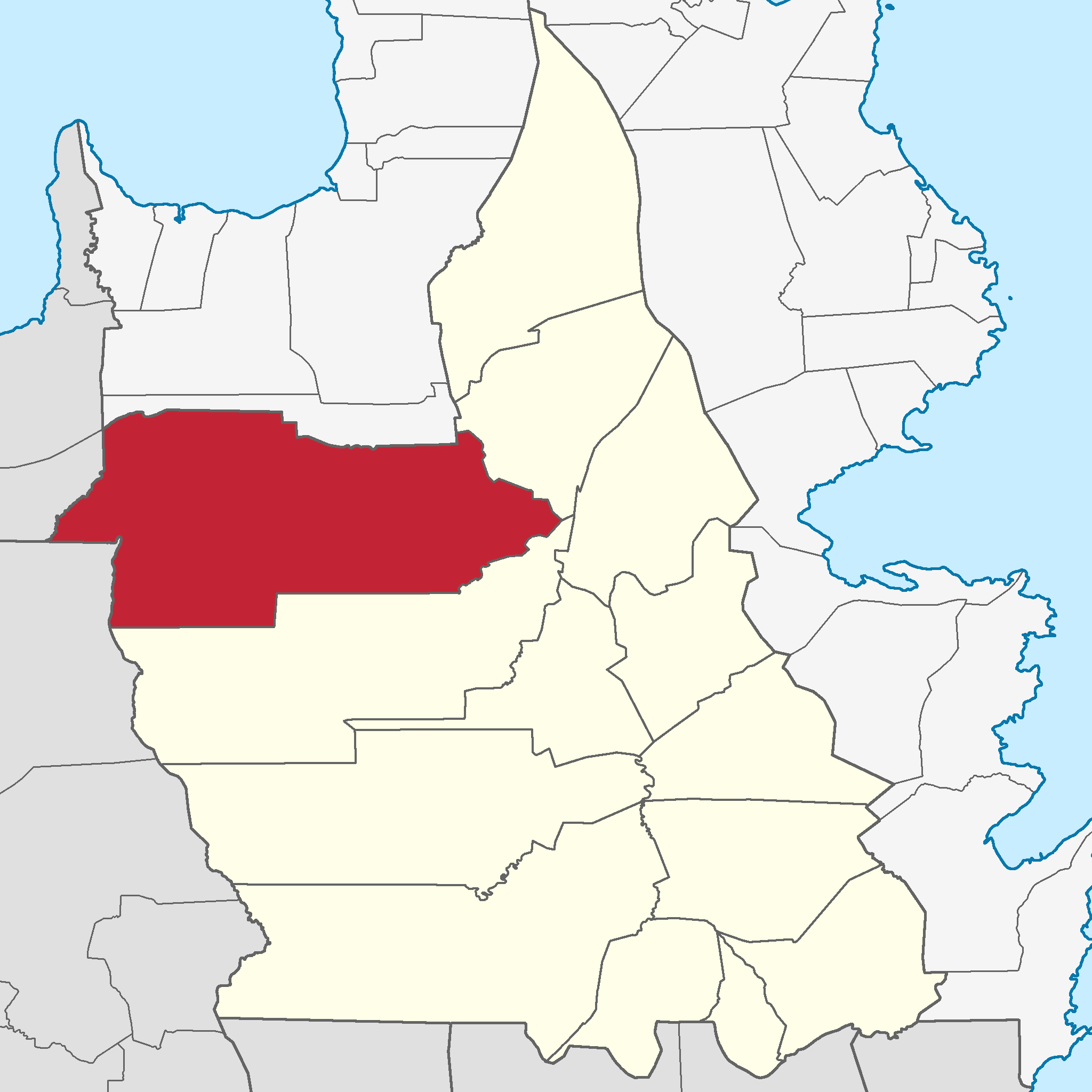
- Map of Agusan del Sur with Esperanza highlighted
- Interactive map of Esperanza
- Location within the Philippines
- Coordinates: 8°41′N 125°39′E
- Country: Philippines
- Region: Caraga
- Province: Agusan del Sur
- District: 1st district
- Founded: September 11, 1953
- Barangays: 47 (see Barangays)

Government
  - Type: Sangguniang Bayan
  - Mayor: Leonida P. Manpatilan
  - Vice Mayor: Eric Rey G. Siohan
  - Representative: Alfelito M. Bascug
  - Electorate: 33,849 voters (2025)

Area
  - Total: 1,355.48 km^{2} (523.35 sq mi)
- Elevation: 312 m (1,024 ft)
- Highest elevation: 1,991 m (6,532 ft)
- Lowest elevation: 0 m (0 ft)

Population (2024 census)
  - Total: 59,065
  - Density: 43.575/km^{2} (112.86/sq mi)
  - Households: 13,240

Economy
  - Income class: 1st municipal income class
  - Poverty incidence: 35.14% (2023)
  - Revenue: ₱ 550 million (2024)
  - Assets: ₱ 1,921 million (2024)
  - Expenditure: ₱ 410.8 million (2024)
  - Liabilities: ₱ 461 million (2024)

Service provider
  - Electricity: Agusan del Sur Electric Cooperative (ASELCO)
- Time zone: UTC+8 (PST)
- ZIP code: 8513
- PSGC: 1600303000
- IDD : area code: +63 (0)85
- Native languages: Agusan; Butuanon; Cebuano; Higaonon; Tagalog
- Website: www.esperanza.gov.ph

Esperanza, officially the Municipality of Esperanza (Cebuano: Lungsod sa Esperanza; Tagalog: Bayan ng Esperanza), is a municipality in the province of Agusan del Sur, Philippines. According to the 2024 census, it has a population of 59,065 people.

== History ==
The municipality of Esperanza was founded on September 11, 1953, per Executive Order No. 611 signed by President Elpidio Quirino. It began its functions as an independent municipality on September 27, 1953, when its first town officials were appointed.

Esperanza is the oldest town in northern Agusan del Sur. It was also the largest town in the province by land area until several municipalities were created out its territory in the late 20th century: Las Nieves, San Luis, Sibagat, and Bayugan, which later became a city and has surpassed its mother town in terms of economy and population.

=== The Golden Tara ===
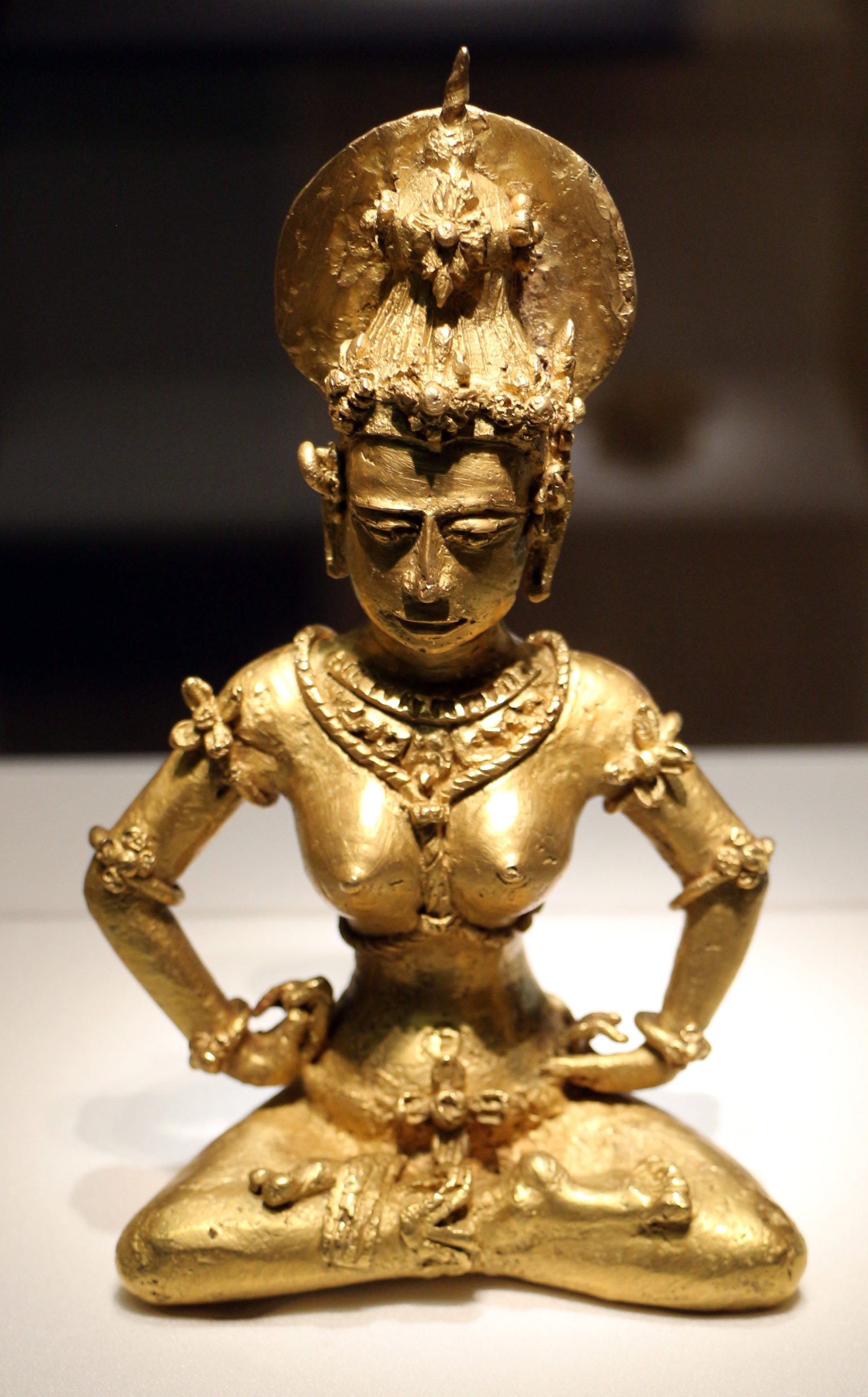
The Golden Tara that had been found in Esperanza, is now housed in a museum in Chicago, United States.

In July 1917, a flood and storm swept through Agusan del Sur. In Barangay Cubo of Esperanza, a Manobo woman named Bilay Ocampo was on the banks of the muddy Wawa River after the storm, and she found a figure washed up. The 21-karat gold statue dating to around 850 to 950 A.D. weighs 4 pounds (1.8 kg) and depicts a woman sitting in the lotus position in Buddhism fashion, wearing jewellery on her body, and a headdress. This figure turned out to be a representation of the Bodhisattva Tara. Now known as the "Golden Tara", after its discovery, it was handed to the former Deputy Governor Bias Baclagon then was passed to the Agusan Coconut Company because of a debt. It was then sold and purchased for ₱4,000 by Louise Condit Smith, wife of American Governor-General Leonard Wood, and Fay Cooper-Cole, curator of Chicago Field Museum’s Southeast Asian department. They then donated the Golden Tara to the Field Museum in Chicago, Illinois, United States where it is currently held in the Grainger Hall of Gems. Dr. H. Otley Beyer, known as the father of Philippine Archaeology and Anthropology, tried to encourage the Philippine government to buy the artefact, however all attempts failed due to lack of funds.

Another historical claim has it that when Bilay Ocampo found the Golden Tara, she decided to keep it as a doll. However, she was told to give it to Baclagon because they believed it was a diwata. Because of this, it was previously called Buwawan ni Baclagon or Ginto ni Baclagon (both translates to "Gold of Baclagon"). However, according to Bilay's granddaughter, Constancia, the Golden Tara was not handed over by her grandmother but stolen. The question of the validity of the purchase of the Golden Tara and whether it was acquired legally if it was in fact originally stolen from Bilay remains a subject of debate.

The Golden Tara remains exhibited in the Grainger Hall of Chicago Field Museum (now known as the Field Museum of Natural History) up to the present, and the Philippine government has plans to continue negotiations in re-acquiring the figure.

According to University of the Philippines scholar Dr. Juan Francisco, he described the golden statue as, "One of the most spectacular discoveries in the Philippine archaeological history."

== Geography ==
According to the Philippine Statistics Authority, the municipality has a land area of 1,355.48 square kilometres (523.35 sq mi) constituting 13.57% of the 9,989.52-square-kilometre- (3,856.98 sq mi) total area of Agusan del Sur.

=== Climate ===
Climate data for Esperanza, Agusan del Sur
Month	Jan	Feb	Mar	Apr	May	Jun	Jul	Aug	Sep	Oct	Nov	Dec	Year
Mean daily maximum °C (°F)	28 (82)	28 (82)	29 (84)	30 (86)	30 (86)	30 (86)	30 (86)	30 (86)	30 (86)	30 (86)	29 (84)	28 (82)	29 (85)
Mean daily minimum °C (°F)	23 (73)	23 (73)	22 (72)	23 (73)	24 (75)	24 (75)	24 (75)	24 (75)	24 (75)	24 (75)	24 (75)	23 (73)	24 (74)
Average precipitation mm (inches)	154 (6.1)	101 (4.0)	78 (3.1)	59 (2.3)	95 (3.7)	130 (5.1)	131 (5.2)	137 (5.4)	125 (4.9)	145 (5.7)	141 (5.6)	121 (4.8)	1,417 (55.9)
Average rainy days	17.4	13.9	14.4	14.3	22.3	26.0	27.9	27.5	26.2	26.4	21.4	17.2	254.9
Source: Meteoblue (modeled/calculated data, not measured locally)

=== Barangays ===
Esperanza is politically subdivided into 47 barangays. Each barangay consists of puroks while some have sitios.

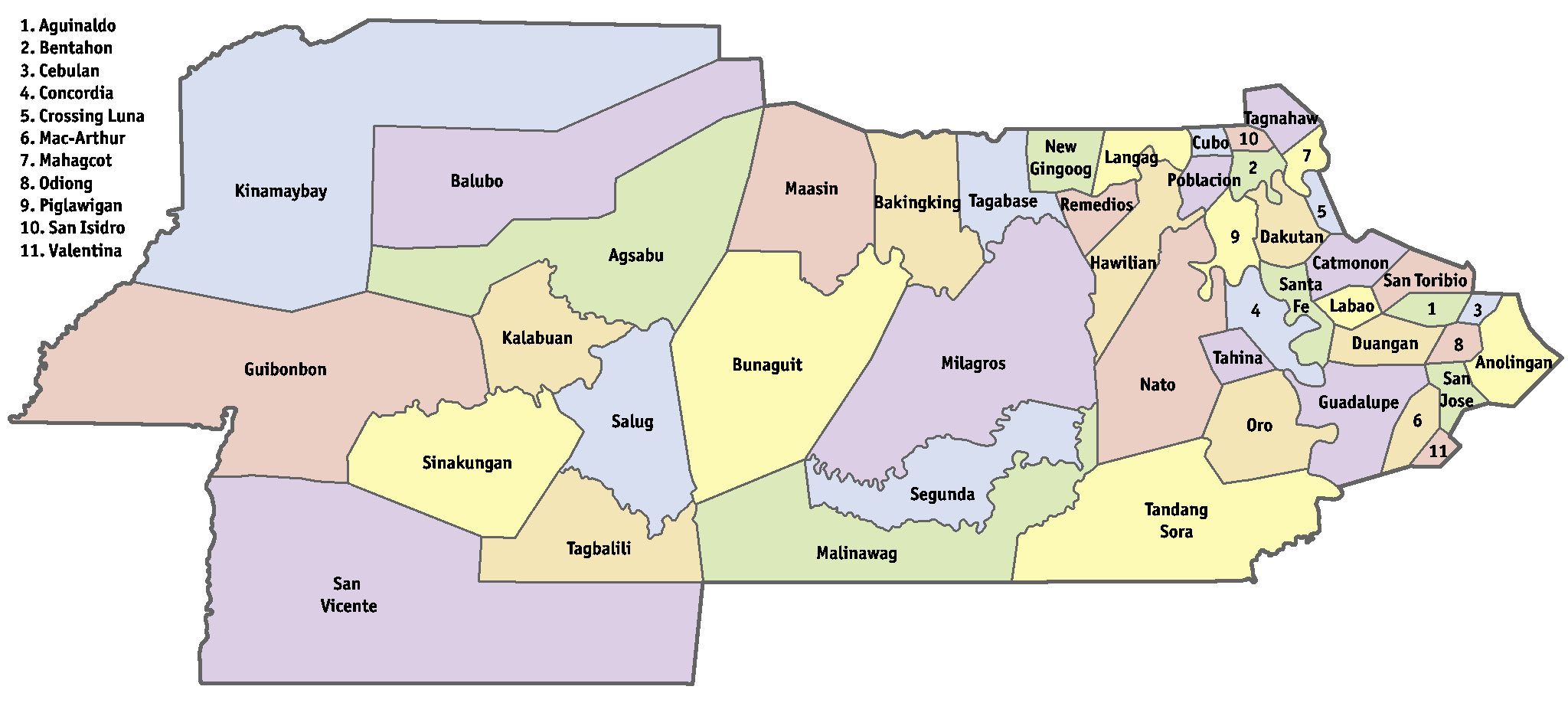
Political map of Esperanza

PSGC	Barangay	Population			±% p.a.	
		2024		2010		
160303031	Agsabu	1.4%	812	612	▴	1.98%
160303032	Aguinaldo	0.9%	540	523	▴	0.22%
160303001	Anolingan	2.8%	1,649	1,567	▴	0.36%
160303002	Bakingking	0.8%	496	462	▴	0.49%
160303033	Balubo	1.4%	816	930	▾	−0.90%
160303003	Bentahon	1.8%	1,084	956	▴	0.88%
160303004	Bunaguit	2.0%	1,192	1,253	▾	−0.35%
160303006	Catmonon	2.9%	1,733	1,654	▴	0.32%
160303034	Cebulan	0.7%	432	316	▴	2.20%
160303007	Concordia	1.6%	935	779	▴	1.28%
160303035	Crossing Luna	2.3%	1,381	1,250	▴	0.70%
160303036	Cubo	1.5%	877	776	▴	0.85%
160303008	Dakutan	5.7%	3,391	3,271	▴	0.25%
160303009	Duangan	2.7%	1,610	1,596	▴	0.06%
160303011	Guadalupe	6.9%	4,046	3,854	▴	0.34%
160303037	Guibonon	0.8%	502	737	▾	−2.63%
160303012	Hawilian	4.0%	2,358	2,147	▴	0.65%
160303038	Kalabuan	0.5%	283	343	▾	−1.33%
160303039	Kinamaybay	1.2%	683	654	▴	0.30%
160303013	Labao	1.6%	930	721	▴	1.78%
160303040	Langag	2.0%	1,197	1,084	▴	0.69%
160303014	Maasin	1.8%	1,091	1,079	▴	0.08%
160303010	Mac-Arthur	0.3%	200	195	▴	0.18%
160303015	Mahagcot	1.4%	841	833	▴	0.07%
160303041	Maliwanag	0.5%	296	163	▴	4.23%
160303016	Milagros	2.0%	1,172	1,145	▴	0.16%
160303017	Nato	2.9%	1,732	1,639	▴	0.38%
160303042	New Gingoog	0.8%	495	420	▴	1.15%
160303043	Odiong	1.1%	622	545	▴	0.92%
160303018	Oro	3.3%	1,922	1,536	▴	1.57%
160303044	Piglawigan	3.2%	1,882	1,623	▴	1.03%
160303019	Poblacion	8.1%	4,778	4,907	▾	−0.18%
160303020	Remedios	2.4%	1,447	1,665	▾	−0.97%
160303021	Salug	2.1%	1,238	1,262	▾	−0.13%
160303045	San Isidro	0.7%	385	358	▴	0.51%
160303046	San Jose	0.3%	150	151	▾	−0.05%
160303022	San Toribio	4.1%	2,424	2,218	▴	0.62%
160303047	San Vicente	1.3%	765	578	▴	1.97%
160303023	Santa Fe	3.4%	1,990	1,698	▴	1.11%
160303024	Segunda	0.5%	293	314	▾	−0.48%
160303048	Sinakungan	0.8%	464	485	▾	−0.31%
160303026	Tagabase	1.4%	827	780	▴	0.41%
160303027	Taganahaw	0.6%	382	376	▴	0.11%
160303028	Tagbalili	0.9%	546	632	▾	−1.01%
160303029	Tahina	1.3%	769	742	▴	0.25%
160303030	Tandang Sora	1.3%	768	732	▴	0.33%
160303049	Valentina	0.6%	375	336	▴	0.77%
	Total		59,065	51,897	▴	0.90%

== Demographics ==
Population census of Esperanza
Year	Pop.	±% p.a.
1918	2,894	—
1939	9,247	+5.69%
1948	8,488	−0.95%
1960	31,825	+11.64%
1970	21,051	−4.04%
1975	23,377	+2.12%
1980	25,257	+1.56%
1990	36,139	+3.65%
1995	42,118	+2.91%
2000	44,151	+1.02%
2007	47,659	+1.06%
2010	51,897	+3.15%
2015	54,801	+1.04%
2020	59,353	+1.69%
2024	59,065	−0.12%
Source: Philippine Statistics Authority

In the 2024 census, Esperanza had a population of 59,065. The population density was 44 inhabitants per square kilometre (110/sq mi).

== Economy ==
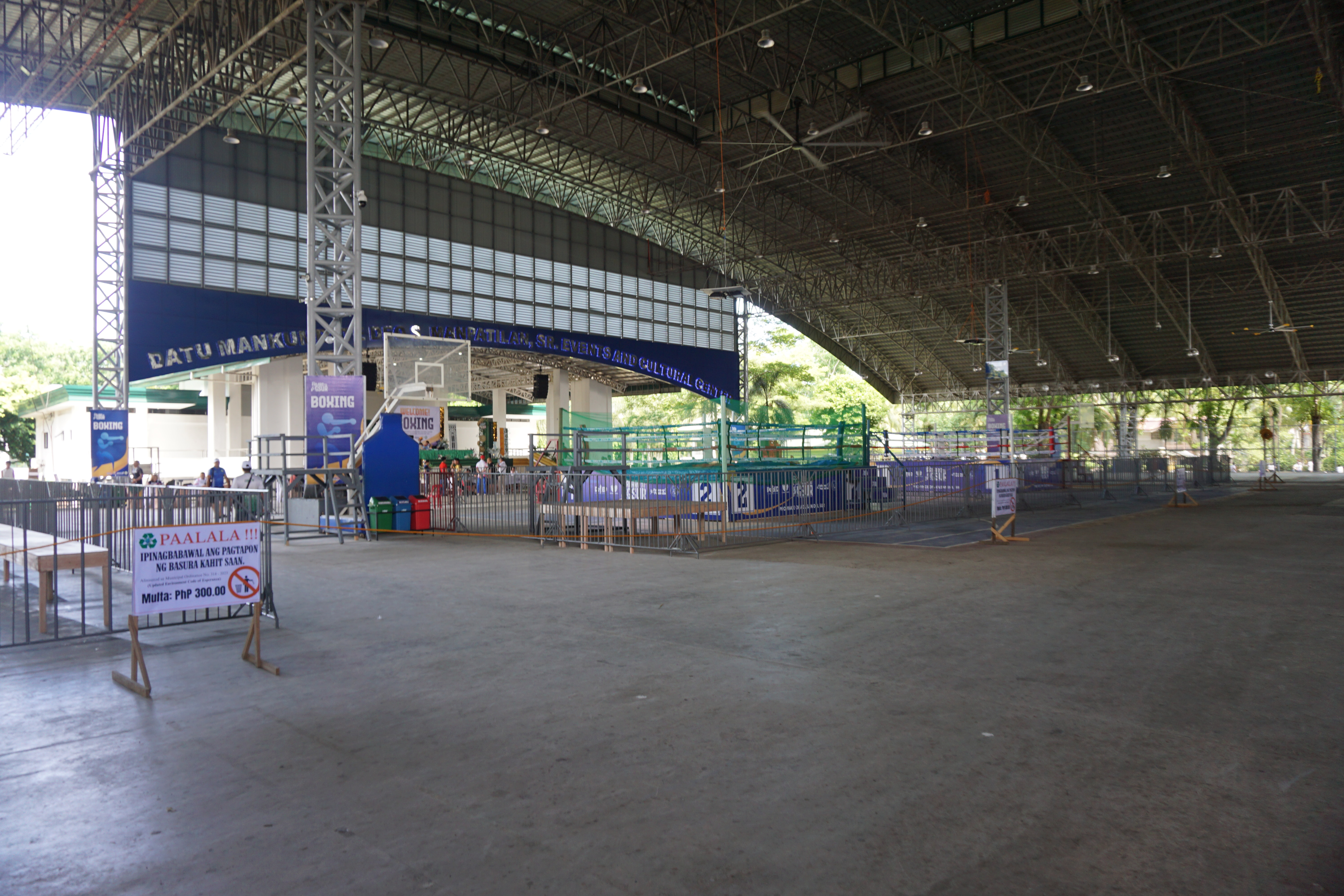
Deo Manpatilan, Sr. Events and Cultural Center

Poverty incidence of Esperanza (%)

Source: Philippine Statistics Authority
