= Andanan River =

River in Agusan del Sur, Philippines

- Wawa River mouth Andanan River (Philippines)
- Native name: Ilog Andanan (Tagalog)

Location
- Country: Philippines
- Region: Caraga
- Province: Agusan del Sur
- Municipality: Sibagat, Bayugan

Physical characteristics
- Source
  - location: Sibagat, Agusan del Sur, Caraga Region
- Mouth: Wawa River
  - location: Maygatasan, Bayugan
  - coordinates: 8°43′16″N 125°42′58″E
- Length: 38 km (24 mi)
- Basin size: 12 km^{2} (4.6 sq mi)
- Discharge
  - location: Wawa River
  - average: 42 m^{3}/s (1,500 cu ft/s)

Basin features
- Progression: Andanan–Wawa–Agusan

The Andanan River (Tagalog: Ilog Andanan; Cebuano: Suba sa Andanan) is a stream located in Sibagat, Agusan del Sur and Bayugan, Caraga Region, Philippines. It is a tributary of the larger Wawa River.

== Geography ==
The Andanan River is situated approximately 8.85089, 125.814 on the island of Mindanao.

The Andanan River headwaters from the Diwata Mountain Range of Sibagat, Agusan del Sur. It traverses along Barangay New Tubigon in Sibagat and the riverbank barangays of Bayugan namely: San Juan, Berseba, Santo Niño, Calaitan, Santa Irene and Noli where its mouth is located in Barangay Maygatasan joins with the larger Wawa River. The Wawa River is one of the larger and longer rivers in the province of Agusan del Sur and a tributary river to the Agusan River.

== Crossings ==
There are two permanent bridges that cross the Andanan River:

- Andanan Bridge (1) – Barangay Maygatasan, Bayugan along the Pan-Philippine Highway Butuan-Davao Road
- Andanan Bridge (2) – Barangay New Tubigon, Sibagat, Agusan del Sur along the Butuan-Tandag Road that serves as road boundary connecting Barangay New Tubigon of Sibagat and Barangay San Juan of Bayugan.

== Watershed ==
The Andanan River and its surrounding areas was declared as a nature reserve called the Andanan Watershed Forest Reserve (AWFR) proclaimed by virtue of Philippine Presidential Proclamation No. 734 dated May 29, 1991, with an area of 15,097 hectares comprises with eight (8) barangays namely; Sta. Irene, Calaitan, Berseba, Sto. Niño, Mt. Carmel, Mt. Ararat, San Juan all of Bayugan and Barangay New Tubigon in Sibagat, Agusan del Sur.

The areas of the Andanan River is being proposed as Andanan Natural Park under the National Integrated Protected Areas System (NIPAS). This protected area has its own biological features of fauna and flora dipterocarp and premium species. Ecotourism sites like caves, waterfalls, lakes and unique rock formations are the mere features for tourist destination.

The area covered by the proclamation is under the administrative jurisdiction, supervision and control of the Philippines Department of Environment and Natural Resources through its Forest management Bureau in coordination with other government agencies with the objective of maintaining its usefulness as a source of water for domestic, agriculture, power generation and other forestry purposes.

the Andanan River Watershed supports potable drinking water and irrigation for Bayugan, Sibagat, and other areas of Agusan del Sur.

== See also ==
- Agusan River
- Wawa River (Agusan del Sur)
- Sibagat River
- Sibagat, Agusan del Sur
- Bayugan
- Agusan del Sur Province
- List of rivers of the Philippines
