= San Luis, Agusan del Sur =

Municipality in Agusan del Sur, Philippines

San Luis
- Municipality
- Municipality of San Luis
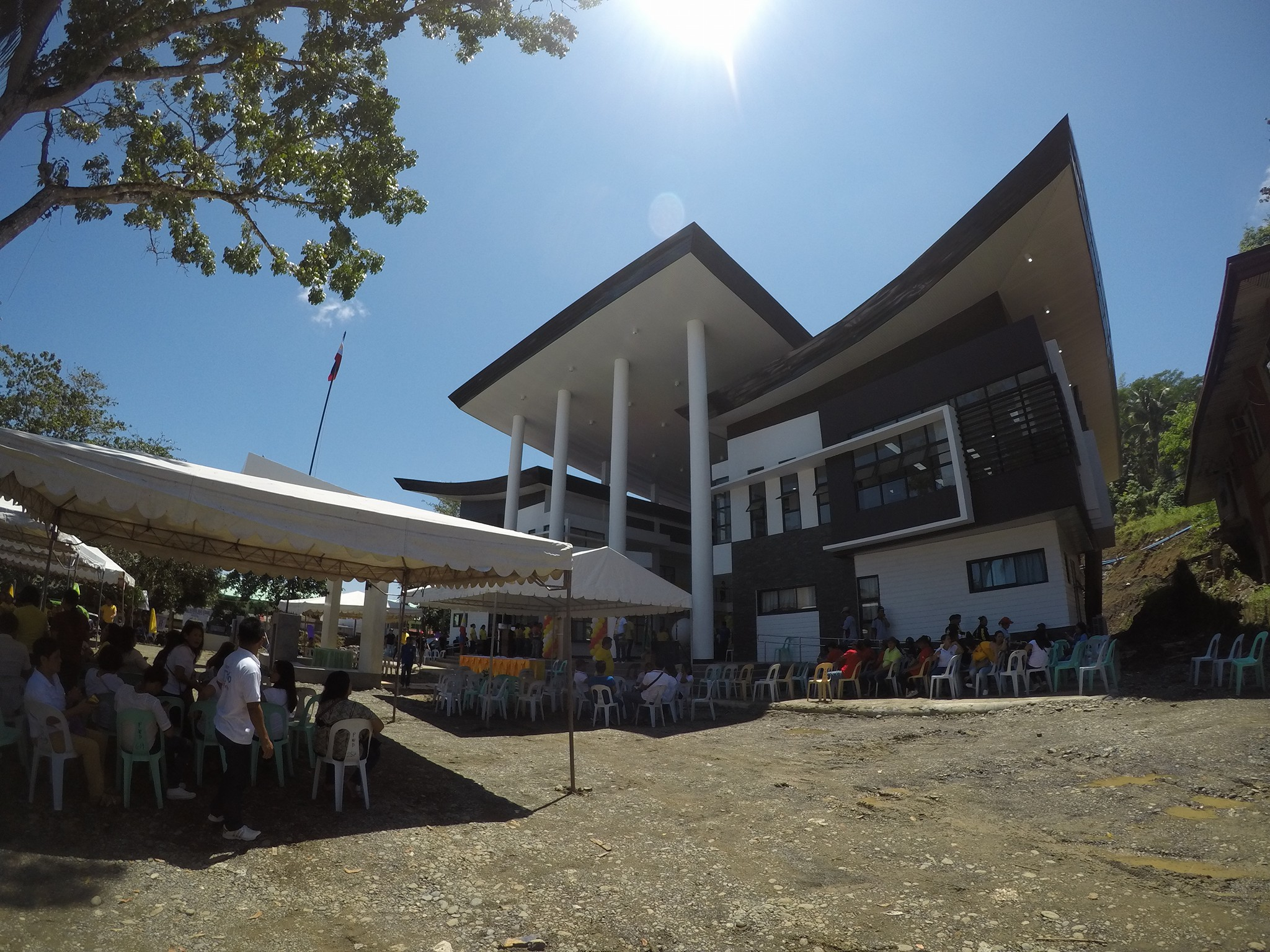
- Municipal Hall

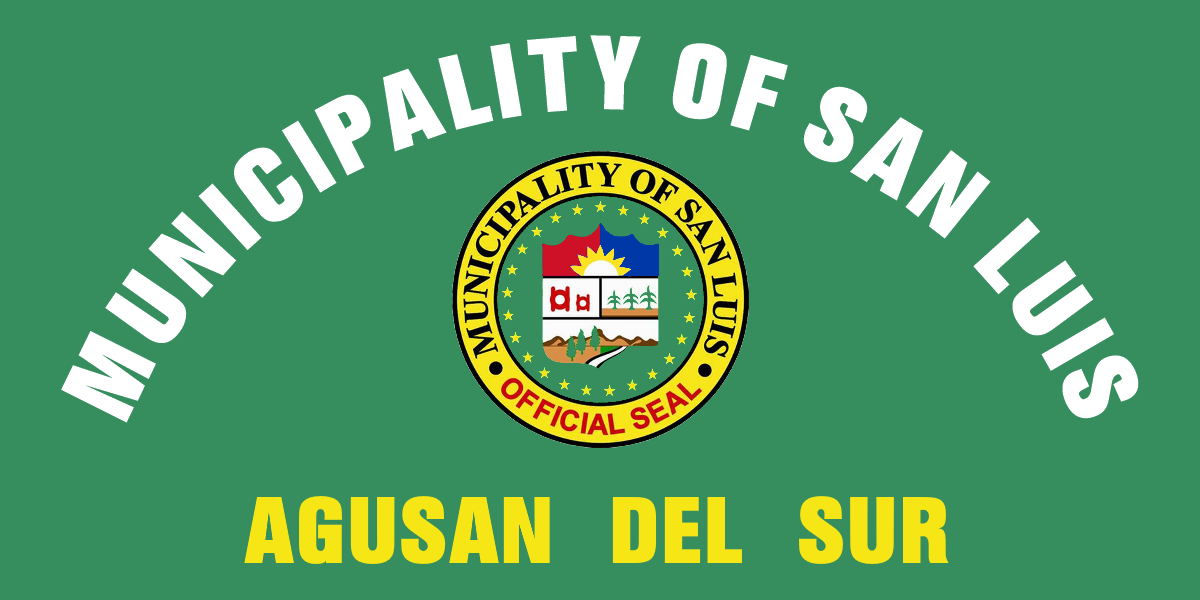
- Flag
- Motto: "Sinag San Luis."
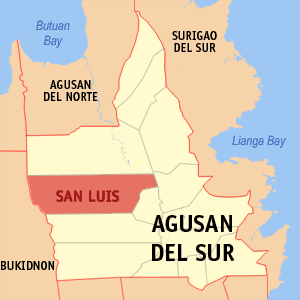
- Map of Agusan del Sur with San Luis highlighted
- Interactive map of San Luis
- Location within the Philippines
- Coordinates: 8°30′N 125°44′E
- Country: Philippines
- Region: Caraga
- Province: Agusan del Sur
- District: 1st district
- Barangays: 25 (see Barangays)

Government
  - Type: Sangguniang Bayan
  - Mayor: Ronaldo Y. Corvera
  - Vice Mayor: Ely B. Yecyec
  - Representative: Alfelito M. Bascug
  - Electorate: 21,125 voters (2025)

Area
  - Total: 950.5 km^{2} (367.0 sq mi)
- Elevation: 342 m (1,122 ft)
- Highest elevation: 1,880 m (6,170 ft)
- Lowest elevation: 9 m (30 ft)

Population (2024 census)
  - Total: 36,264
  - Density: 38.15/km^{2} (98.81/sq mi)
  - Households: 7,836

Economy
  - Income class: 1st municipal income class
  - Poverty incidence: 37.09% (2023)
  - Revenue: ₱ 430.2 million (2024)
  - Assets: ₱ 845.7 million (2024)
  - Expenditure: ₱ 369.8 million (2024)
  - Liabilities: ₱ 462.6 million (2024)

Service provider
  - Electricity: Agusan del Sur Electric Cooperative (ASELCO)
- Time zone: UTC+8 (PST)
- ZIP code: 8511
- PSGC: 1600309000
- IDD : area code: +63 (0)85
- Native languages: Agusan; Butuanon; Higaonon; Tagalog

San Luis, officially the Municipality of San Luis (Cebuano: Lungsod sa San Luis; Tagalog: Bayan ng San Luis), is a municipality in the province of Agusan del Sur, Philippines. According to the 2024 census, it has a population of 36,264 people.

San Luis was created into a municipality on June 15, 1968, when the barrios of San Luis, Santa Inez, Nuevo Trabajo, Cualision and Baylo were separated from the municipality of Esperanza and constituted into the new town, through Republic Act 5262. Since the 1970s, the town's economy has been largely based on logging industries.

== Geography ==
San Luis is located at 8°30′N 125°44′E.

According to the Philippine Statistics Authority, the municipality has a land area of 950.5 square kilometres (367.0 sq mi) constituting 9.51% of the 9,989.52-square-kilometre- (3,856.98 sq mi) total area of Agusan del Sur.

=== Climate ===
Climate data for San Luis, Agusan del Sur
Month	Jan	Feb	Mar	Apr	May	Jun	Jul	Aug	Sep	Oct	Nov	Dec	Year
Mean daily maximum °C (°F)	27 (81)	28 (82)	28 (82)	30 (86)	30 (86)	30 (86)	30 (86)	30 (86)	30 (86)	30 (86)	29 (84)	28 (82)	29 (84)
Mean daily minimum °C (°F)	23 (73)	23 (73)	23 (73)	23 (73)	24 (75)	24 (75)	24 (75)	24 (75)	24 (75)	24 (75)	23 (73)	23 (73)	24 (74)
Average precipitation mm (inches)	105 (4.1)	72 (2.8)	55 (2.2)	40 (1.6)	69 (2.7)	94 (3.7)	100 (3.9)	103 (4.1)	99 (3.9)	106 (4.2)	85 (3.3)	63 (2.5)	991 (39)
Average rainy days	17.6	16.0	14.9	14.0	20.9	24.3	25.3	25.5	24.5	24.7	19.7	16.7	244.1
Source: Meteoblue

=== Barangays ===
San Luis is politically subdivided into 25 barangays. Each barangay consists of puroks while some have sitios.

PSGC	Barangay	Population			±% p.a.	
		2024		2010		
160309001	Anislagan	5.5%	1,998	1,947	▴	0.18%
160309008	Balit	2.4%	868	1,139	▾	−1.87%
160309002	Baylo	4.3%	1,555	1,328	▴	1.10%
160309009	Binicalan	9.2%	3,353	3,103	▴	0.54%
160309010	Cecilia	3.1%	1,135	1,136	▾	−0.01%
160309003	Coalicion	3.9%	1,398	1,643	▾	−1.11%
160309004	Culi	2.8%	1,008	1,035	▾	−0.18%
160309011	Dimasalang	3.8%	1,387	1,360	▴	0.14%
160309012	Don Alejandro	7.2%	2,600	2,648	▾	−0.13%
160309013	Don Pedro	0.7%	241	294	▾	−1.37%
160309014	Doña Flavia	7.2%	2,614	2,529	▴	0.23%
160309025	Doña Maxima	4.0%	1,467	1,522	▾	−0.26%
160309015	Mahagsay	2.8%	1,009	1,242	▾	−1.43%
160309016	Mahapag	2.0%	730	695	▴	0.34%
160309017	Mahayahay	2.2%	795	1,135	▾	−2.44%
160309018	Muritula	2.0%	743	769	▾	−0.24%
160309005	Nuevo Trabajo	5.2%	1,876	1,725	▴	0.58%
160309006	Poblacion	5.0%	1,815	1,653	▴	0.65%
160309019	Policarpo	1.3%	486	533	▾	−0.64%
160309020	San Isidro	2.2%	807	955	▾	−1.16%
160309021	San Pedro	3.4%	1,219	1,567	▾	−1.73%
160309007	Santa Ines	4.8%	1,748	1,453	▴	1.29%
160309022	Santa Rita	0.8%	301	456	▾	−2.84%
160309023	Santiago	1.4%	499	465	▴	0.49%
160309024	Wegguam	1.3%	457	401	▴	0.91%
	Total		36,264	32,733	▴	0.71%

== Demographics ==
Population census of San Luis
Year	Pop.	±% p.a.
1918	2,850	—
1970	7,531	+1.89%
1975	12,226	+10.21%
1980	12,793	+0.91%
1990	18,521	+3.77%
1995	21,910	+3.20%
2000	25,901	+3.65%
2007	30,424	+2.24%
2010	32,733	+2.70%
2015	32,109	−0.37%
2020	35,196	+1.95%
2024	36,264	+0.72%
Source: Philippine Statistics Authority

In the 2024 census, San Luis had a population of 36,264. The population density was 38 inhabitants per square kilometre (98/sq mi).

== Economy ==
Poverty incidence of San Luis (%)

Source: Philippine Statistics Authority
