= Agusan River =

River in Mindanao, Philippines

Agusan River Rio Grande de Agusan
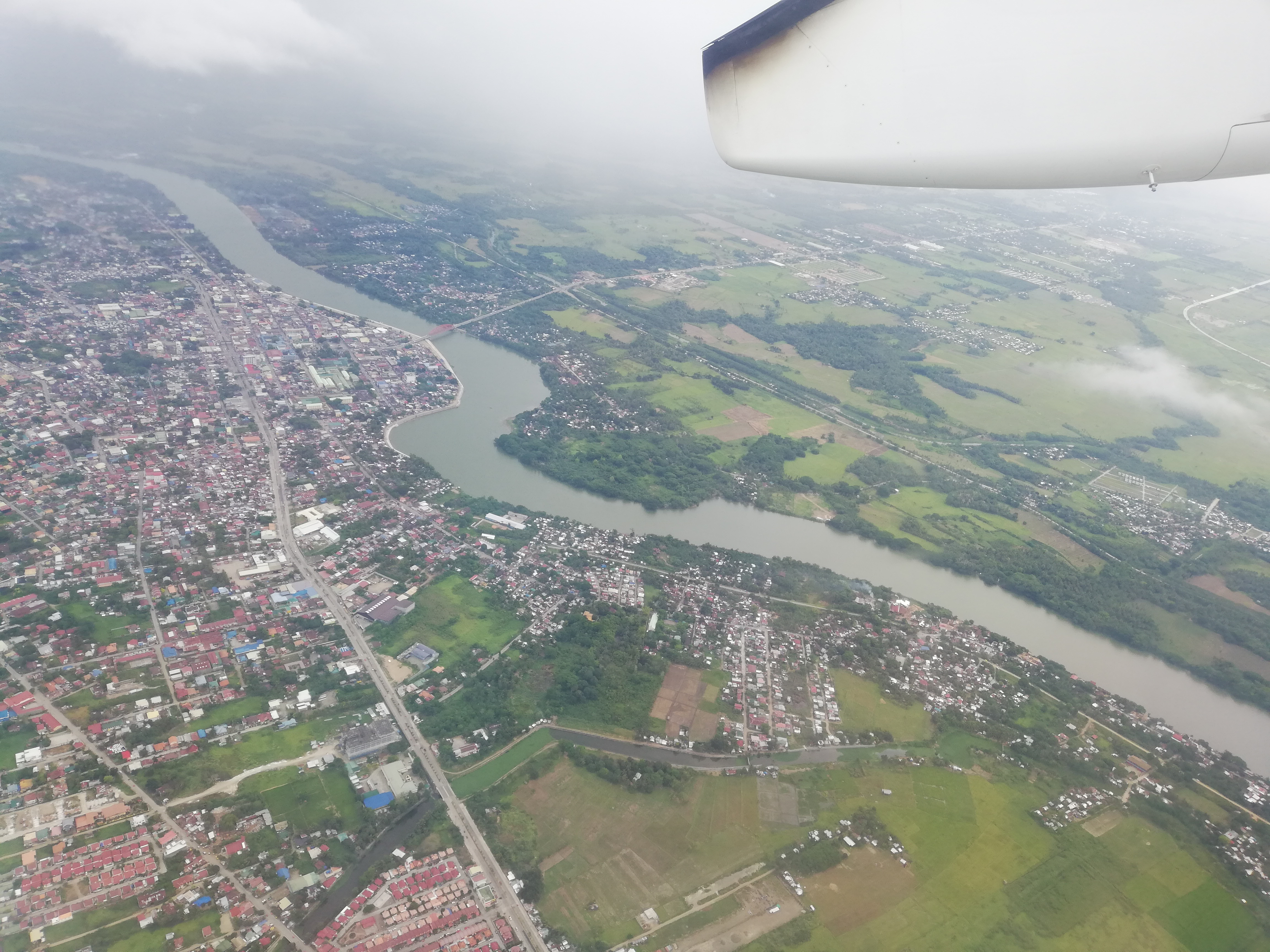
- The Agusan River at Butuan City

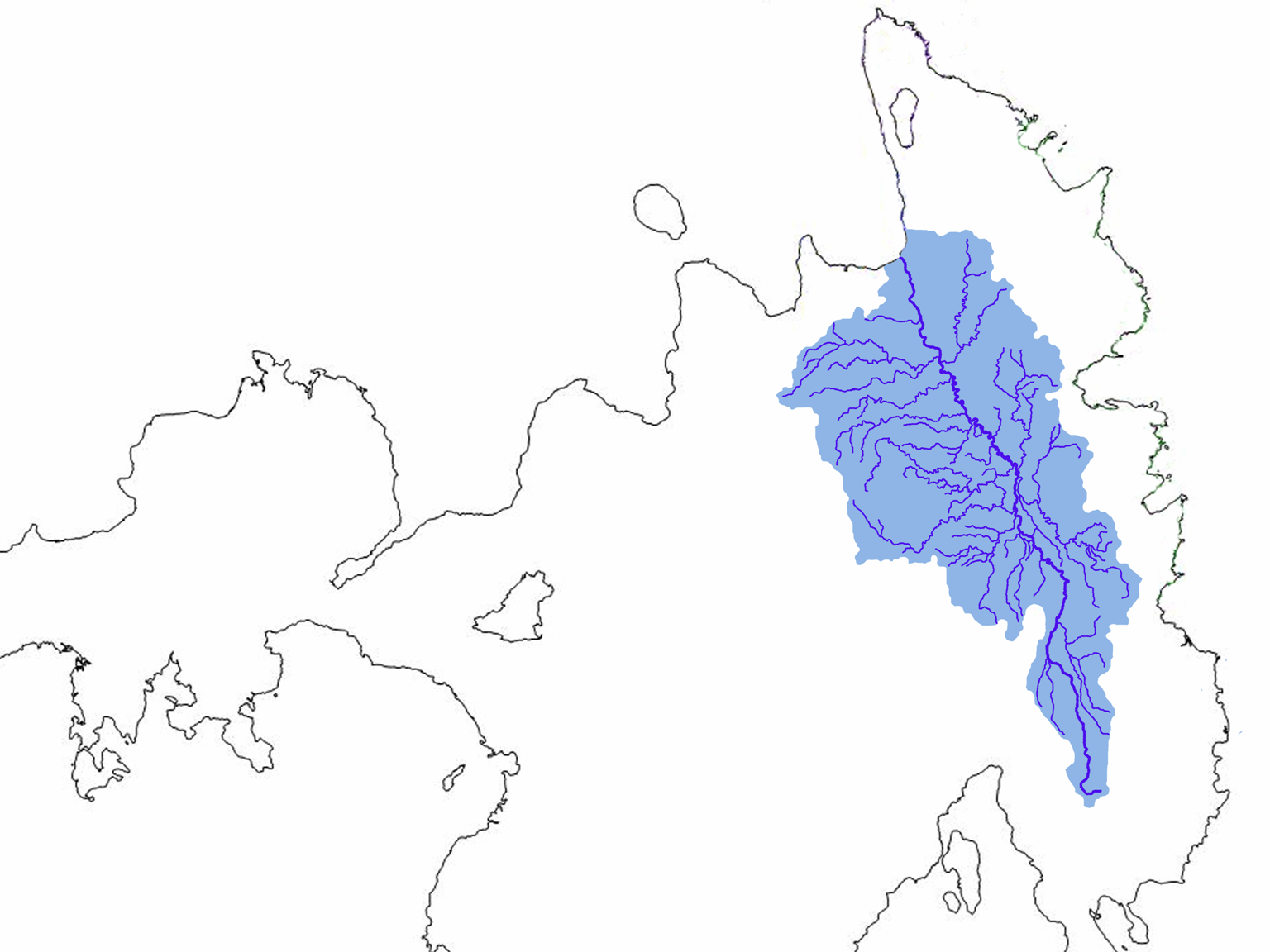
- Agusan River drainage basin

- Agusan River mouth Agusan River (Philippines)

Location
- Country: Philippines
- Region: Caraga; Davao Region
- Province: Agusan del Sur
- Cities/municipalities: Butuan; Bayugan

Physical characteristics
- Source: Mount Tagubud, Pantukan, Davao de Oro
  - location: Davao del Norte
  - coordinates: 7°26′35″N 126°13′16″E
  - elevation: 1,022 m (3,353 ft)
- Mouth: Butuan Bay
  - location: Butuan
  - coordinates: 9°01′00″N 125°30′40″E
  - elevation: 0 m (0 ft)
- Length: 349 km (217 mi)
- Basin size: 11,937 km^{2} (4,609 sq mi)
- Discharge
  - average: 940 m^{3}/s (33,000 cu ft/s)
  - maximum: 4,600 m^{3}/s (160,000 cu ft/s)

Basin features
- Tributaries
  - left: Umayam River; Bansa River; Ojot River; Manat River; Bugabos River
  - right: Wawa River; Andanan River; Gibong River; Choco River in Davao de Oro; Ulip River

The Agusan River is third longest river in the Philippines, located in the north-eastern part of Mindanao island, draining majority of the Caraga region and some parts of Davao de Oro. It is the country's third largest river (after the Cagayan River and Rio Grande de Mindanao) with a total drainage area of 11,937 square kilometres (4,609 sq mi) and an estimated length of 349 kilometres (217 mi) from its origin.

== Geography ==
The headwaters of the river are found in the mountains of Davao de Oro, near its border with Davao Oriental and east of Tagum. It flows through the wide Agusan River valley which measures 177 kilometers (110 mi) from south to north and varies from 32–48 kilometers (20–30 miles) in width. It finally drains into Butuan Bay at its mouth in Butuan.

One of the prominent features in the Agusan River basin is the presence of the Agusan Marsh covering a total area of 19,197 hectares (47,440 acres). The marsh serves a flood retention basin for the Agusan River, cutting the high discharge of water causing flash floods in the lower reaches of the river. Aside from that, the marsh harbors unique and pristine habitats like the sago and peat swamps forest and is a home to endangered and endemic flora and fauna. As a consequence, it was designated a wildlife sanctuary by then-President Fidel V. Ramos in 1996.

=== Watershed ===
The Agusan River basin is divided into three sub-basins on the basis of topographic features: the upper Agusan River basin, the middle Agusan River basin, and the lower Agusan River basin. The upper Agusan River basin is the section from its headwaters in the mountains of Davao de Oro to Santa Josefa, Agusan del Sur to Veruela, Agusan del Sur, the middle Agusan River basin is the section of the river from Santa Josefa to Amparo, Agusan del Sur while the lower Agusan River basin is from Amparo to its mouth at Butuan.

== See also ==
- List of rivers of the Philippines
- Agusan Dam
