= Allan Amoguis =

Italian bishop (born 1973)

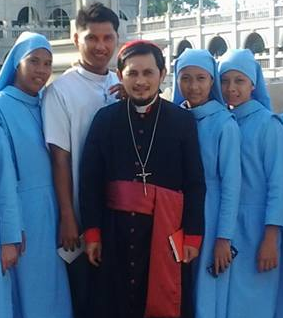
- Allan Amoguis in the Philippines

Orders
- Ordination: 22 July 2012
- Consecration: 3 February 2013

Personal details
- Born: Allan Hinautan Amoguis; February 25, 1973 Butuan, Philippines
- Denomination: Roman Catholicism (until 2005); Orthodox Christianity (since 2005)
- Motto: Fac alteri ut tibi vis
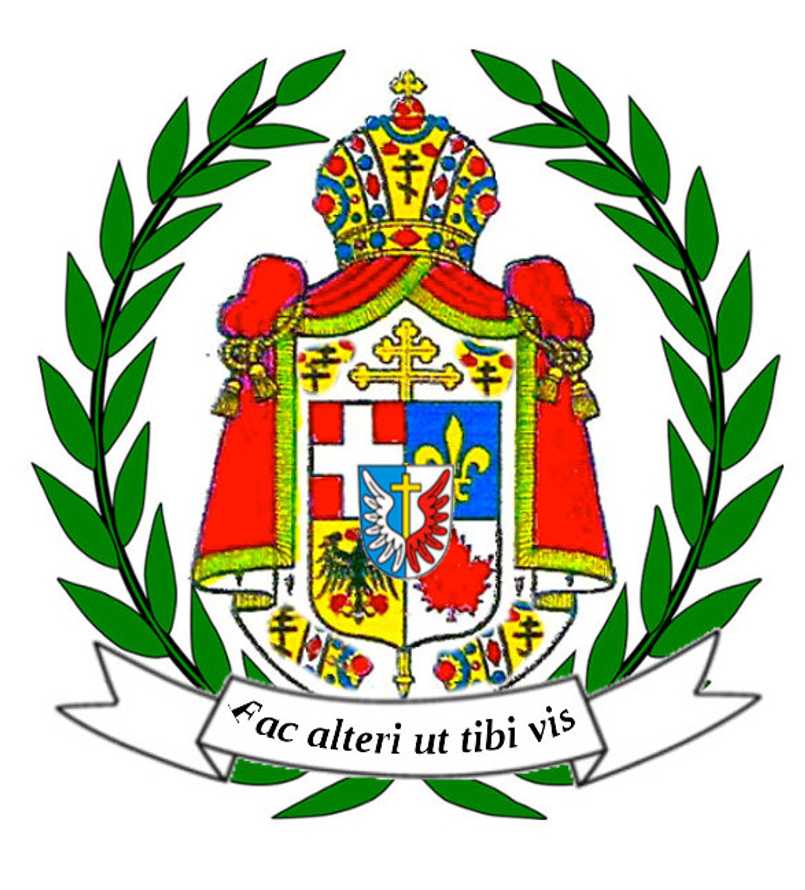
- Coat of arms

Allan Amoguis (born Allan Hinautan Amoguis on 25 February 1973 in the Philippines) is an Italian bishop, serving as the head prelate of The Christian Patriarchate of East Asia.

== Biography ==
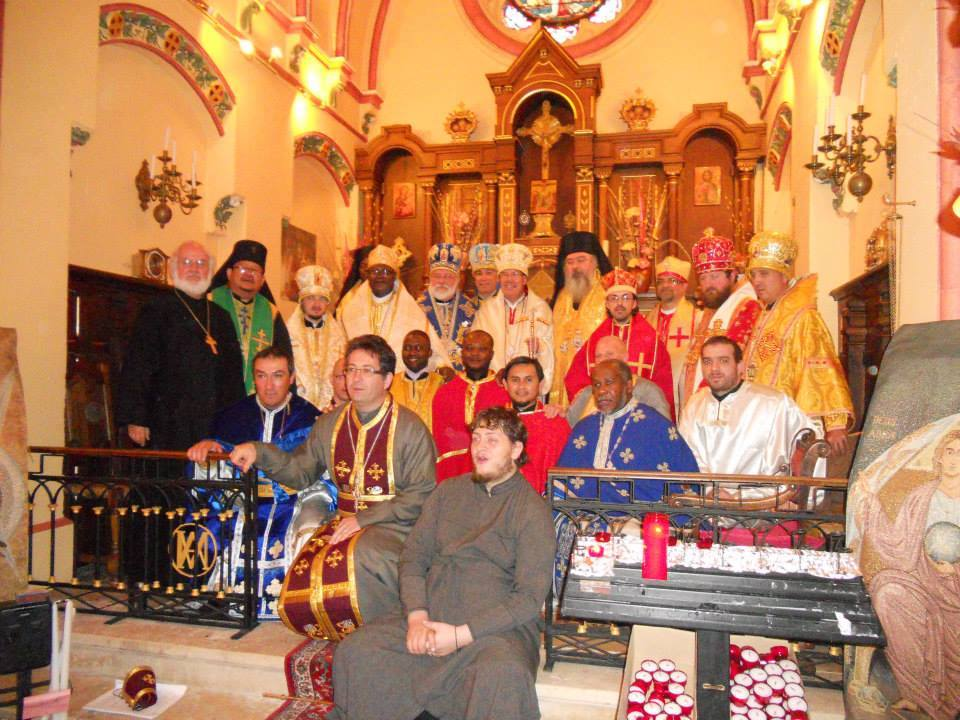
Amoguis at the Monastery of Sainte Marie, France

He graduated with a bachelor's degree in education from Don Bosco College-Seminary (which, later, became Don Bosco College) in the Philippines, where he, at the same time, was discerning for his vocation to the priesthood in the Roman Catholic Church.

After his college graduation in 1996, he worked at the Office of the Philippine President in Malacanang Palace, in the Department of Budget and Management. With his professional Civil Service Eligibility, he got a permanent position in that department.

During his seminary years at the Immaculate Conception Major Seminary, a Roman Catholic seminary in the Philippines, he served as the Editor-in-Chief of the Insight, the seminary's official English magazine. He also contributed articles to the United Catholic Asian News (UCAN) and the Philippine Daily Inquirer, fighting against labor law violations and social injustice.

He converted to the Orthodox faith in 2005, and in 2016 was awarded a master's degree in Management and Development of Education Services (with the title of Doctor) by LUMSA University in Rome, Italy.

He is the titular head of the Monastery of the Catholic Orthodox Church of the Holy Trinity in the Philippines and the Chiesa Cattolica Ortodossa della Santa Trinita in Italy.

== Apostolic Succession ==
Apostle Andrew, Tradition sustains, established the Church in the See of Byzantium (later Constantinople and Istanbul), followed by a line of bishops and patriarchs.
Patriarch Joachim III of Constantinople
Metropolitans Chrysostom and Germanos
Matthew of Bresthena
Metropolitan Callistus of Corinth
Cyprian Koutsoumbas of Oropos and Fili
Metropolitan Antonio De Rosso of Florence, Mets. Evloghios (Hessler) and Vigile
Metropolitan Basilio Grillo Miceli of Ravenna and L'Aquila
Monsignor Chrysostomos of Sicily and Monsignor Dionysios of Rome
Monsignor Allan (Irenaeus) Amoguis of Frosinone

== Publications ==
Amoguis, Allan H. The Economics of Education and the Future of Societies. Frosinone: Savvy Publishing Company, 2017. ISBN 978-88-90-2396-8-7.
Amoguis, Allan H. The Role of Montessori in Educating Children of this Generation and Beyond. Frosinone: Savvy Publishing Company, 2016. ISBN 978-88-90-2396-2-5.
Amoguis, Allan H. The Death of Education. Frosinone: Savvy Publishing Company, 2015. ISBN 978-88-90-2396-7-0.
Amoguis, Allan H. Surviving in the Seminary. Frosinone: Savvy Publishing Company, 2008. ISBN 978-88-90-2396-6-3.
Amoguis, Allan H. English Grammar: A teaching guide for elementary and advanced learners of English. Frosinone: Savvy Publishing Company, 2006. ISBN 978-88-90-2396-3-2.
