= BioGeM =

BioGeM Institute
- Established: 2006
- Mission: Biological research
- Focus: Molecular genetics
- President: Ortensio Zecchino
- Address: Camporeale
- Location: Ariano Irpino, Italy
- Coordinates: 41.199442°N 15.134100°E
- Interactive map of BioGeM Institute
- Website: http://www.biogem.it
- Location in Italy

The BioGeM Institute (Biologia e Genetica Molecolare, "Biology and Molecular Genetics") is a nonprofit consortium formed by the National Research Council (CNR), the University of Naples "Federico II", the LUMSA of Rome, the Trieste AREA Science Park, the University of Udine, the Stazione Zoologica Anton Dohrn of Naples, the University of Sannio in Benevento, the University of Foggia, the University of Milan Bicocca, the Second University and the Suor Orsola Benincasa University of Naples, the Chamber of Commerce of Avellino and the local mountain community of Ufita Valley.

BioGeM was inaugurated in 2006 by Nobel laureate Rita Levi Montalcini and comprises research laboratories, services and teaching facilities. Scientific research, led by “Gaetano Salvatore” Genetics Research Institute (IRGS), takes place within Genetics and Translational Medicine (GTM) department and is aimed at understanding biological mechanisms and identifying the genes involved in the development and proliferation of various human diseases; the research is based on the use of animal models raised in a high level laboratory after the approval of the ethics committee for animal experimentation. Research primarily aims at fighting cancer and degenerative diseases, often in collaboration with international groups.

Furthermore, the pharmacological research is carried out by a proper department named Medicinal Investigational Research (MIR), whose task covers the experimental verification of new drugs and the release of the related certifications. Furthermore, the training activities take place in a specific functional area named Life and Mind Science School (LIMSS).

Since 2010 Biogem has yearly hosted a meeting named Le due culture ("The two cultures") which over the years has been attended by a number of Nobel laureates and also (in 2018) the president of Italy Sergio Mattarella. The objective of the meeting is to find a common ground between humanistic and scientific knowledge.

The institute also hosts an office of Sopra Steria, a French company specialized in consulting and digital services. Since 2013 Biogem has a forensic genetics laboratory too.

== Museum ==
Within the research center there is also Biogeo, a museum dedicated to the origins of geological history throughout the eras from the Precambrian until the Jurassic. Founded in collaboration with the National Institute of Geophysics and Volcanology, the museum attempts to showcase and illustrate the origin and development of life on Earth, with particular regard to the relationship between genome͵ environment and evolution. Starting from 2012, Biogeo has provided itself with a tetrasphere, designed by the Italian physicist Paco Lanciano.
