= Giuliano Volpe =

Italian academic and politician

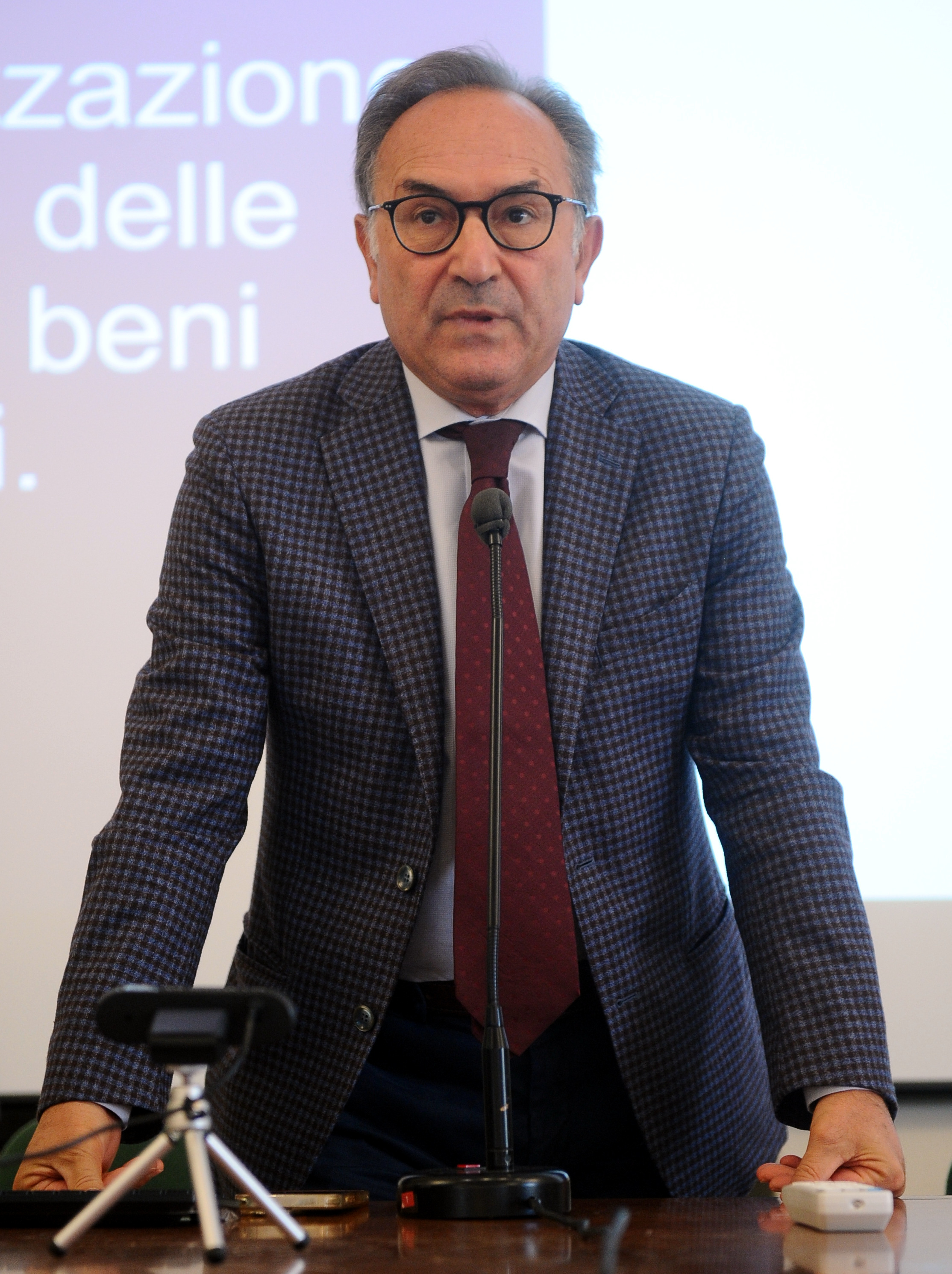
Giuliano Volpe at ItWikiCon 2023 in Bari

Giuliano Volpe (born 1958 in Terlizzi) is an Italian academic and politician.

== Life ==
Volpe was the rector of the University of Foggia from 1 November 2008 to 31 October 2013.

He is currently the president of the Superior Council for Cultural and Scenic Goods of the Ministry of Cultural Heritage and Activities and Tourism (MiBACT).
