= University of Foggia =

Coordinates: 41.4483°N 15.5690°E

- Università degli Studi di Foggia
- Type: Public university
- Established: 1999
- Rector: Professor Maurizio Ricci
- Students: 11,000
- Location: Foggia, Apulia, Italy
- Affiliations: CGU, BioGeM
- Website: www.unifg.it (in Italian); en.unifg.it (in English)

The University of Foggia, located in Foggia, Italy, was founded in 1991 and was fully recognized in 1999. Although it has taken some time for the university to receive its entitlement and acknowledgement, through that timestamp it has branched off from five faculties to six: the Faculty of Economics, the Faculty of Law, the Faculty of Clinical and Experimental Medicine, the Faculty of Medical and Surgical Sciences, the Faculty of Agricultural Sciences, Food and Environment, and the Faculty of the Humanities: Literature, Cultural Heritage, and Educational Sciences. It has also been named as the best university of southern Italy by the newspaper Il Sole 24 Ore, which has full ownership of the Italian employers' federation.

== Departments ==
The University of Foggia is divided into these seven departments:

- Department of Law
- Department of Economics
- Department of Economics, Management and Territory (DEMeT)
- Department of Clinical and Experimental Medicine
- Department of Medical and [Surgical Sciences]
- Department of Sciences of Agriculture, Food and Environment
- Department of Humanities, Literature and Culture Heritage

The University divides departments to aid students into the right department to, as close as possible, match their interests, as well as to avoid confusion.

- The Faculty of Agriculture is organized in 3 departments:
- The Department of Production, Engineering, Mechanical and Applied Economical Science for Agro-Zootechnical Systems
- The Department of Agricultural and Environmental Science, Chemistry and Plant Protection
- The Department of Food Science

The department of Agriculture has expanded from the original small department as enrolments have increased.

== International programs ==
The University itself has agreements with 20 foreign university to accommodate international students, as well as partakes in Socrates/Erasmus, Leonardo and TEMPUS media programs.

== Academic calendar ==
The first semester of the academic calendar for the University of Foggia runs from the third week of September to the second week of December while the second semester runs from the first week of March to the end of May. Classes usually run from Mondays to Fridays, Classes do not run during the month of August as well as on a Bank Holiday. Courses are based on semesters, and within those two semesters there are two holidays around the Christmas and Easter time interval.

== Degree system ==
The degree system is broken down into three sub categories, which are the First-level degrees, the Second-level degrees, and the master's degree, which in Italian is called a "magistrali".

The number of degrees within the main 3 are:

- 22 First-level Degree
- 10 Second-Level Degree
- 3 Master's degrees

== Controversies ==
In November 2018, four academics were fired from the Agrarian Department after their charge of the irregularities in an internal public exam.

== Rectors ==
- Antonio Muscio (1999-2008)
- Giuliano Volpe (2008-2013)
- Maurizio Ricci (2013 - 2019)
- Pierpaolo Limone (2019 - 2023)
- Lorenzo Lo Muzio (2023 - in charge)

== See also ==
- List of Italian universities
- Foggia
- BioGeM consortium
