= Butuan =

Highly-urbanized city in Caraga Region, Philippines

- Highly urbanized city
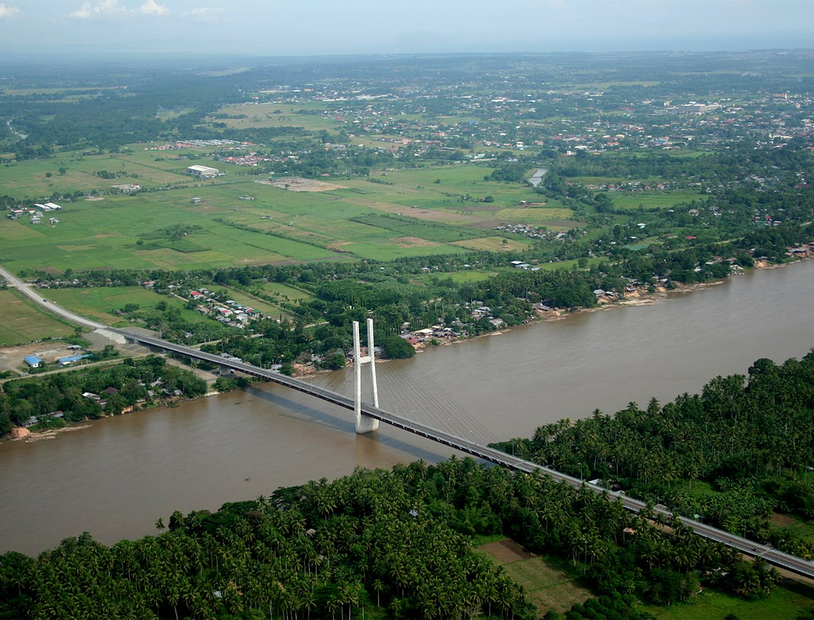
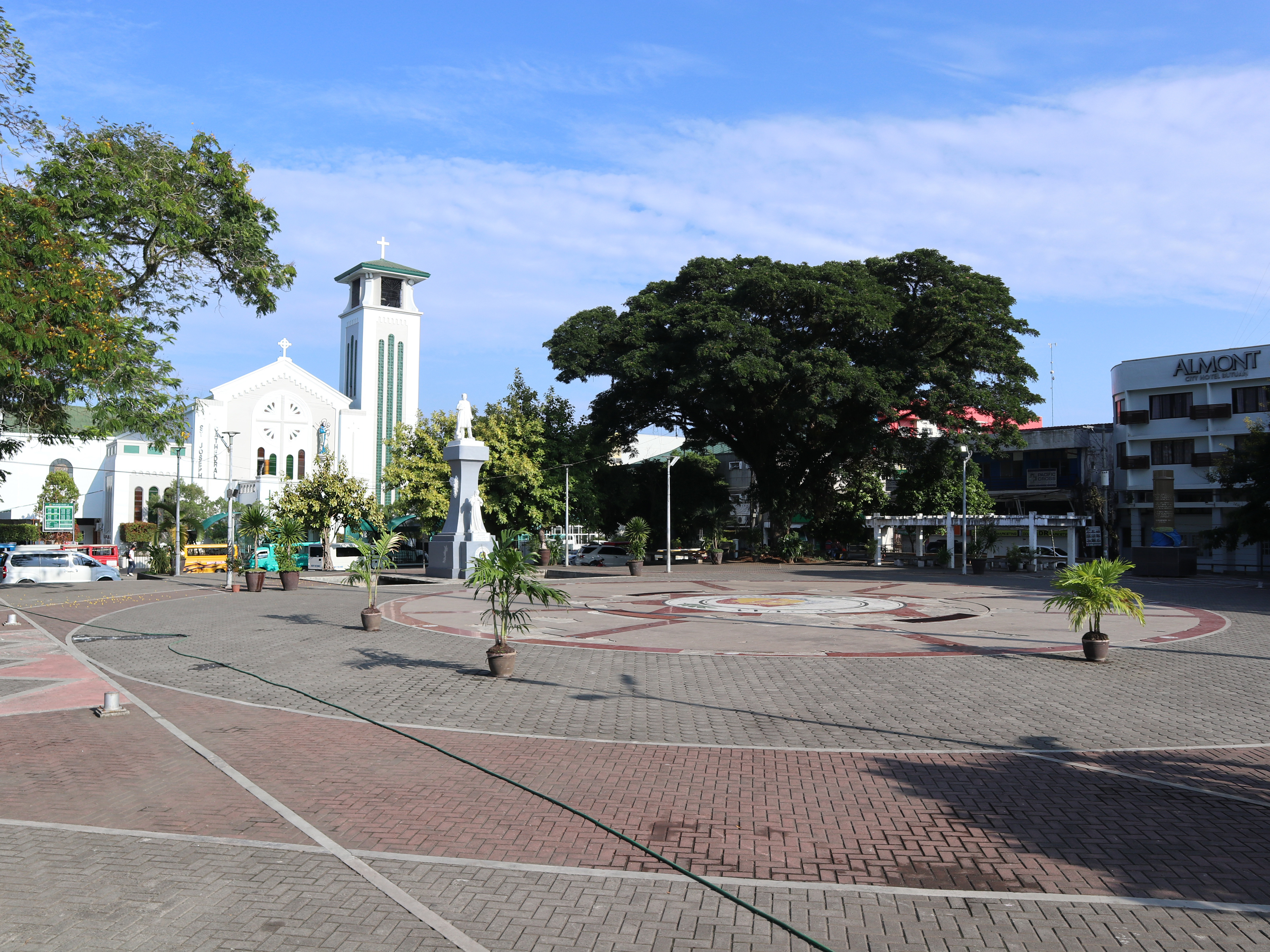
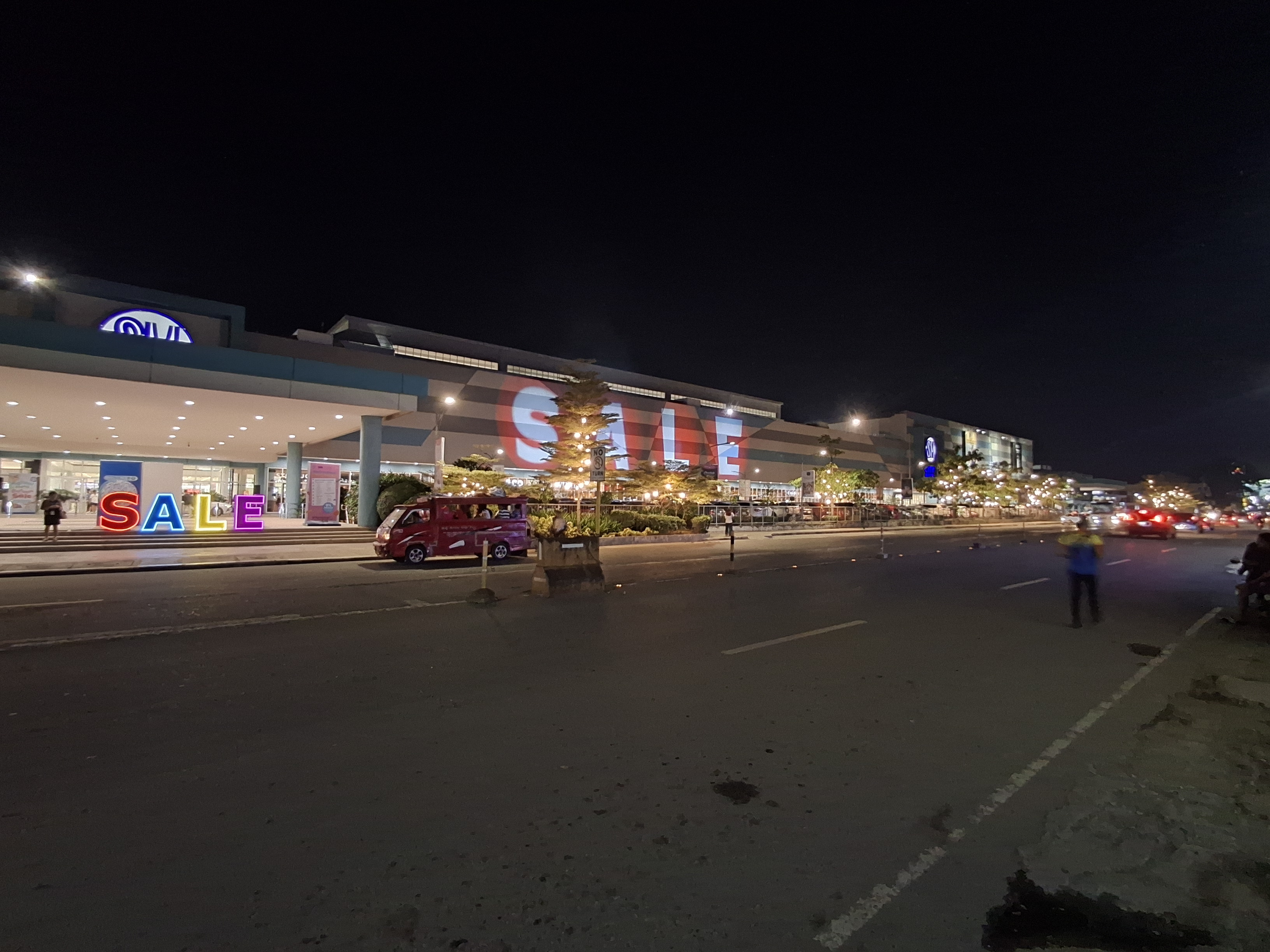
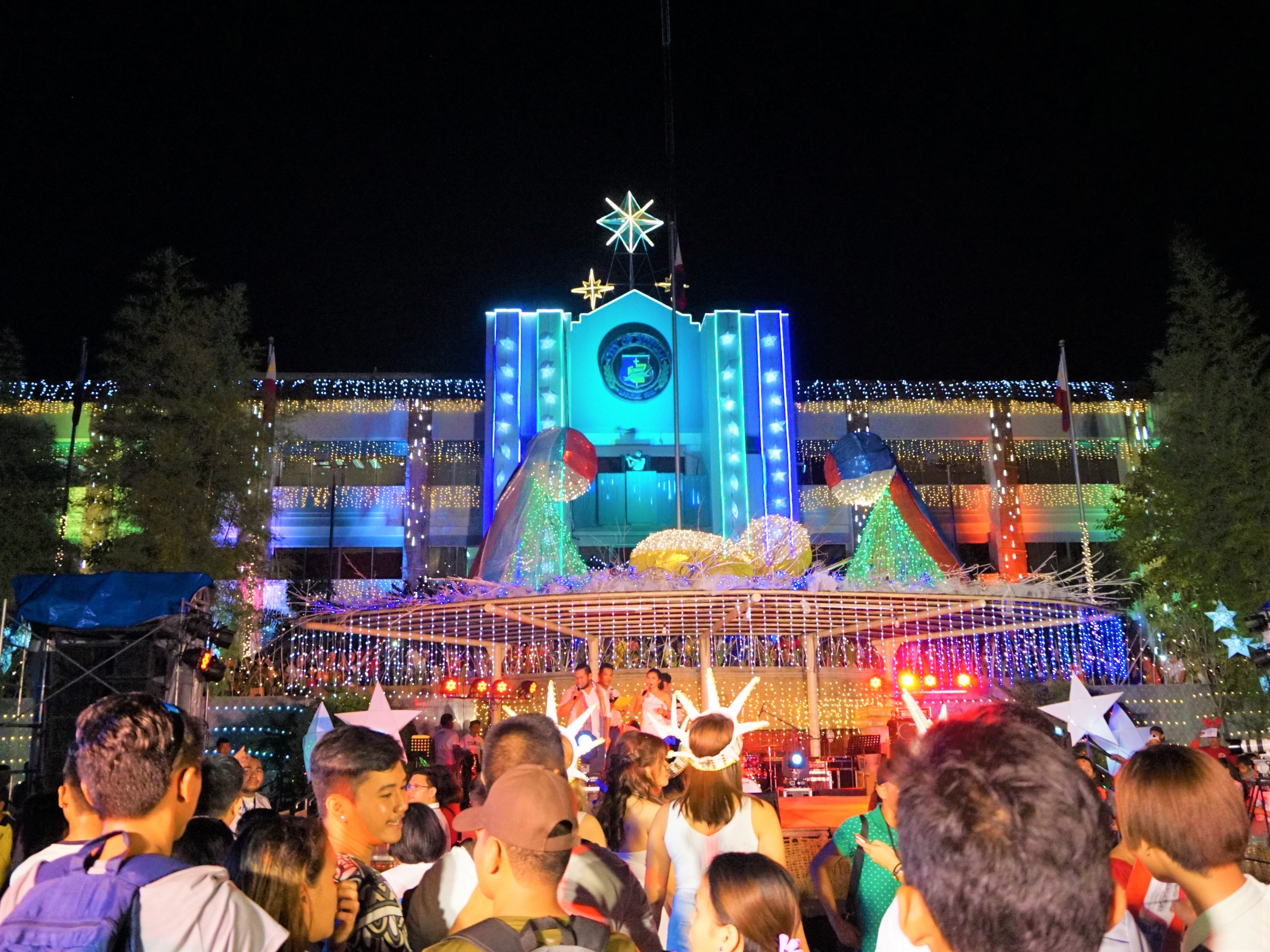
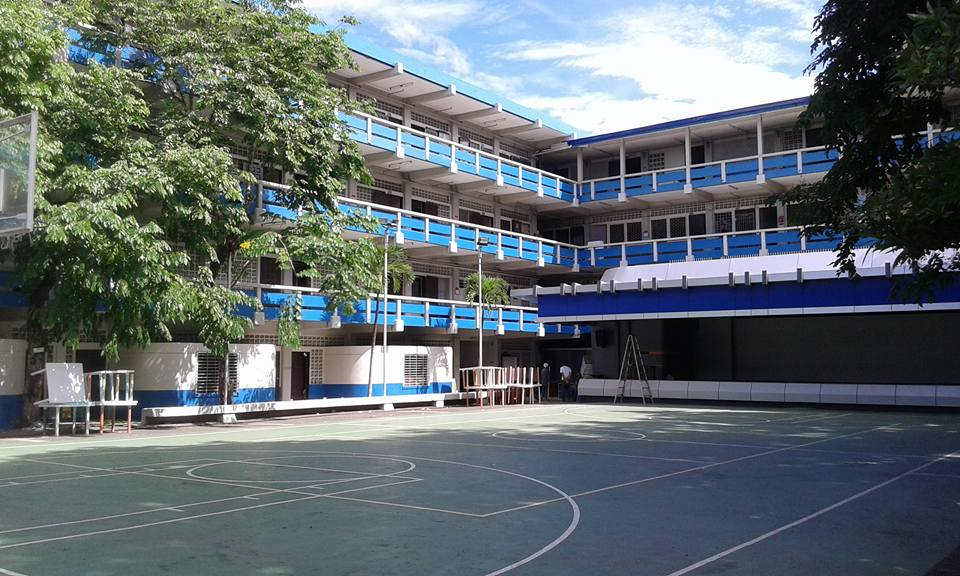
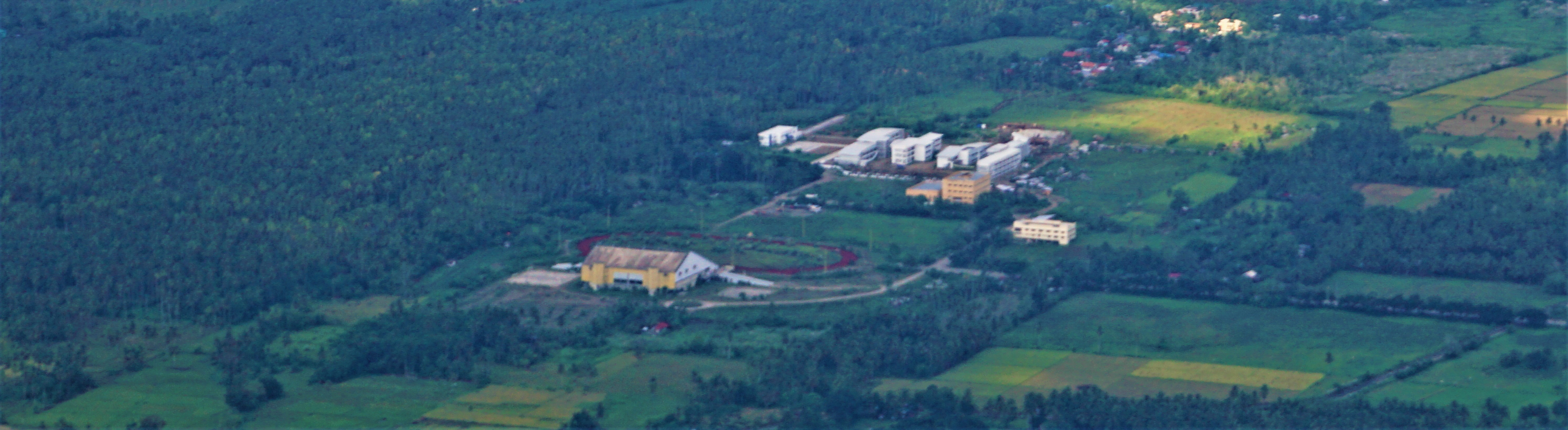
- Macapagal Bridge and Agusan River Guingona Park SM Butuan City Hall FSUU Main Campus Butuan Polysports Complex (bottom) and PISAY Caraga (top)

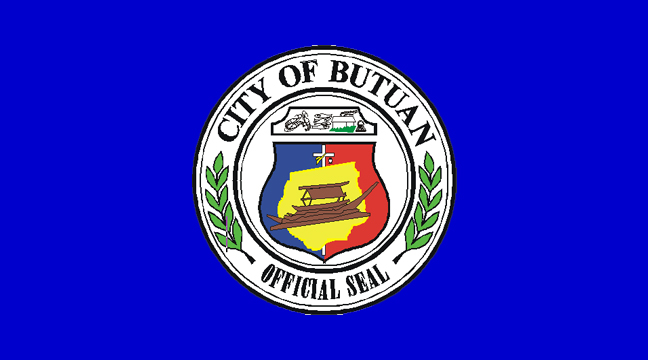
- Flag Seal
- Nicknames: Home of the Balangays; Timber City of the South; BXU
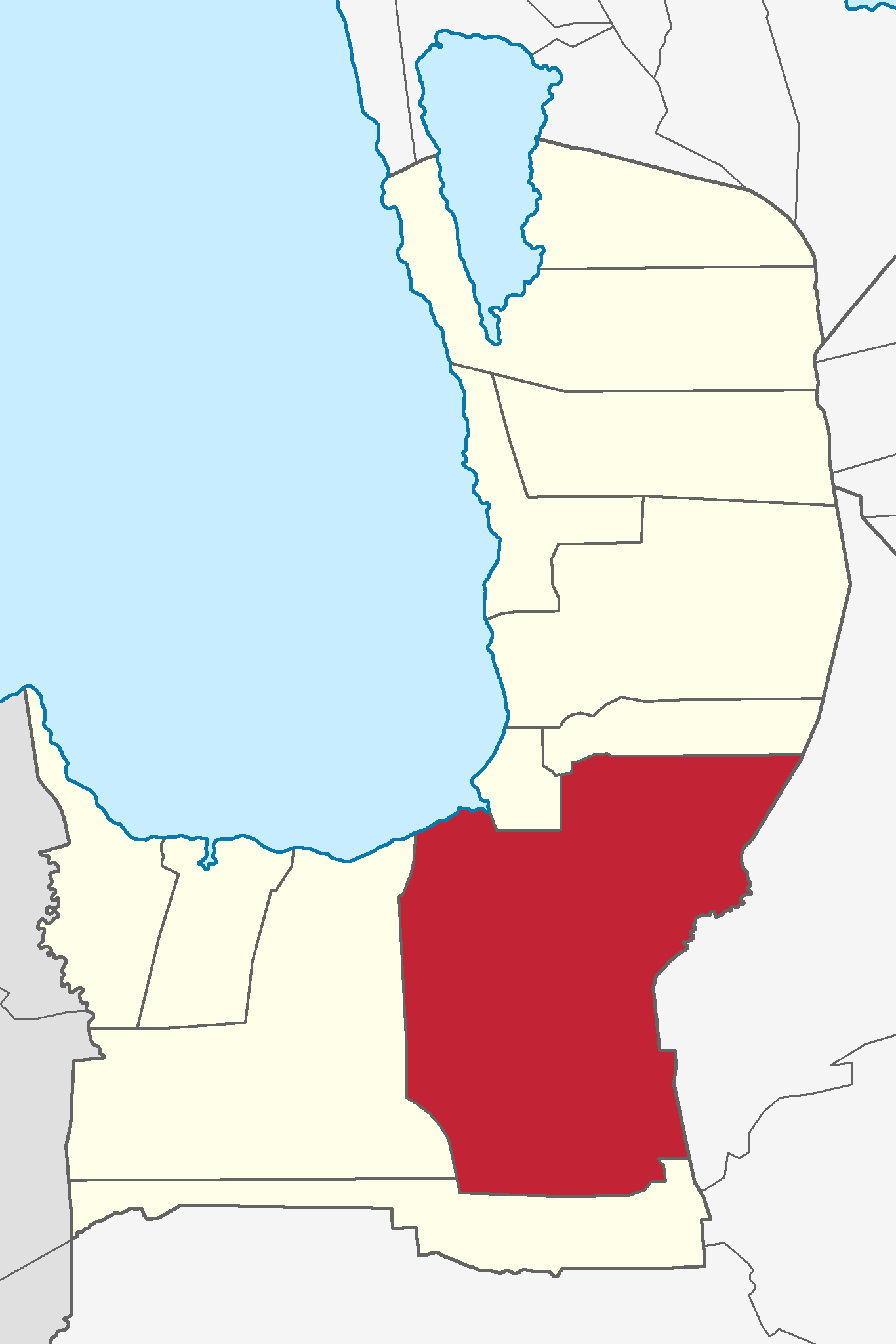
- Map of Agusan del Norte with Butuan highlighted
- Interactive map of Butuan
- Location within the Philippines
- Coordinates: 8°56′53″N 125°32′35″E
- Country: Philippines
- Region: Caraga
- Province: Agusan del Norte (geographically only)
- District: Lone district
- Founded: January 31, 1901
- Cityhood: August 2, 1950
- Highly urbanized city: February 7, 1985
- Barangays: 86 (see barangays)

Government
  - Type: Sangguniang Panlungsod
  - Mayor: Lawrence Lemuel H. Fortun (NP)
  - Vice Mayor: Reynante B. Desiata
  - Representative: Jose Aquino II (Lakas)
  - City Council: Members: Glenn C. Carampatana; Ferdinand E. Nalcot; Derrick A. Plaza; Cromwell P. Nortega; Rema E. Burdeos; Ehrnest John C. Sanchez; John Gil S. Unay Sr.; Joseph Omar O. Andaya; Cherry May G. Busa; Vincent Rizal C. Rosario
  - Electorate: 220,694 voters (2025)

Area
  - Total: 816.62 km^{2} (315.30 sq mi)
- Elevation: 144 m (472 ft)
- Highest elevation: 1,930 m (6,330 ft)
- Lowest elevation: 0 m (0 ft)

Population (2024 census)
  - Total: 385,530
  - Density: 472.10/km^{2} (1,222.7/sq mi)
  - Households: 89,408
- Demonym: Butuanon

Economy
  - Income class: 1st city income class
  - Poverty incidence: 29.1% (2023)
  - Revenue: ₱ 3,334 million (2024)
  - Assets: ₱ 31,373 million (2024)
  - Expenditure: ₱ 2,266 million (2024)
  - Liabilities: ₱ 2,190 million (2024)
  - Gross domestic product: ₱57.370 billion (2022) $1.014 billion (2022)

Service provider
  - Electricity: Agusan del Norte Electric Cooperative (ANECO)
- Time zone: UTC+08:00 (PST)
- ZIP code: 8600
- PSGC: 160202000
- IDD : area code: +63 (0)85
- Native languages: Cebuano; Butuanon; Agusan; Higaonon; Mamanwa; Tagalog
- Website: www.butuan.gov.ph

Butuan City (pronounced /ˌbuːtˈwɑːn/), officially the City of Butuan (Cebuano: Dakbayan sa Butuan; Butuanon: Dakbayan hong Butuan; Filipino: Lungsod ng Butuan), is a highly urbanized city and the regional center of Caraga, Philippines. According to the 2024 census, it has a population of 385,530 people making it the most populous city in Caraga Region.

It is the seat of government of Agusan del Norte, where it is geographically located but administered independently, and served as its capital until 2000, when it was transferred to Cabadbaran under Republic Act 8811. Provincial offices remain in Butuan pending their complete relocation. For statistical and geographical purposes, the Philippine Statistics Authority groups the city with Agusan del Norte, with which it shares the 1st congressional district.

It also served as the former capital of the Rajahnate of Butuan before 1001 until about 1521. The city was known during that time as the best in gold and boat manufacturing in the entire Philippine archipelago, having traded with places as far as Champa, Ming, Srivijaya, Majapahit, and the Bengali coasts. It is located at the northeastern part of the Agusan Valley, Mindanao, sprawling across the Agusan River. It is bounded to the north, west and south by Agusan del Norte, to the east by Agusan del Sur and to the northwest by Butuan Bay.

== Etymology ==
The name "Butuan" is believed to have originated from the sour fruit locally called batuan. Other etymological sources say that it comes from a certain Datu Buntuan, a chieftain who once ruled over areas of the present-day city.

According to Datu Makalipay, Butuan was named after the wife of Datu Balansag who was the tiniente de barangay of the area before.

== History ==
=== Old Butuan ===
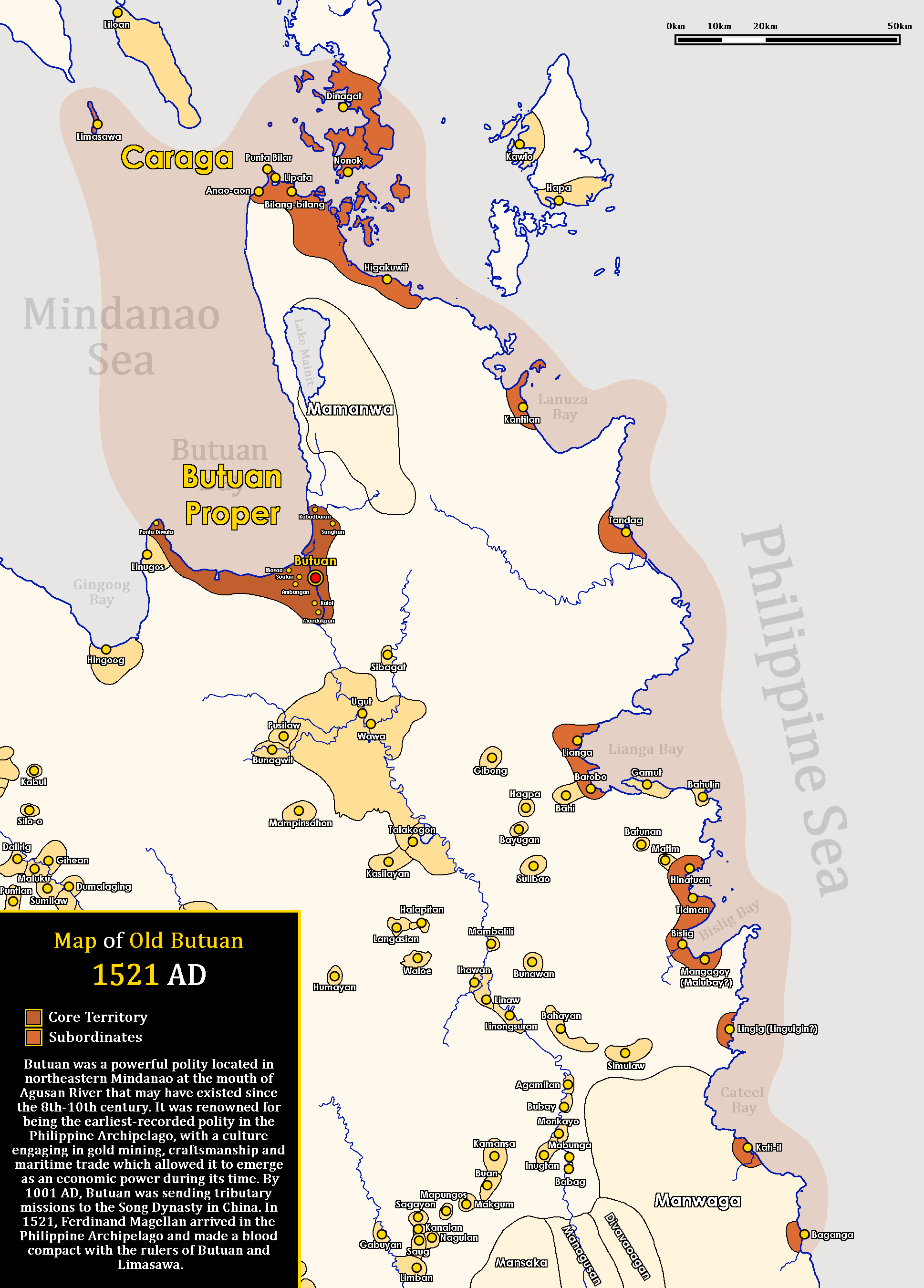
Map of Old Butuan in 1521.

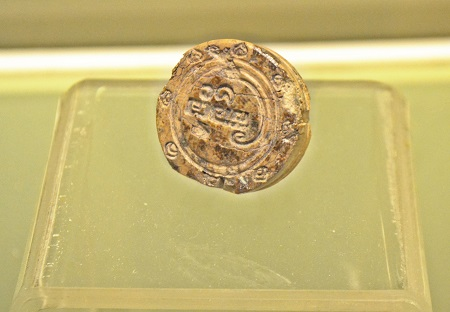
The Butuan Ivory Seal, housed and displayed at the National Museum of the Philippines.

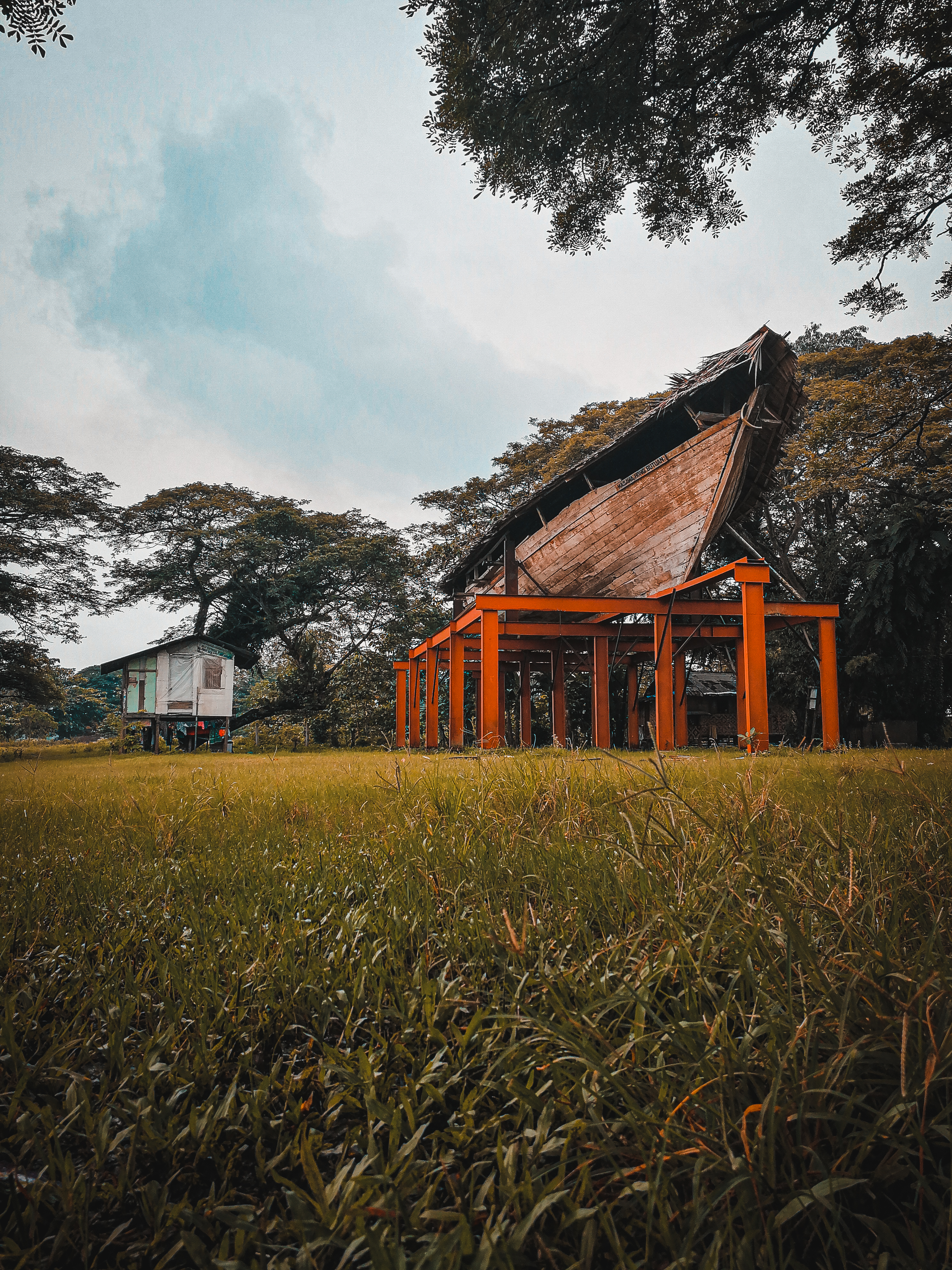
A replica of the balangay displayed in the city.

Butuan, during the pre-colonial times, was a precolonial city-state ruled by a rajah, an Indianized kingdom known for its metallurgic industry and sophisticated naval technology. Butuan flourished at the 10th and 11th centuries CE, and had an extensive trade network with the Champa civilization and the Srivijaya Empire.

By 1001, Butuan had established contact with the Song dynasty of China. The History of Song recorded the appearance of a Butuan mission at the Chinese imperial court, and the rajahnate was described as a small Hindu country with a Buddhist monarchy, which had a regular trade connection with Champa. The mission, under a king named "Kiling", asked for equal status in court protocol with the Champa envoy, but ultimately was denied by the imperial court. However, under the reign of Sri Bata Shaja, the diplomatic equality was eventually granted to the kingdom, and as a result the diplomatic relations of the two nations reached its peak in the Yuan dynasty.

Evidence of these trading links is in the discovery of 11 balangay boats around Ambangan in Barangay Libertad, which was described as the only concentration of archaeological, ancient, ocean-going boats in Southeast Asia. More evidence of the post was the discovery of a village in Libertad that specialized in gold, as well as the discovery of deformed skulls similar to reports in Sulawesi. Other assorted artifacts have also found by locals and treasure hunters.

=== Colonial period ===
On March 31, 1521, an Easter Sunday, Ferdinand Magellan ordered a mass to be celebrated. This was officiated by Friar Pedro Valderrama, the Andalusian chaplain of the fleet, the only priest then. Another priest, the French Bernard Calmette (Bernardo Calmeta) had been marooned at Patagonia with Juan de Cartagena for being implicated in the mutiny at Puerto San Julián. Conducted near the shores of the island, the Holy First Mass marked the birth of Christianity in the Philippines. Rajah Colambu and Siagu were said to be among the first natives of the soon-to-be Spanish colony to attend the mass among other Mazaua inhabitants, together with visitors from Butuan who came with the entourage of Siagu, king of Butuan.

Controversy has been generated regarding the holding of the first mass—whether it was held in Limasawa, Leyte or in Masao, Butuan, in the hidden isle made up of barangays Pinamanculan and Bancasi inside Butuan—in the latest discovered site in the small barangay of Barobo, situated near between Agusan del Sur and Surigao del Sur, or elsewhere. It is sure, however, that Ferdinand Magellan did not drop anchor by the mouth of Agusan River in 1521 and hold mass to commemorate the event which was held at Mazaua, an island separate from Butuan which, in the geographical conception of Europeans who wrote about it, was a larger entity than what it is now. Antonio Pigafetta who wrote an eyewitness account of Magellan's voyage described in text and in map a Butuan that stretched from today's Surigao up to the top edge of Zamboanga del Norte.

Upon contact, Butuan was then incorporated by the Spanish into the Caraga Region. In 1635, Caraga was fortified by 45 additional Spanish soldiers and household heads from Mexico, in 1670 a further 81 soldiers, and in 1672 still another 81. By the end of the 1700s, Caraga had 3,497 native families, protected by a company of (100) Mexican soldiers. Afterwards the census of 1818 shows Butuan had 3,703 native families and 10 Spanish-Filipino families from Spain (Excluding the native identifying Mexicans who arrived earlier and had already assimilated)

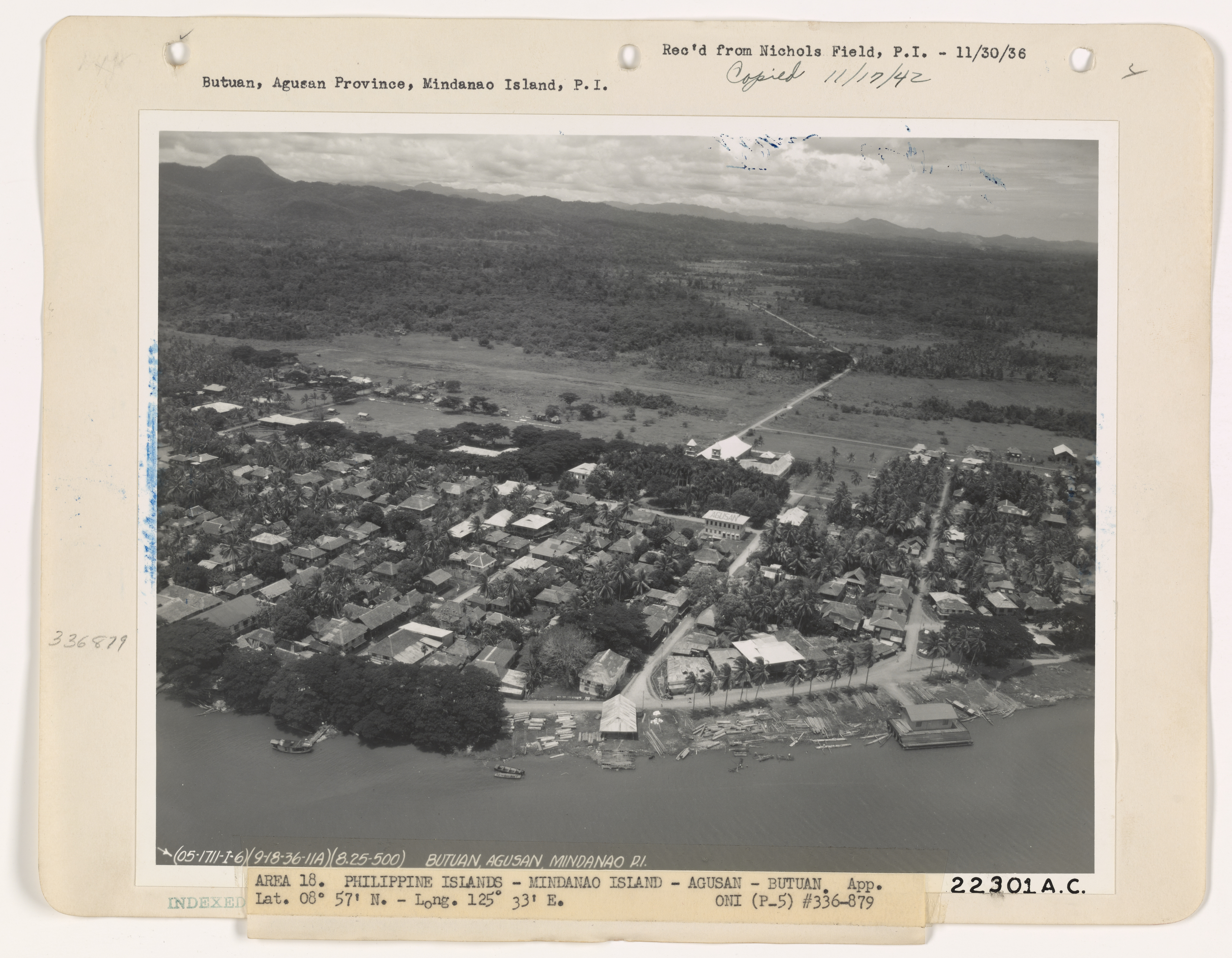
Aerial view of Butuan, 1936

The first municipal election in Butuan took place in March 1902 in accordance with Public Law No. 82 which coincided with the American occupation of the place.

During the Japanese occupation of the Philippines in World War II, the Japanese enslaved local girls, teenagers, and young adults into becoming "comfort women", who they routinely gang-raped and murdered in "comfort stations" that they established in the city in 1942. More than half of Butuan, if not all of it, was burned when local guerrilla forces attacked the enemy garrison on March 12, 1943, in the Battle of Butuan. On January 17, 1945, guerrillas attacked Japanese troops on the road between Cabadbaran and Butuan to prevent the Japanese garrison at Butuan from being reinforced. When the guerrillas depleted their ammunition supply, they were forced to retreat. Later in 1945, the Philippine Commonwealth troops in Butuan together with the recognized guerrillas attacked the Japanese forces during the Battle of Agusan. On October 20, 1948, still recovering from the war, the entire municipality was ruined by a fire.

=== Third Republic and Marcos dictatorship ===
By the late 1940s to the 1970s, Butuan's industry specialized in timber, earning it the nickname "Timber City of the South". The plentiful trees of the area invited many investors and migrants from Luzon and Visayas to the city, and inspired then Congressman Marcos M. Calo to file a bill elevating Butuan for cityhood. On August 2, 1950, this was passed, converting Butuan into a city.

However, by the early 1980s, the logging industry of the city began to decline, although the city was still an economic haven for many investors. The city's main income by that time frame and until this day depended on small and medium business, and large-scale projects by investors. On February 7, 1985, the city was reclassified from a chartered city to a highly urbanized city.

In the aftermath of the People Power Revolution in February 1986 that ousted President Ferdinand Marcos from power, Figurado Plaza's 14-year tenure as mayor ended upon being replaced by Guillermo Sanchez amidst a nationwide replacement of incumbent mayors with officers in charge. Plaza's removal was due to his membership under Marcos' Kilusang Bagong Lipunan (KBL) party; his older brother Democrito Plaza was also a known ally of Marcos during the latter's dictatorship.

=== Fifth Republic ===
In May 1987, Figurado Plaza's 29-year-old wife Charito B. Plaza ran for representative of Agusan del Norte's 1st district under the UNIDO coalition and won against 18 other candidates. She eventually served three consecutive terms in office from 1987 to 1998.

On the morning of March 10, 1988, the frustrated murder hearing of Pablo Macapas at the Capitol Building in Butuan had just adjourned when Macapas fatally shot his accuser, former Nasipit mayor Mariano Corvera Sr., multiple times in the courtroom. In the aftermath of the assassination, murder charges were filed against Macapas and his counsel, Carmen Mayor Tranquilino O. Calo Jr. (to whom Macapas was alleged to have been his bodyguard), driver Bellarmino Allocod, and two others. Although investigating fiscal Macario Balansag determined there was prima facie evidence of murder against the respondents on June 22, he was later assassinated as well on August 19, 1988 on his way to the office. While Macapas was never caught, Mayor Calo and Allocod were later found guilty of murder by an RTC in March 1990, but pending his appeal before the Supreme Court, Calo died of myocardial infarction in February 1993, while the court later reversed Allocod's conviction by 1996 due to the prosecution's failure to prove his guilt beyond reasonable doubt.

On the morning of October 4, 1990, Butuan and Cagayan de Oro became the sites of a separatist rebellion in Northern Mindanao led by dissident army officers Alexander Noble and Agapito Carbeno, the latter of whom led 200 army soldiers in taking over the 402nd Infantry Brigade headquarters in Bancasi, Butuan. Two days later, the rebellion ended upon Noble's surrender to former Cagayan de Oro mayor Aquilino Pimentel Jr.

On February 23, 1995 the region of Caraga was created by virtue of Republic Act 7901, with Butuan as its regional center, and the provincial capital of Agusan del Norte. In 2000, Republic Act 8811 formally transferred the capital of Agusan del Norte from Butuan to Cabadbaran; however most provincial offices are still located in the city.

In 2021, Timber City Academy, a school in Butuan, was ravaged by a fire.

In the summer of 2023, the Agusan Capitol was rocked by a bomb threat, which prevented the governor from entering the city due to threats of a rebel presence, according to some reports. Later on December of that year, the city was ravaged by a 7.6 magnitude earthquake, which damaged many parts of the city's buildings, such as SM City Butuan, as well as schools and major bridges.

== Geography ==
According to the Philippine Statistics Authority, the City of Butuan has a total land area of 81,662 hectares (201,790 acres), which is roughly 4.1% of the total area of the Caraga region.

Butuan is bordered by the municipalities of Magallanes, Agusan del Norte and Remedios T. Romualdez to the north, municipality of Sibagat, Agusan del Sur to the northeast, east and southeast, municipality of Las Nieves, Agusan del Norte to the south, municipality of Buenavista, Agusan del Norte to the west and Butuan Bay to the northwest.

Butuan is 29 kilometres (18 mi) away from the city of Cabadbaran, the provincial capital of Agusan del Norte, to the north. It is also 43 kilometres (27 mi) away from Bayugan to the east and 75 kilometres (47 mi) away from Gingoog to the west.

=== Elevation ===
Butuan is located at 8°56′53″N 125°32′35″E. Elevation at these coordinates is estimated at 1.0 meter above sea level (M.a.s.l.).

=== Land Use ===
The existing land use of the city consists of the following uses: agriculture areas (397.23 km^{2}), forestland (268 km^{2}), grass/shrub/pasture land (61.14 km^{2}) and other uses (90.242 km^{2}). Of the total forestland, 105 km^{2} is production forest areas while 167.5 km^{2} is protection forest areas.

The forestland consists of both production and protection forests. Classified forest areas are further divided into these two categories based on their use and function. Production forests are primarily utilized for the cultivation of industrial tree species, while protection forests are conserved to maintain ecological balance and support essential environmental functions. These protection areas include key watersheds, such as those in Taguibo, which serve as the primary source of water for the locality.

The city is endowed with swamplands near its coastal area. These swamp areas are interconnected with the waterways joined by the Agusan River. Most of the swamplands are actually mangroves that served as habitat to different marine species.

Filling material needs of the city are extracted usually from the riverbank of Taguibo River. Others are sourced out from promontories with special features and for special purpose.

The fishing ground of Butuan is Butuan Bay of which two coastal barangays are located. It extends some two kilometers to the sea and joins the Bohol Sea. These are the barangays of Lumbocan and Masao.

=== Climate ===
Butuan has a tropical rainforest climate (Köppen climate classification Af).

Climate data for Butuan, Agusan del Norte (1991–2020, extremes 1980–present)
Month	Jan	Feb	Mar	Apr	May	Jun	Jul	Aug	Sep	Oct	Nov	Dec	Year
Record high °C (°F)	35.4 (95.7)	35.3 (95.5)	35.8 (96.4)	37.8 (100.0)	38.0 (100.4)	37.6 (99.7)	37.7 (99.9)	36.1 (97.0)	37.2 (99.0)	36.3 (97.3)	36.2 (97.2)	35.6 (96.1)	38.0 (100.4)
Mean daily maximum °C (°F)	30.2 (86.4)	30.8 (87.4)	31.8 (89.2)	33.0 (91.4)	33.7 (92.7)	33.2 (91.8)	32.7 (90.9)	32.9 (91.2)	32.9 (91.2)	32.6 (90.7)	31.7 (89.1)	31.1 (88.0)	32.2 (90.0)
Daily mean °C (°F)	26.6 (79.9)	26.9 (80.4)	27.6 (81.7)	28.5 (83.3)	29.2 (84.6)	28.9 (84.0)	28.5 (83.3)	28.6 (83.5)	28.6 (83.5)	28.4 (83.1)	27.8 (82.0)	27.4 (81.3)	28.1 (82.6)
Mean daily minimum °C (°F)	23.0 (73.4)	22.9 (73.2)	23.3 (73.9)	24.0 (75.2)	24.7 (76.5)	24.5 (76.1)	24.3 (75.7)	24.4 (75.9)	24.2 (75.6)	24.2 (75.6)	23.8 (74.8)	23.6 (74.5)	23.9 (75.0)
Record low °C (°F)	18.3 (64.9)	17.5 (63.5)	18.5 (65.3)	20.0 (68.0)	18.0 (64.4)	18.5 (65.3)	17.5 (63.5)	19.0 (66.2)	19.0 (66.2)	20.0 (68.0)	18.5 (65.3)	18.5 (65.3)	17.5 (63.5)
Average rainfall mm (inches)	326.4 (12.85)	234.5 (9.23)	148.9 (5.86)	116.9 (4.60)	111.4 (4.39)	174.3 (6.86)	152.4 (6.00)	114.4 (4.50)	126.5 (4.98)	170.4 (6.71)	197.8 (7.79)	251.8 (9.91)	2,125.7 (83.69)
Average rainy days (≥ 1.0 mm)	18	13	13	10	11	14	13	10	10	13	15	17	157
Average relative humidity (%)	88	85	83	82	82	83	83	82	82	84	86	87	84
Source: PAGASA

=== Barangays and districts ===
Butuan is politically subdivided into 86 barangays. Each barangay consists of puroks while some have sitios.

These barangays are further grouped into 13 districts. Also, barangays 1 thru 26 form the Poblacion (city proper) of Butuan.

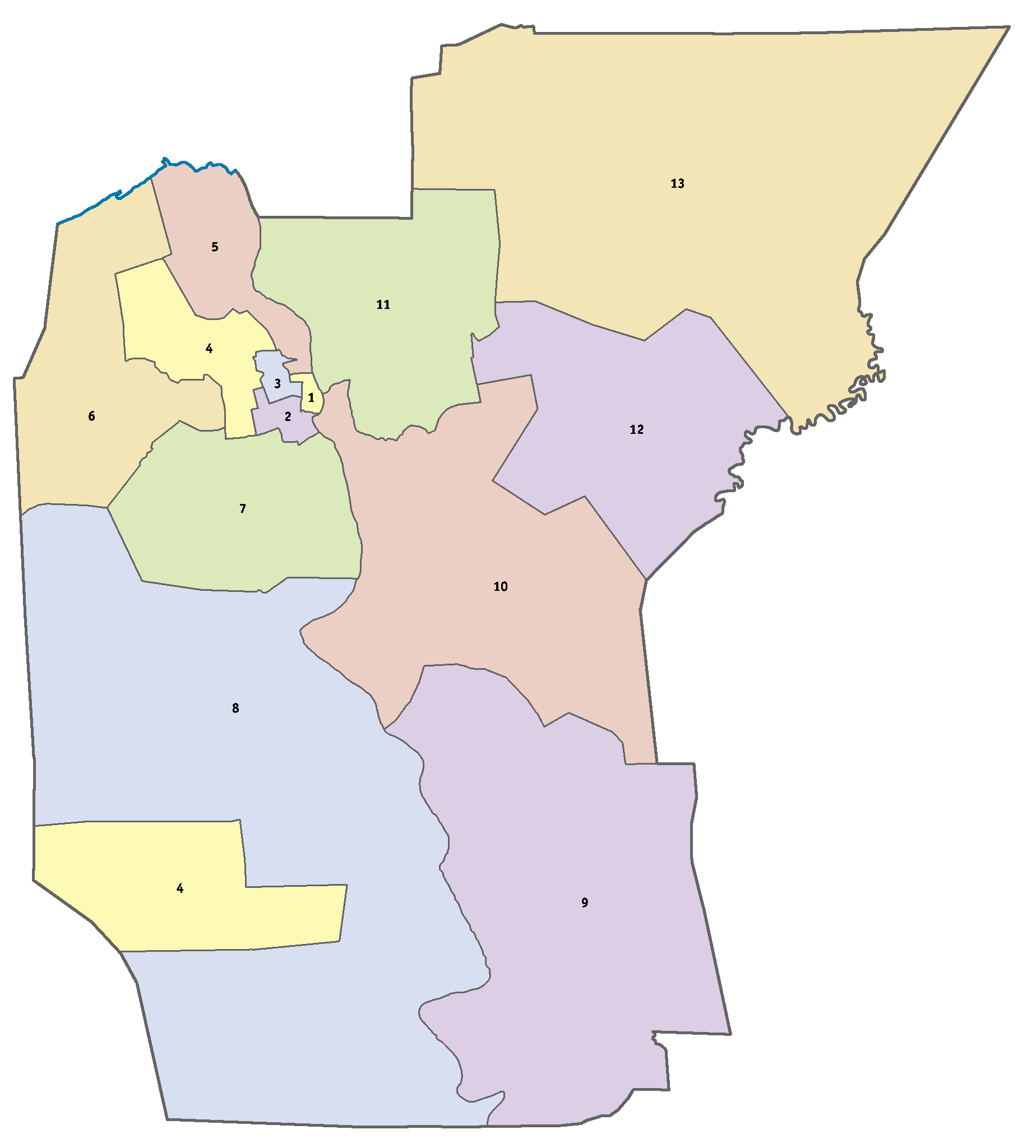
District map of Butuan

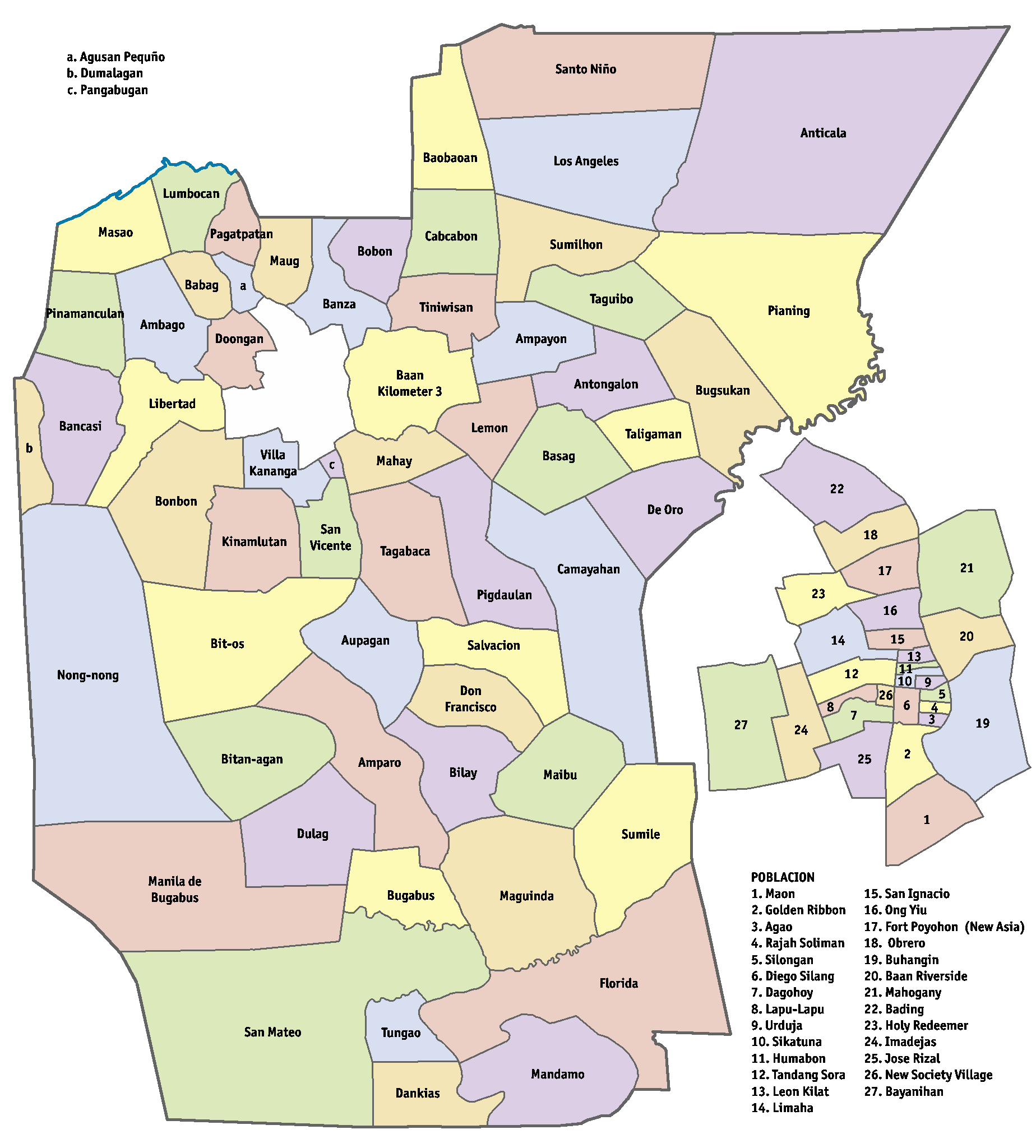
Barangay map of Butuan

District	Barangay	Population (2020)
1st	Agao (Bgy 3); Datu Silongan (Bgy 5); Diego Silang (Bgy 6); Humabon (Bgy 11); Leon Kilat (Bgy 13); San Ignacio (Bgy 15); Sikatuna (Bgy 10); Rajah Soliman (Bgy 4); Urduja (Bgy 9)	4,697
2nd	Dagohoy (Bgy 7); Golden Ribbon (Bgy 2); Imadejas (Bgy 24); Jose Rizal (Bgy 25); Lapu-Lapu (Bgy 8); New Society Village (Bgy 26)	15,302
3rd	Holy Redeemer (Bgy 23); Limaha (Bgy 14); Tandang Sora (Bgy 12)	18,316
4th	Ambago; Bayanihan (Bgy 27); Doongan; Manila de Bugabus	36,837
5th	Agusan Pequeño; Babag; Bading (Bgy 22); Fort Poyohon (New Asia) (Bgy 17); Lumbocan; Obrero (Bgy 18); Ong Yiu (Bgy 16); Pagatpatan	45,154
6th	Bancasi; Dumalagan; Libertad; Masao; Pinamanculan	38,957
7th	Bonbon; Kinamlutan; Maon (Bgy 1); Pangabugan; San Vicente; Villa Kananga	51,585
8th	Amparo; Bit-os; Bitan-agan; Dankias; Dulag; Bugabus; Nongnong; San Mateo; Tungao	22,608
9th	Bilay; Don Francisco; Florida; Maguinda; Maibu; Mandamo; Sumile	13,842
10th	Aupagan; Buhangin (Bgy 19); Camayahan; Lemon; Mahay; Pigdaulan; Salvacion; Tagabaca	23,342
11th	Baan KM 3; Baan Riverside (Bgy 20); Banza; Bobon; Cabcabon; Mahogany (Bgy 21); Maug; Tiniwisan	42,970
12th	Ampayon; Antongalon; Basag; Bugsukan; De Oro; Taligaman	30,628
13th	Anticala; Baobaoan; Los Angeles; Pianing; Santo Niño; Sumilihon; Taguibo	28,672

== Demographics ==
Population census of Butuan

Year	Pop.	±% p.a.
1903	8,207	—
1918	10,875	+1.89%
1939	18,295	+2.51%
1948	31,628	+6.27%
1960	82,485	+8.31%
1970	131,094	+4.74%

Year	Pop.	±% p.a.
1975	132,682	+0.24%
1980	172,489	+5.39%
1990	227,829	+2.82%
1995	247,074	+1.53%
2000	267,279	+1.70%
2007	298,378	+1.53%

Year	Pop.	±% p.a.
2010	309,709	+1.37%
2015	337,063	+1.62%
2020	372,910	+2.15%
2024	385,530	+0.80%

Source: Philippine Statistics Authority

With a total population of 385,530 in the 2024 census, Butuan has an average density of 460 persons per km^{2}, higher than the regional average density of 130 persons per km^{2}.

=== Ethnicities ===
Butuan has been the home of the eponymous Butuanon people, a Visayan ethnic group, due to its history as the capital of precolonial Butuan Rajahnate. However, migrants from other Visayan regions started to flock to Butuan when the Spaniards arrived, making the local Butuanon population a minority in their own homeland, albeit very prominent demographic. Migrations to Butuan continued into the 20th century when a timber industry thrived there. These waves of migrants (and their native-born descendants) during these periods consist of Bicolanos, Ilocanos, Kapampangans, Pangasinans and Tagalogs from Luzon and Hiligaynons and Warays from the Visayas as well as from other parts of Mindanao, in addition to Cebuanos and native Butuanons, making Butuan a culturally diverse city up to this day.

=== Languages ===
Butuan today is dominated mainly by Cebuano speakers, due to the waves of migrations from Cebu and Bohol over the years, almost overrunning the indigenous Butuanon inhabitants who speak their eponymous language. Filipino/Tagalog, the country's official languages, are used primarily in communication for government publications, local newsprints, road signs, commercial signs and in doing official business transactions, with the latter, considered the national language is used as verbal communication channel among residents especially recent migrants from Luzon.

=== Religion ===
The dominant religion in the city is Roman Catholic Christianity with Saint Joseph is its patron saint. It is also the seat of the Diocese of Butuan, a suffragan of the Archdiocese of Cagayan de Oro. However, other Christian sectors are also present in Butuan such as Iglesia ni Cristo, Members Church of God International, United Methodist Church, Pentecostal Missionary Church of Christ (4th Watch), Jesus is Lord Church, Christ the Rock Church and the Church of Jesus Christ of Latter-day Saints. Being a city full of different cultures, such as Indians and Muslims, several religious groups have also opened their places of worship to the public, such as the Islamic mosques and the now-defunct Gurudwara Shri Guru Ram Das Ji Temple.

== Economy ==
Poverty incidence of Butuan (%)

Source: Philippine Statistics Authority

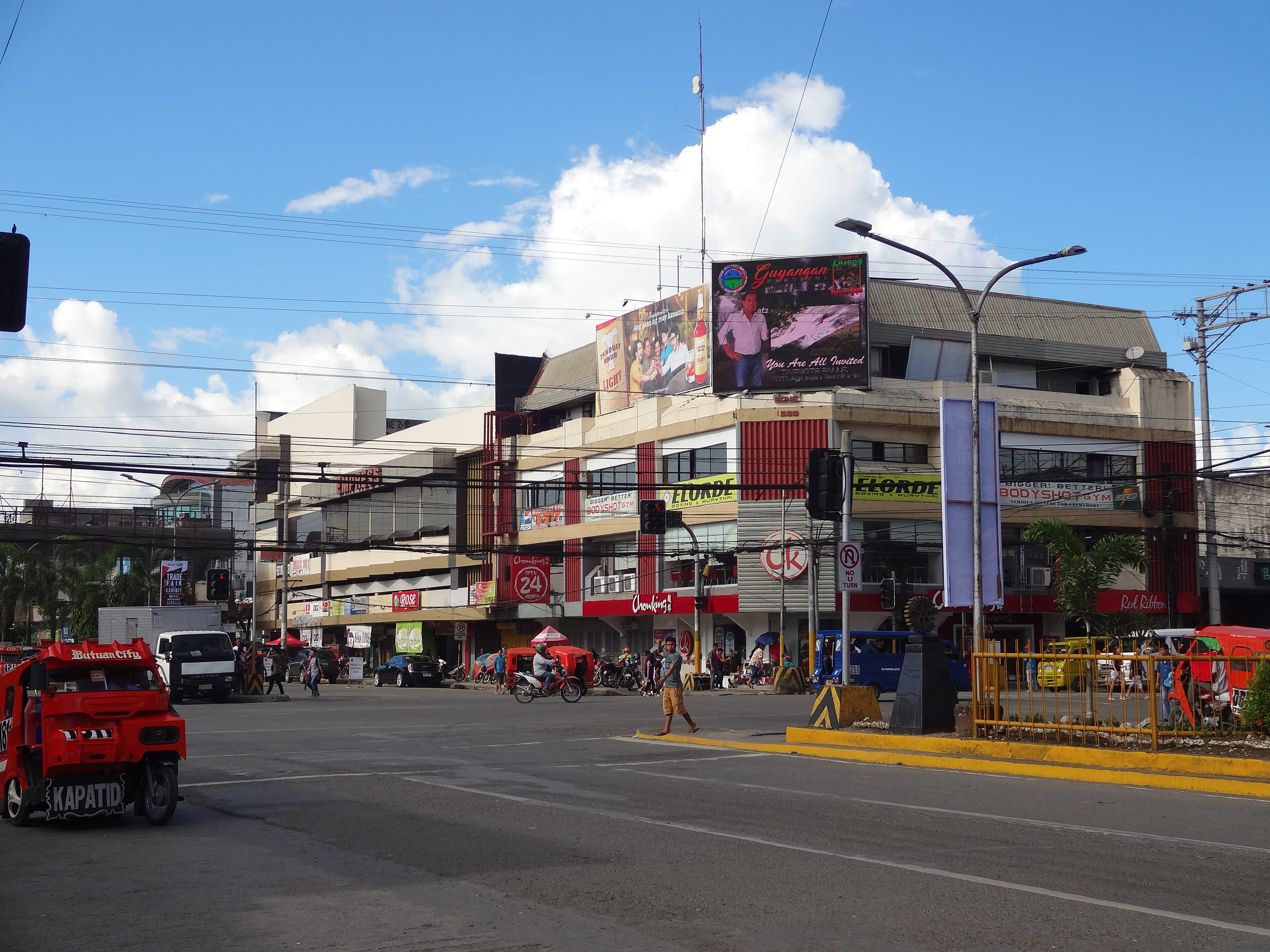
Downtown Butuan

Butuan is the commercial, industrial, and administrative center of the Caraga region. It is a strategic trading hub in Northern Mindanao with major roads connecting it to other main cities on the island such as Davao, Cagayan de Oro, Malaybalay, Surigao, and soon, Tandag. It hosts one of the busiest airports in the country, the Bancasi Airport, serving around 525,000 passengers in 2012. Cebu Pacific and Philippine Airlines serve the airport. Meanwhile, the nearby Nasipit International Port and in-city Masao Port provide for its shipping and cargo needs.

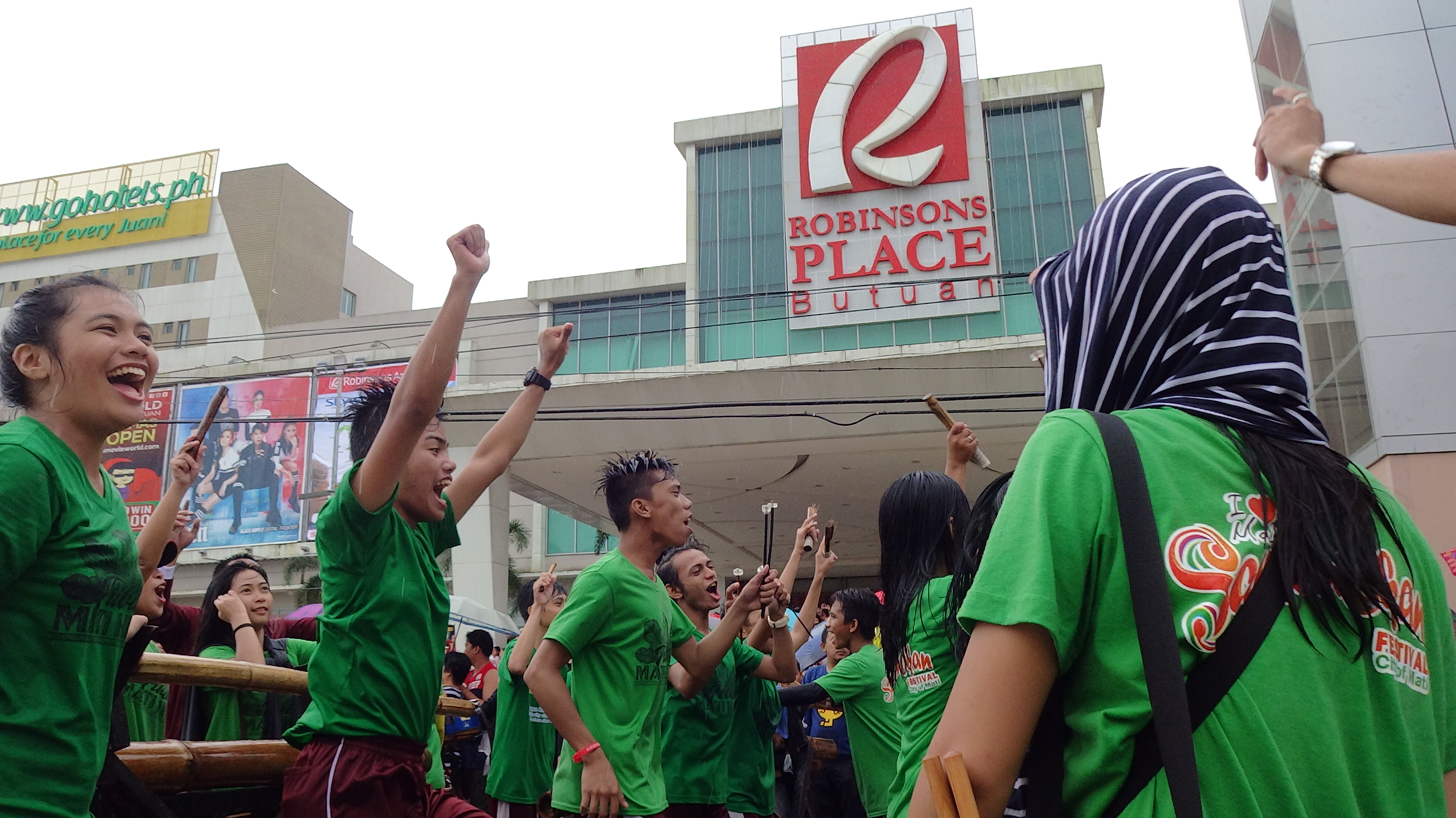
Robinsons Butuan

The total number of businesses registered in 2013 was 9,619—reflecting a growth of 9.86% and almost 3 times that of the next major Caraga city. New businesses registered numbered 2,032 with a combined capitalization of P504,598,667, an expansion of 75.63% from 2012.

As further proof of its dynamic economy, Butuan's local income reached P330,510,000 in 2013 besting other major cities in the country. By 2014, its local income is expected to reach P513,870,000.00 or register a growth of 55%; and total income (including IRA) will be P1,515,970,000. The city was ranked 4th and 16th Most Competitive City for the years 2012 and 2014 by the National Competitiveness Council of the Philippines.

More than 260 financial institutions are operating in the city such as Metrobank, Banco de Oro, Bank of the Philippine Islands (BPI), Land Bank of the Philippines (Landbank, formerly UCPB since 2022), Philippine National Bank (PNB), Chinabank, EastWest Bank, Rizal Commercial Banking Corporation (RCBC), UnionBank, Security Bank and Maybank. Rural banks are also expanding aggressively. Based on a report from PDIC (as of December 2013), total savings deposit in Butuan amounted to P18,944,854,000, comprising 45% of the total deposits in Caraga Region. The Bangko Sentral ng Pilipinas (BSP) opened its regional office here to take advantage of the vibrant gold trading industry in the region. Insurance companies, led by Philam Life, are also present in the city.

The city’s primary agricultural products include rice, bananas, coconuts, poultry, shrimp, and milkfish. Its key industries encompass rice milling, food processing, wood processing, furniture production, fuel distribution, shipbuilding, and construction. The manufacturing sector is expected to expand with the ongoing development of an industrial park. In addition, Butuan has emerged as a hub for renewable energy, attracting investments in solar and hydroelectric power generation.

Smart Communications, Globe Telecom, PLDT and Bayantel serve the telecommunications needs of the city.

== Culture ==
=== Festivities and annual celebrations ===
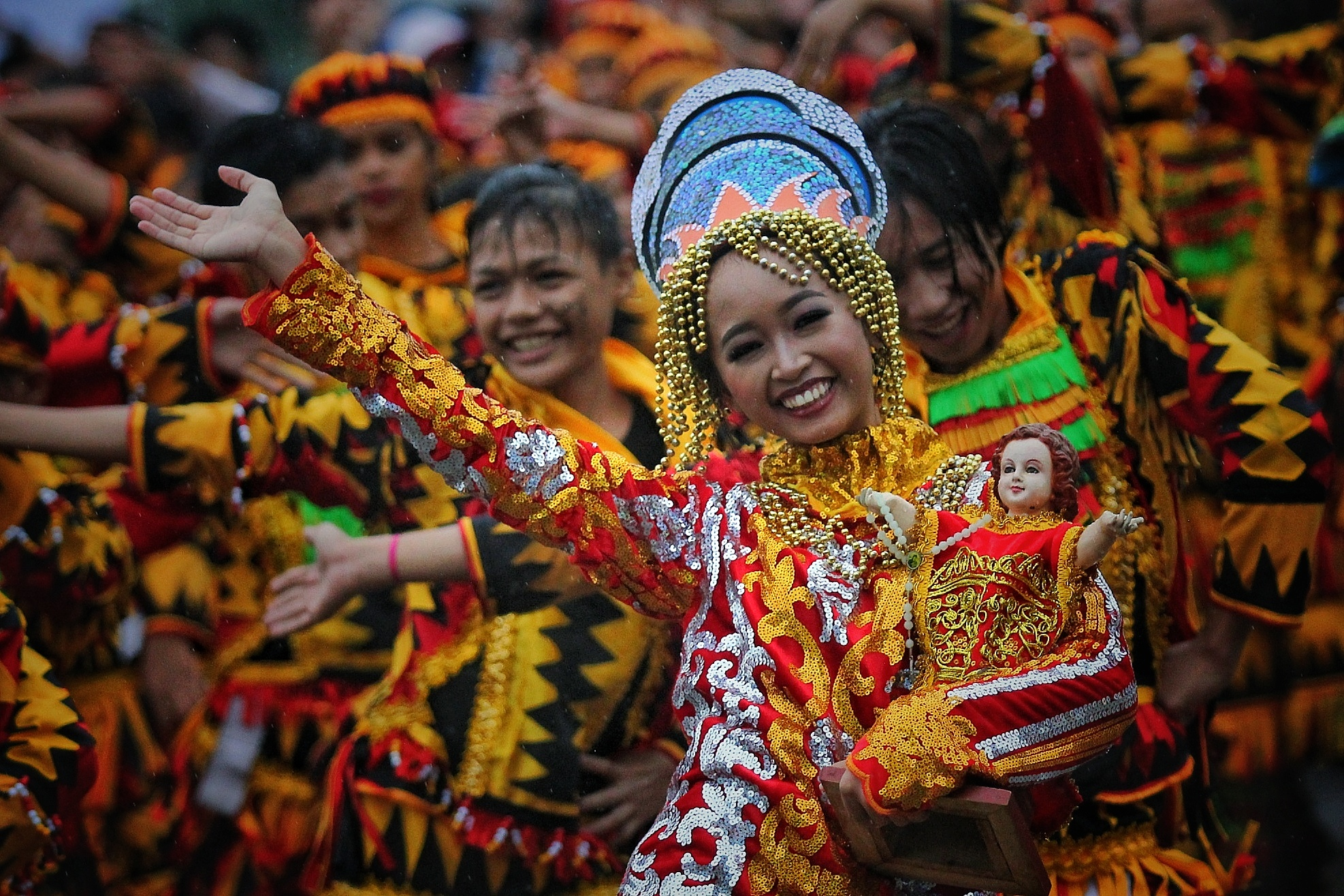
Festival Queen during Kahimunan Festival

Kahimunan Festival
The Kahimunan Festival is celebrated every third Sunday of January in celebration of the city patron Sr. Santo Niño. This celebration is a Butuanon version of Sinulog of Cebu City. Kahimunan is a Lumad term which means "gathering".

Balangay/Balanghai Festival
Butuan celebrates its annual fiesta, the Balangay Festival, for the celebration of the city patron Saint Joseph every whole month of May, with the exact feast day of St. Joseph on May 19. The city holds many events such as summer league basketball championship games, thanksgiving mass, and more.

Butwaan Festival
The newest festival is a feast day celebration of St. Joseph, patron of Butuan, which is held every May 19. This was created last 2013 as replacement to Balangay Festival during the specific date. Both festivals will still celebrates the feast of St. Joseph with Butwaan focus on the Church activities while Balangay will focus on the city government activities.

Cultural Festivals
The Cultural festival/tourism consciousness is a week-long celebration that lasts from the last week of July up to August 2 in celebration of the Charter Day of Butuan.
- Abayan Festival: The Abayan Festival, a part of the Cultural Festival, is held in celebration of St. Anne, patroness of Agusan River, which is celebrated every last Sunday of July.
- Palagsing Festival: "Palagsing" is a local delicacy popularly made in Banza, one of the old poblacion of Butuan. The popularity of making Palagsing in Banza is attributed to the abundance of Lumbiya (Metroxylon sagu Rottb.) where Unaw or lumbiya starch is harvested from the palm tree. Another popular ingredient is young coconut meat. The mixture of unaw, young coconut and brown sugar make palagsing moist and chewy. They are delicately wrapped by banana leaves and are boiled for 30 minutes to create the soft consistency of palagsing. The Palagsing Festival usually held on Adlaw Hong Butuan Celebration every 2nd day of August.
- Adlaw Hong Butuan: Adlaw Hong Butuan is the charter day celebration of Butuan, which includes a thanksgiving mass, motorcade, palagsing festival, street party recognitions of outstanding Butuanons and City Government Employees' Night.

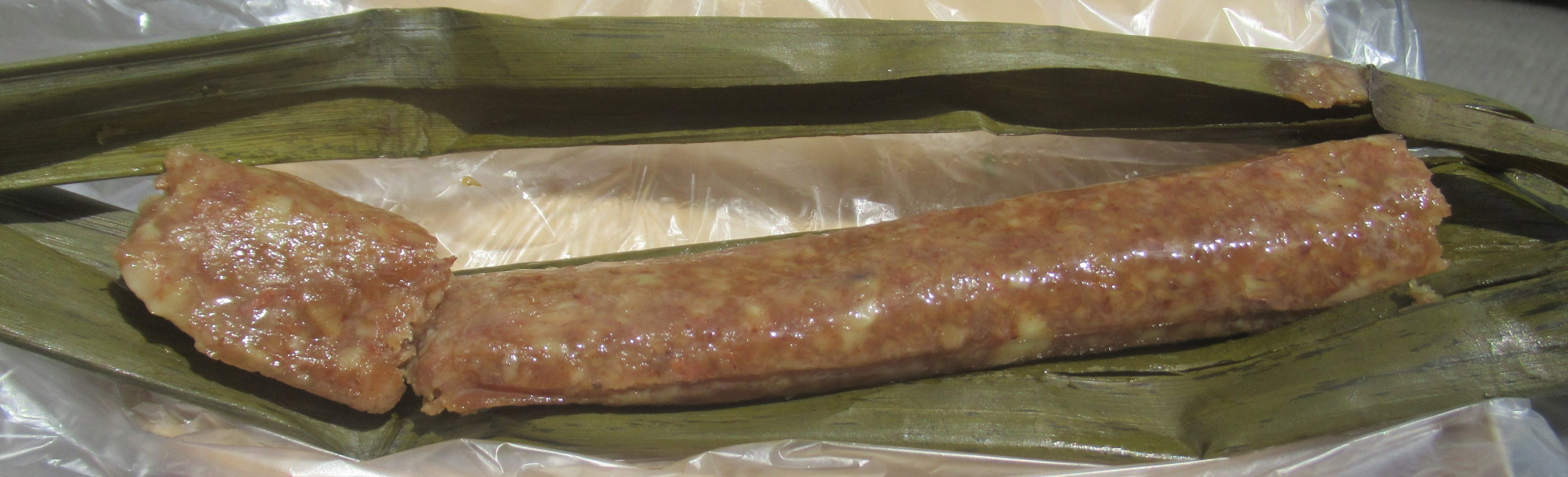
Palagsing

- Unaw Festival: Unaw Festival is a celebration of the abundance of Lumbia starch or Unaw from the Lumbia tree that has been used as a source of food during World War II and it was usually found in Brgy. Baan km 3 and its neighbouring barangays. The Unaw Festival usually held every 27th day of June joining the fiesta celebration of Mother of Perpetual Help in Baan km 3.
- Nilubid Festival and other festivals: The Nilubid Festival is a celebration of the Filipino Rural Culture and heritage. The term "nilubid" is coined from a local delicacy, twisted hard fried flour, which is famous among people of the city and neighboring towns and provinces. The festival highlights the Filipino Folk Dance competition that is dedicated to the miraculous image of the Virgin Mary, Nuestra Señora Sagrada Corazon de Hesus (Our Lady of the Sacred Heart of Jesus). The Nilubid Festival is held every last week of May in Barangay Golden Ribbon, culminating the end of the annual Flores de Mayo.

== Tourism ==
Natural landmarks

- Agusan River: The Agusan River is the widest and most navigable river in Mindanao. Natives who live on the banks of this river pay tribute to their patroness, Senora Santa Ana (Saint Anne) every last Sunday of July in the Abayan festival.
- Mount Mayapay: It rises to 2,214 feet (675 m) above sea level. Mount Mayapay got its name from the ancient Madjapahit Empire. The history behind the Srivijaya period bears much meaning and influence of Butuan's pre-historic and archaeological discoveries.

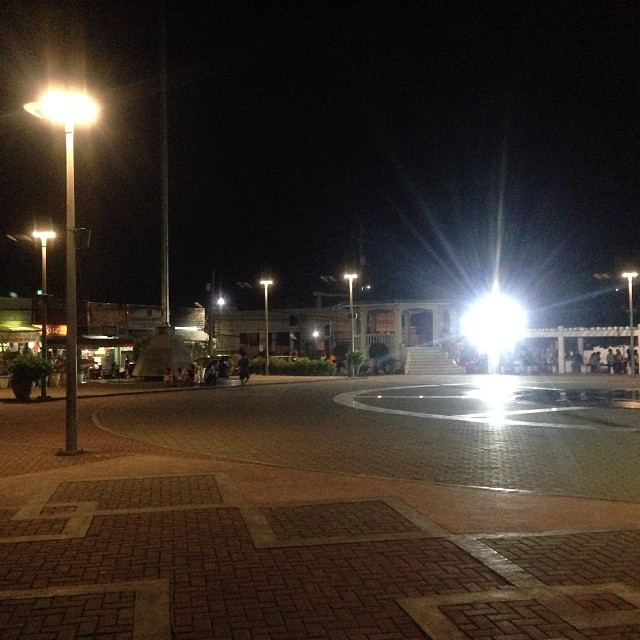
Guingona Park

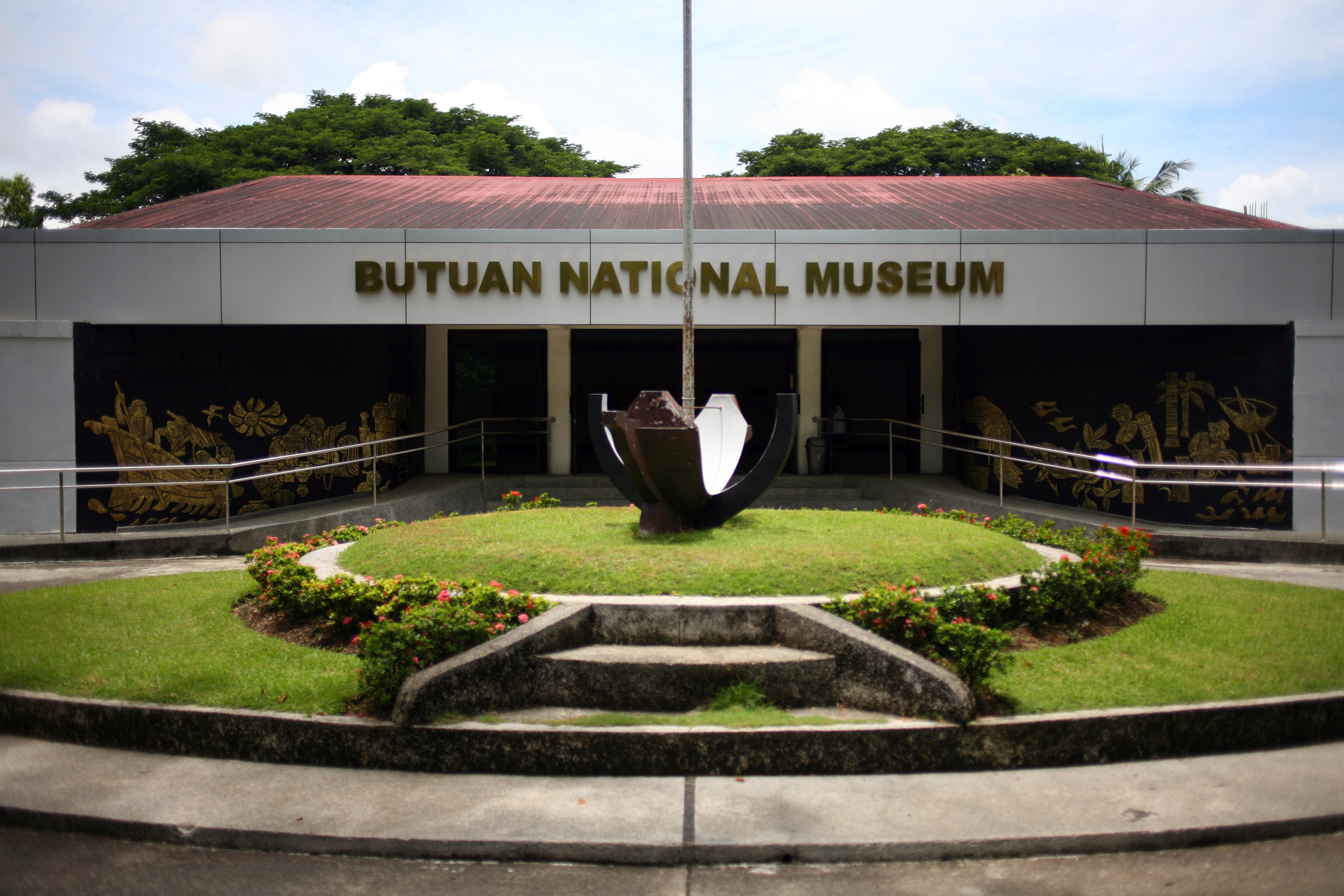
The Butuan National Museum

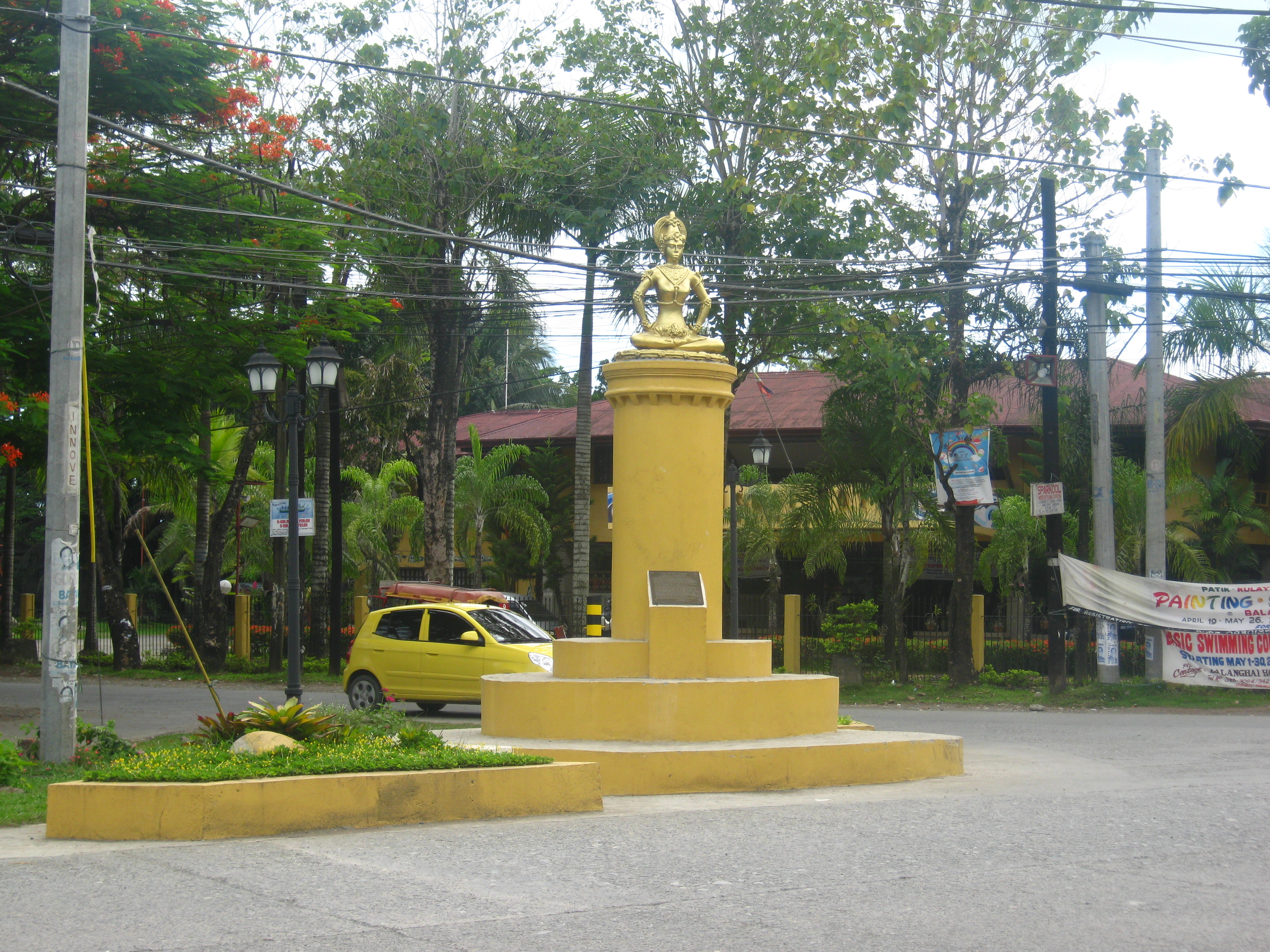
Replica statue of the Golden Tara

Man-made landmarks

- Ramon Magsaysay Bridge: The old Magsaysay Bridge in Butuan, an arched-type steel bridge built during the early sixties spans the Agusan River. For years this bridge serve as a lone vital conduit of the city to the rest of Mindanao island until its new more modern pair came at the city's southern side. The bridge links the main urban center to eastern suburbs of Baan and Ampayon.
- Balangay Boats: The Balangays (or Balanghai) are ancient boats that were found in Butuan. They were excavated in the Balangay Shrine, across the Masao River from Bood Promontory. They played a major role in Butuan because Butuan was, and still is, a port city. Since its discovery, the Balangays have become an icon of Butuan. The Kaya ng Pinoy, Inc. recreated the Balangay boats and have sailed it as part of their project, the Balangay Voyage. So far they have only sailed around Southeast Asia. They are planning to sail around the world.
- Balangay Shrine Museum: The Balangay Shrine Museum, located in Barangay Libertad, lays the graveyard of the Balangay 1 dated 320 A.D. or 1688 years old. The Balangay shrine museum is located at Balanghai, Libertad, Butuan. This wooden plank-build and edge-pegged boats measured an average of 15 meters in length and 3 meters wide across the beam. To date, 9 Balangays have already been discovered in Ambangan, Libertad. Three have been excavated and others are still in Site.
- National Museum (Butuan branch): This museum is the repository of historical and cultural materials and artifacts that proves Butuan's prehistoric existence and rich cultural heritage. There are two exhibit galleries. The Archaeological Hall and Ethnological Hall specimens of stone crafts, metal crafts, woodcrafts, potteries, goldsmith, burial coffins, and other archaeological diggings are exhibited. At the Ethnological Hall are exhibits of contemporary cultural materials the Butuanon or every Filipino for matter used for a living.
- Guingona Park: Guingona Park is the native name for that park. Changes of government, however, resulted in a change of name to Rizal Park. It was contended that Rizal went there and that they named the park after him. Recently, the government of Butuan headed by Mayor Amante reconstructed the park and put the name back to Guingona, as it was he who donated the said park some decades past.
- Delta Discovery Park: Delta Discovery Park is a newly opened zip-line in Butuan. Delta Discovery Park is at Barangay Bonbon, Butuan. It is also known as the longest zip-line in Mindanao and in Asia with a length of 1.3 kilometers.
- Bood Promontory Eco Park: This historic hill is believed to have been the site where Magellan and his men celebrated the first Catholic Mass on Philippine soil and erected a cross when he landed in Mazaua on March 31, 1521. The highest elevation nearest the seaside village of present-day Masao, Bood is a wooded area at a bend in the Masao River (El Rio de Butuan), overlooking Butuan Bay and ancient Butuan as well as the serpentine Masao River. Today, the indigenous Hadlayati tree abound, lording over a clonal nursery and tree park, amidst fishponds and archaeological treasures. According to the chronicles of Spanish historian Pigafetta, the event took place in the afternoon of March 31, 1521, after the Easter Mass was celebrated in the morning of the same date. Two Butuanon brother kings attended these Easter ceremonies. Pigafetta also noted the surrounding fields and balanghai boats on the bay that could be seen from the hill. The eco-park was established to provide the people of Butuan and its visitors a place to rekindle the past amidst a relaxing natural setting.

== Government ==
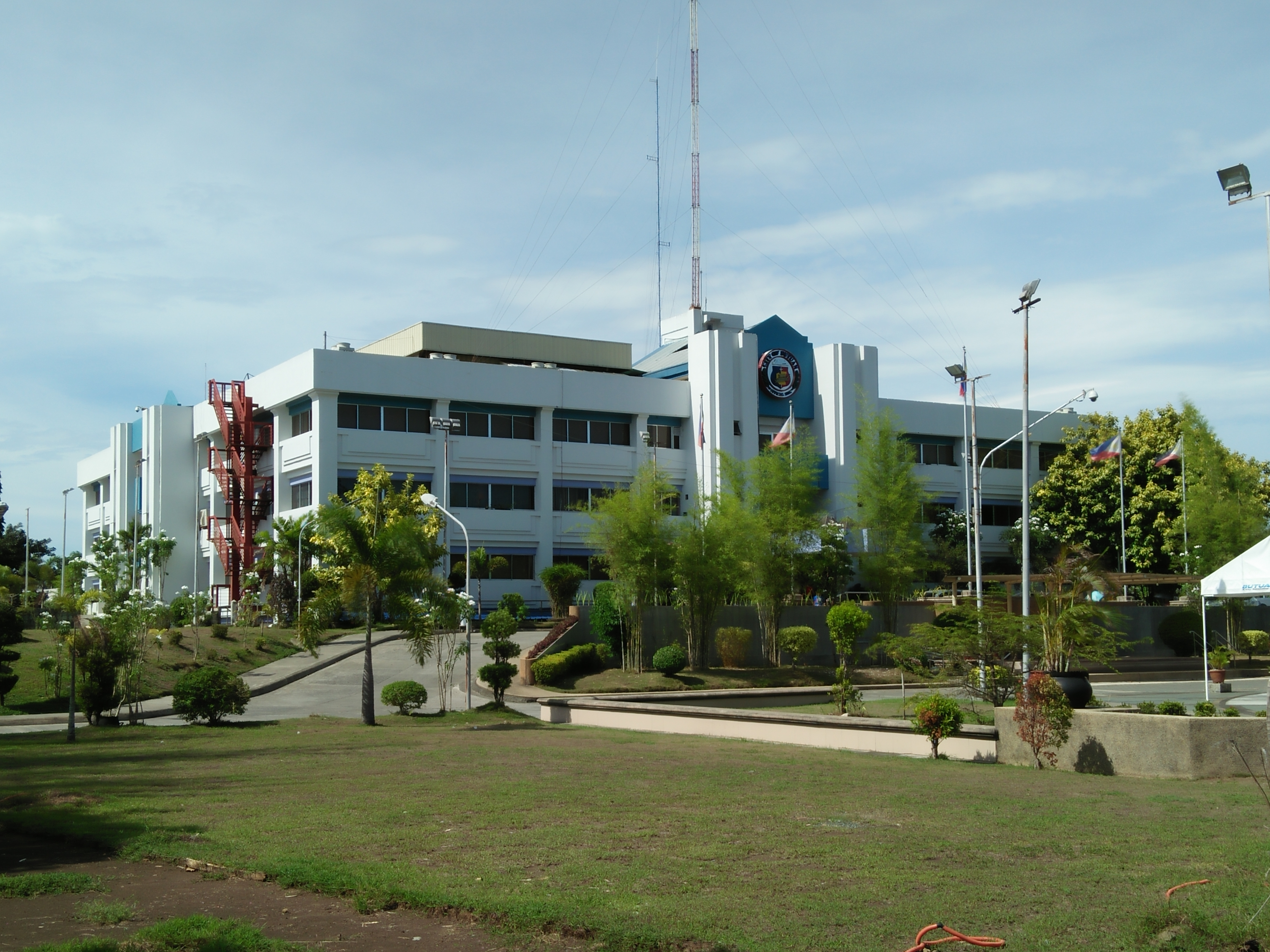
The city hall

The local government of Butuan is headed by an elected Mayor and is considered to be the local chief executive of the city. He exercises the general supervision and control over all programs, projects, services, and activities of the city government. He is then accompanied by the law making body of the city which is called, The Sangguniang Panlungsod headed by the elected Vice Mayor as the presiding officer, together with ten elected Sangguniang Panlungsod Members and the President of the Liga ng mga Barangay as an ex-officio member.

=== Elected officials (2022–2025) ===
==== House of Representatives ====
- Representative: Jose "Joboy" Sabijon Aquino II – currently representative City of Butuan and Municipality of Las Nieves, Agusan del Norte

In May 2025, Butuan City elected a new representative to represent Butuan City only.

==== Executive ====
- Mayor: Atty. Lawrence Lemuel H. Fortun
- Vice Mayor: Hon. Reynante B. Desiata – Presiding Officer of City Council

==== City Council ====
- 16th Sangguniang Panlungsod Members: (As per Election Ranking)
  - Joseph Omar O. Andaya
  - Cromwell P. Nortega
  - Reynante B. Desiata
  - Atty. John Gil Unay, Sr.
  - Cherry May Busa
  - Atty. Ehrnest John C. Sanchez
  - Vincent Rizal C. Rosario – Term not finished, elected for Barangay Chairperson
  - Victor Vicente G. Plaza
  - Dr. Eduardo S. Gonzalez
  - Arturo P. Gado
  - Gemma P. Tabada – Liga ng mga Barangay President
  - Joseph Manuel Morcilla – SK Federation President

==== Barangay Council ====
- Liga ng mga Barangay (ABC) President: Gemma Plaza Tabada (Barangay Baan Km. 3)
- SK Federation President: Joseph Manuel Morcilla (Ampayon)

== Infrastructure ==
=== Transportation ===
==== Air ====
The Butuan National Airport, called Bancasi Airport, serves the general area of Butuan, located in the province of Agusan del Norte in the Philippines. It is the only airport in the province and largest in the Caraga region. The airport is classified as a trunkline airport, or a major commercial airport, by the Air Transportation Office, a body of the Department of Transportation and Communications that is responsible for the operations of not only this airport but also of all other airports in the Philippines except the major international airports. It also serves more than 400,000 travelers yearly that includes 250,000 local and foreign tourists. Butuan National Airport can also accommodate 5 to 10 flights a day including large number of aircraft via Cebu Pacific and Philippine Airlines operated by PAL Express.

==== Sea ====
As a regional commercial and economic hub, the Port of Masao is Butuan's seaport. It was built to avoid having the city depend on the port of Nasipit, Agusan del Norte. The said port will be having more expansion and development to become a seaport with international standards in the region and in Mindanao.

==== Land ====
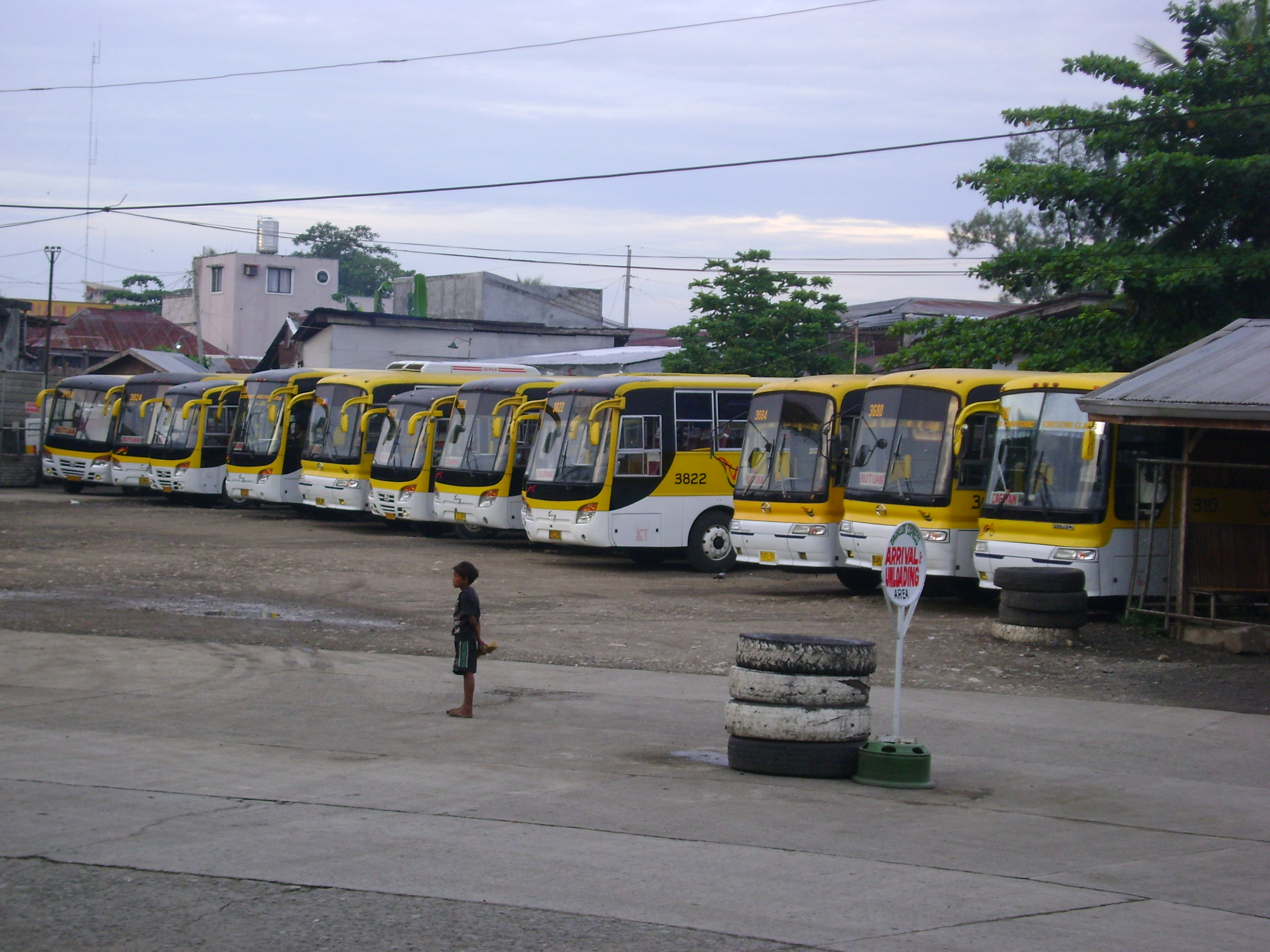
Butuan bus terminal

The main modes of transportation within the city proper are tricycles with 3 distinctive colours. The first and main tricycle is the "orange" tricycle in which it delivers passengers in the majority of Butuan. The second is the "red" tricycle where it delivers passengers in the north, northeast and northwest of Butuan. The third is the "yellow" tricycle where it delivers passengers in the south, southwest and some parts in the southeast and its also the variant with the least amount of tricycles. Depending on the tricycle, it can accommodate up to 6 or 7 passengers. Another mode of transportation is the small-type jeepneys or multicab vehicles with a seating capacity of at least 15 passengers via fixed routes going to big barangays such as Bancasi, Libertad, Ampayon, Los Angeles and De Oro. Jeepneys, Vans and Buses is also available in Jeepney Terminal, New Integrated Van Terminal and City Integrated Bus Terminal respectively located in Langihan Public Area including the state-of-the-art Transport Terminal at the back of the expansion wing of Robinsons Butuan (opened August 2, 2017). They also follow fixed routes to outlying barangays, neighboring towns, municipals, cities and provinces. Long-distance routes also include cities of Manila, Ormoc, Legazpi, Tacloban, Calbayog, Surigao, Tandag, Bislig (Mangagoy), Davao City, Tagum, Cagayan de Oro, Carmen, Balingoan, Gingoog and Malaybalay (not operational). The city also has Metered Taxis and recent addition are grab taxis.

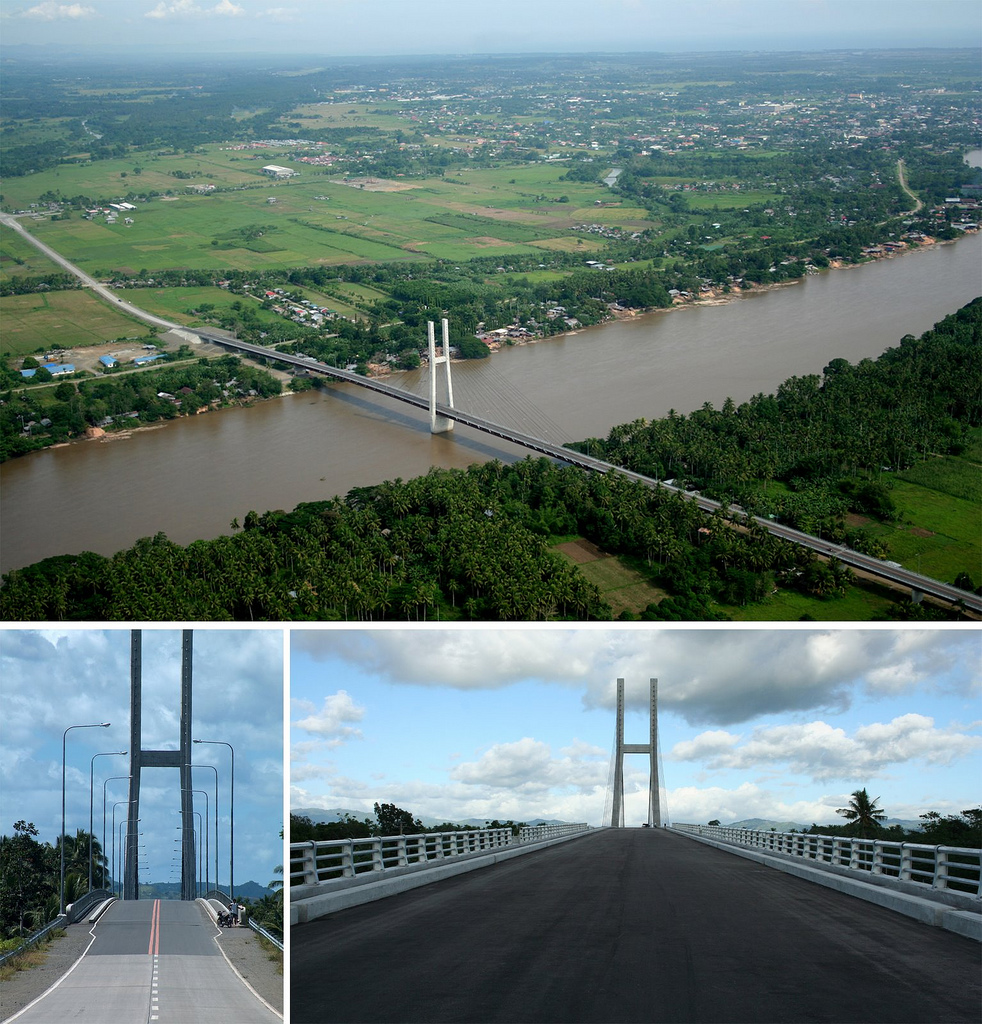
The Macapagal Bridge

- Mayor Democrito O. Plaza II Avenue Circumferential Road and Diosdado Macapagal Bridge: The circumferential is a 14 kilometres (8.7 mi) diversion road from Barangay Bancasi to the southern part of the city proper crossing over the PP2.1 Billion Diosdado Macapagal Bridge to the main highway in Baan Km.3 and in Barangay Antongalon. The Diosdado Macapagal Bridge is the longest bridge in Mindanao, which is 300 metres (980 ft) upstream of the old Magsaysay Bridge and provides an alternate route across the Agusan River to connect the Philippine-Japan Friendship Highway (Surigao-Agusan-Davao road) and the Butuan-Cagayan-Iligan road. The bridge is popular as the only cable stayed bridge with steel deck and single tower in Mindanao, and it has a total length of about 806 metres (2,644 ft).

It was during the presidency of Joseph Estrada that the project was approved which was lobbied by the city government way back President Fidel Ramos' time to decongest the traffic of the more than 50-year-old Magsaysay Bridge and create an alternate route. However, it was President Gloria Macapagal Arroyo who approved and implemented the project. The bridge was funded through a Special Yen Loan Package from Japan Bank for International Cooperation (JBIC). The project was started on May 6, 2004 and completed in May 2007.

- New Circumferential Road and Four New Bridges (Proposed): The new circumferential road consists of 20 kilometres (12 mi) 2-lane road and four new bridges that connects Barangay Sumilihon to Brgy Banza which crosses 2 small rivers (Taguibo and Banza) before crossing to the Third Bridge in Agusan River and connects to Barangay Pagatpatan to Barangay Lumbocan then crosses again in Masao River to reach Barangay Masao and Barangay Pinamanculan before connecting to the National Highway in Barangay Bancasi. The proposed circumferential road will be worth closed to PP2.9 Billion.
- Butuan-Malaybalay Road: The secondary road, known as the Butuan-Malaybalay Road, is scheduled to complete in the future connecting Butuan to Malaybalay via Esperanza, Agusan del Sur but this could be a private transport.
- Masao-Buenavista-Nasipit Coastal Road: The new coastal road (Masao-Buenavista-Nasipit) is scheduled to complete since it started construction in early 2015 until its completion by late 2023 (continued until 2027–2028) consisting of concrete road. It connects Brgy. Masao to the municipality of Nasipit, Agusan del Norte.

Accredited Transport Cooperatives as of January 2021:

- Agusan Norte Transport Service Cooperative (ANTSCO)
- Balangay Transport Service Cooperative (BALTRANSCO)
- Butuan Multicab Operators Transport Service Cooperative
- Cabadbaran Butuan Transport Service Cooperative (CBTRANSCO)
- Caraga Butuan Transport Service Cooperative
- Caraga Transport Service Cooperative
- Diamond Transport Service Cooperative (DATSCO)
- Karagans Transport Service Cooperative

== Sports ==
Butuan Polysports Complex at Tiniwisan in 2025

With new developments surrounding the old unfinished sports complex facility, the City Government has transferred the sports complex from the 8 hectare complex in Barangay Libertad to the 38 hectare complex in Barangay Tiniwisan/Ampayon. The said complex is worth P250 Million for Phase I will be one of the biggest international standard complex in the Philippines. Phase I consists of a 3,672 seater football main bleacher, a 4,000 seater basketball gymnasium, grass football field, and a rubberized track oval. The Phase I of the Polysports Complex was officially opened in 2015. Phase II will consist of a 2nd main bleacher, an Olympic-size swimming pool, and a baseball/softball field with bleachers, but it was unfinished and under investigated by COA. The said Butuan City Convention Center will be constructed starting on March 24, 2020, and located at the old unfinished sports complex in Libertad, although it remained unfinished for its completion by the next decade. However, according to Lawrence Fortun, the Polysports complex will began on July 29, 2026 with the cost of ₱190 million allocated fund for 2026. The rehabilitation of the Polysports Complex track oval and synthetic football field was started on July 24, 2026 by removing the rubberized track oval.

== Education ==
Being the regional center of Caraga, Butuan is also the region's center of education. There are two universities in the city. The first, Father Saturnino Urios University, a privately run school founded by Rev. Fr. Urios, S.J. in 1901. The second, the Caraga State University— Main Campus, formerly known as the Northern Mindanao State Institute of Science and Technology, is a state-run school founded in 1918. They are among the top two performing universities in the region.

Butuan is known for its education competence. Proof of these are in awards earned. Teachers and school staff of the Butuan Central Elementary School, Butuan City SPED Center and Agusan National High School have large-scale exposure to specialization techniques, as well as seminars and workshops to complement, with partnerships like Philippine-Australia Project on Basic Education (PROBE).

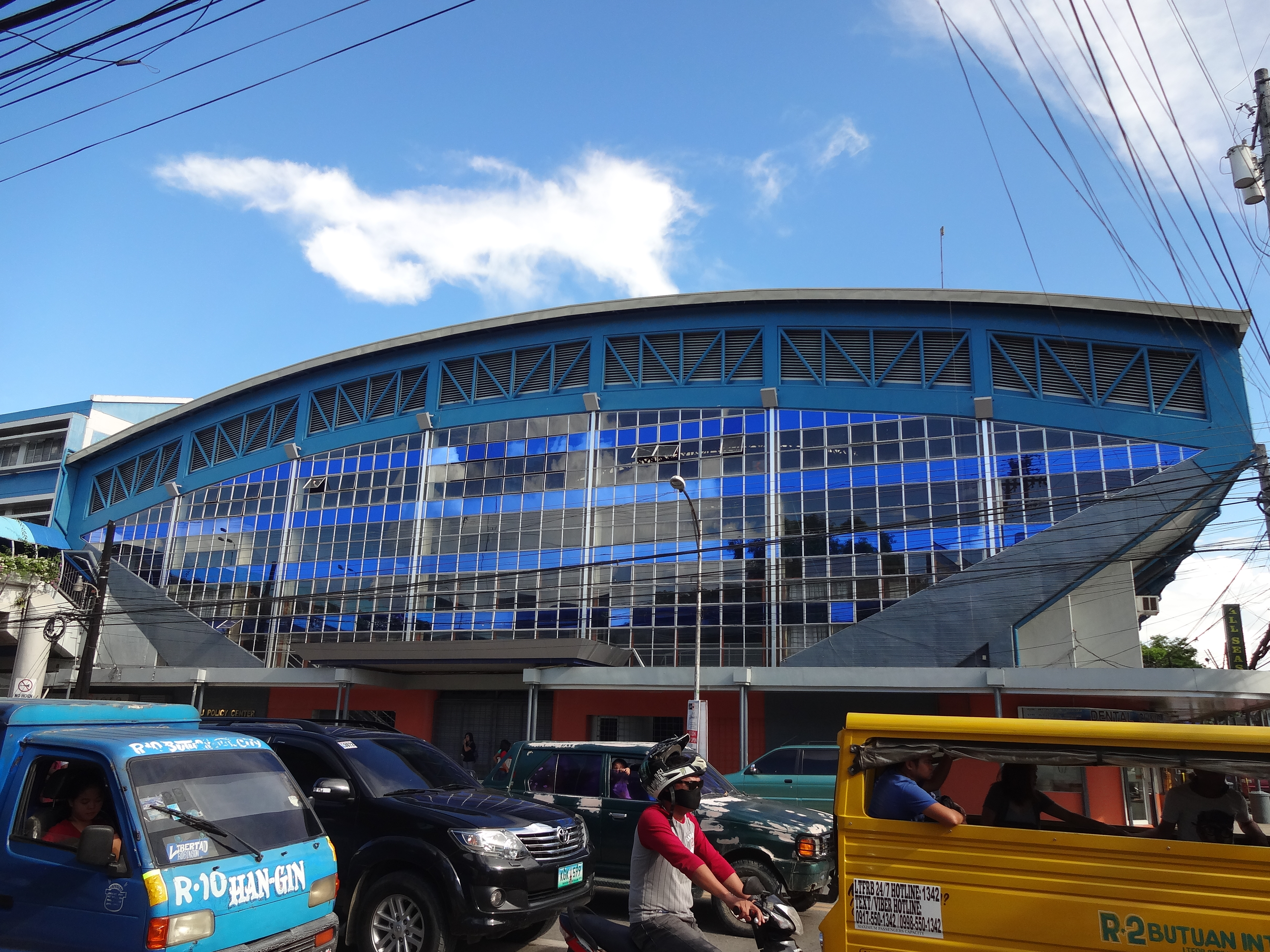
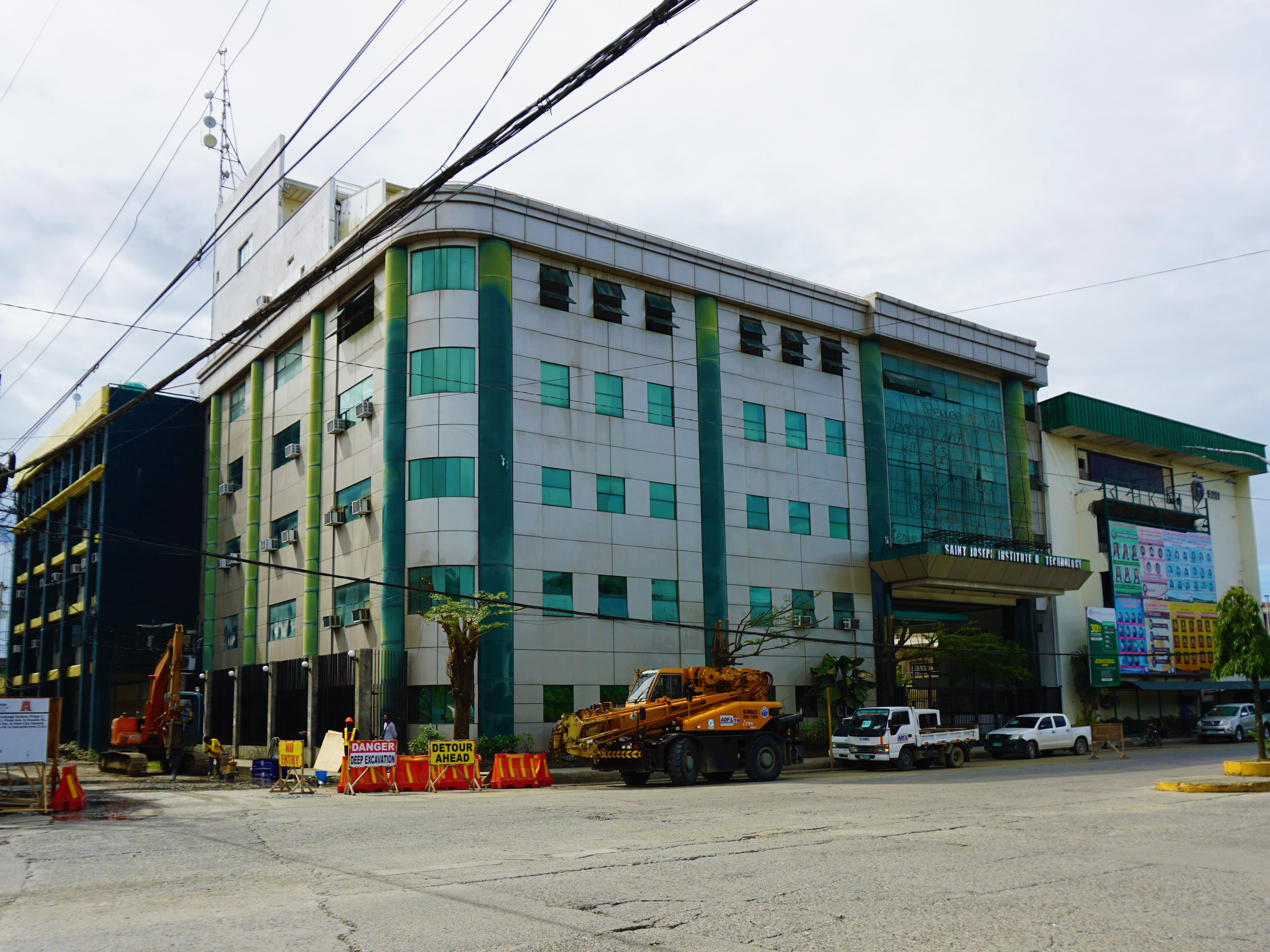
The newly renovated Urios Gym (left) and Saint Joseph Institute of Technology Main Campus (right).

National high schools include the Agusan NHS, Tungao NHS, San Vicente NHS, Libertad NHS and Ampayon ISS (Integrated Secondary School). The city is also home of the Butuan City School of Arts and Trades (BCSAT), a government-run specialization school in the fields of arts and in vocational courses which offers junior and senior high school.

As an education hub, Butuan has colleges with a variety of courses. Examples are the Saint Joseph Institute of Technology, Agusan Colleges, Inc., ACLC College of Butuan, Butuan Doctors' College, Asian College Foundation, Butuan City Colleges Inc., Balite Institute of Technology—Butuan, Father Urios Institute of Technology of Ampayon, Inc., Holy Child Colleges of Butuan, Elisa R. Ochoa Memorial Northern Mindanao School of Midwifery, Philippine Electronics and Communication Institute of Technology, Colegio de Caraga Inc. (former Agusan Institute of Technology), Saint Peter College Seminary, Corjesu Computer College, Agusan Business and Arts Foundation, and the Sunrise Christian College Foundation of the Philippines.

Big private universities like the Ateneo, De La Salle Philippines and Iglesia ni Cristo-owned New Era University (NEU) had also expressed to put up local branches.

Other notable schools include Timber City Academy (Butuan Chinese School), Enfant Cheri Study Centre, Rainbow of Angels Learning Center, Solid Rock Shilo Mission Academy, Ampayon Central Elementary School, Angelicum Montessori School, Butuan Grace Christian School, Butuan Christian Community School, Florencio R. Sibayan Central Elementary School, Libertad Central Elementary School, Obrero Elementary School, San Vicente Elementary School, and the Ong Yiu Central Elementary School.

== Notable personalities ==
- Allan Amoguis: Italian Catholic bishop, prelate of the Christian Patriarchate of East Asia (born 1973)
- Susan Fuentes: The Queen of Visayan Songs (1954–2013). She popularized the songs like Matud Nila, Usahay, Miss Kita Kung Christmas and Rosas Pandan.
- Laurice Guillen: Award-winning film director and actress, also the wife of the late actor Johnny Delgado.
- Edelmiro A. Amante, Sr.: Former Executive Secretary of Pres. Fidel V. Ramos. Former Representative of Second District and Governor of Agusan del Norte.
- Ardy Larong: Small forward/shooting guard of Alaska Aces in the Philippine Basketball Association (PBA).
- Marky Cielo: Actor of GMA Network. He died so young at the age of 20 on December 7, 2008, in Antipolo, Rizal. The cause of his death is still unknown.
- Stephany Stefanowitz: She represented Butuan in the Miss Philippines Earth 2010. In 2012, she joined Miss Philippines Earth and won the title as Miss Philippines Earth 2012 but she represented Quezon City. She grabbed the title as 1st runner-up in the Miss Earth 2012 pageant held in the country. Her mother is from Barangay Ampayon, Butuan and her father is from Hamburg, Germany.
- General Hernando DCA Iriberri: The former Chief of Staff of the Armed Forces of the Philippines from 2015 to 2016. He is not from Butuan but an alumnus of Fr. Saturnino Urios University High School department.
- Jason James Dy: The grand champion of the Voice of the Philippines Season 2.
- Roy Señeres: Presidential candidate of 2016 National and Local elections. He was the representative of the OFW Club Partylist from 2013 to 2016. He was also the ambassador to the United Arab Emirates during Fidel Ramos administration.
- Lance Busa: The grand winner of the first edition of Michael Bolton's singing competition "Bolt of Talent".
- Police General Debold Menorias Sinas: The 23rd Chief of the Philippine National Police and Undersecretary of the Office of the President of the Philippines.

== Sister cities ==
=== Local Sisterhood Pact ===
- Baguio (since May 16, 2011, via SP Res. No. 403-2011)
- Cebu City (since June 27, 2011, via SP Res. No. 493-2011) and Lapu-Lapu (since June 27, 2011, via SP Res. No. 493-A-2011)
- Iligan (since August 8, 2011, via SP Res. No. 538-2011)
- Malaybalay
- Pagadian
- Bayugan
- Makati (since June 13, 2011, via SP Res. No. 419-2011)
- Maragusan (since July 18, 2011, via SP Res. No. 527-2011)
- Dumaguete (since September 2, 2013, via SP Res. No. ___-2013)

== See also ==
- Diocese of Butuan
- List of radio stations in Butuan
