= Libera Università Maria SS. Assunta =

Private Roman Catholic university in Rome, Italy

Coordinates: 41°54′11″N 12°27′46″E

LUMSA University
- Libera Università Maria Santissima Assunta (Italian)
- Seal of LUMSA University
- Former name: Istituto Superiore di Magistero Maria Ss. Assunta
- Motto: In fide et humanitate (Latin)
- Motto in English: In faith and in humanity
- Type: Private university
- Established: October 26, 1939; 86 years ago
- Founders: Luigia Tincani, Venerable; Giuseppe Pizzardo; Pius XII
- Affiliations: BioGeM
- Religious affiliation: Roman Catholic
- Academic affiliations: EUA; IFCU
- President: Giovanni Lajolo
- Rector: Francesco Bonini
- Students: 7,200
- Location: Rome (main campus), Palermo, & Taranto, Italy
- Campus: Urban (multiple sites)
- Language: Italian and English
- Colors: Malachite and white
- Sporting affiliations: LUMSA Sport United
- Website: www.lumsa.it

LUMSA University (Italian: Libera Università Maria Santissima Assunta, lit. 'Free University of Mary Most Holy') is a private Roman Catholic university founded in 1939 in Rome. It is the second-oldest university in Rome after Sapienza.

== History and organization ==
The university began its life as the "Istituto Superiore di Magistero Maria Ss. Assunta", an educational institute for nuns founded in 1939 by Luigia Tincani (Royal Decree No. 1760 of 26 October 1939). In 1989, it was reconstituted as "Libera Università Maria SS. Assunta" (LUMSA), a university for women. The university was opened to men in 1991.

LUMSA is a private Catholic institution with autonomy at all levels of the university. As an Italian-accredited institution, its degrees are considered equivalent to those issued by Italian public universities.

The university is governed by a council which includes a President, a Rector, two Pro-Rectors, a Director General, and general council members. Since 2017, the President has been Cardinal Giovanni Lajolo.

University teaching is distributed across three departments:

- Department of Law, Economics, Politics, and Modern languages (Rome)
- Department of Law (Palermo)
- Department of Human Studies, Communication, Education, and Psychology (Rome)

The educational structure of LUMSA is arranged around four divisions. The university offers, through the divisions, undergraduate degrees (Italian laurea) in various social science fields. In post-graduate education, LUMSA offers several graduate programs and two long-cycle programs in law and education sciences, as well as four PhDs (Italian: dottorato di ricerca).

== Controversies ==
=== Public perception and the job market ===
In 2016, LUMSA received comments regarding the perceived value of the degrees it awarded, with some alumni reporting difficulties in having their qualifications fully recognized in the job market compared with those awarded by other universities, both public and private. According to ANVUR, "Although consultations with representatives of the labour market are formally carried out, they show several limitations. Meetings with stakeholders are undocumented and sporadic," and "stakeholder involvement in facilitating entry into the labour market appears weak."

=== Easy degrees ===
In 2007, LUMSA was criticized for awarding "easy, fast-track degrees, with first-year students becoming graduates in a short period of time and even highly complex exams being passed without difficulty thanks to the credit system," prompting investigations, including judicial inquiries, requested by the then Minister for Universities and Research.

=== Accusation of ableism ===
LUMSA's Taranto campus has been at the centre of controversy over alleged discrimination against students with disabilities. The incident drew criticism of the campus administration. However, the university stated that it is committed to ensuring an environment consistent with ethical principles and respect for academic values.

== Notable people ==
- Giuseppe Pizzardo, co-founder
- Luigi Traglia, president
- Mario Luigi Ciappi, president
- Antonio María Javierre Ortas, president
- Carlo Furno, president
- Attilio Nicora, president
- Cornelio Fabro, director
- Giuseppe Dalla Torre, rector between 1991 and 2014

=== Honorary degrees ===
These people received an honorary degree, but did not attend the university.

- Joseph Ratzinger (future Pope Benedict XVI), honorary degree in law, 1999
- Liliana Segre, honorary degree in international relations, 2020
- Sergio Cotta, honorary degree in law, 1999
- Liliana Cavani, honorary degree in communication sciences, 1999
- Carlo Lizzani, honorary degree in media studies, 2009

== See also ==
- List of Italian universities
- BioGeM consortium
