= Italian mountain community =

Territorial association of mountain and foothill Italian comuni

A mountain community (Italian: comunità montana) in Italy is a territorial association of mountain and foothill municipalities. Mountain communities were established by law on 3 December 1971 as statutory bodies with compulsory municipal membership within their defined territory. It is constituted by the president of the regional council and the mountain and foothill comuni, even those that may be located in different provinces. Their purpose is to jointly exercise certain municipal functions and to execute their functions specifically assigned by the region.

== Debate ==
Mountain communities are the subject of much debate in Italy. In Sicily, they were abolished in 1986. In Friuli-Venezia Giulia, they were abolished in 2001, were later reintroduced in 2004, and were once again abolished on 1 August 2016. In Sardinia, they were abolished in 2007. In Molise, after proposing a reduction in the number of mountain communities, they were abolished. In Lombardy, since 2009, the number of mountain communities dropped from 30 to 23. Puglia abolished mountain communities, but the Constitutional Court of Italy declared the act partially unlawful. In Liguria, their number was reduced from 19 to 12 in 2009, and were abolished altogether on 1 May 2011. The mountain communities of Piedmont, after a reorganization in 2010, were abolished in 2012.
