= Jabonga =

Municipality in Agusan del Norte, Philippines

- Municipality
- Municipality of Jabonga
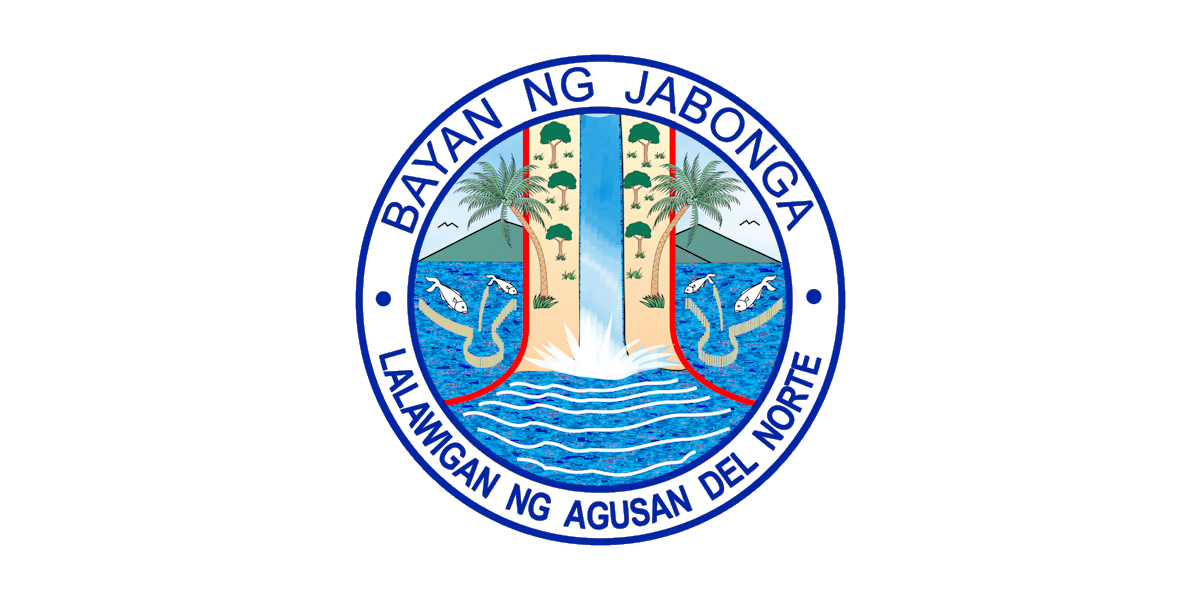
- Flag Seal

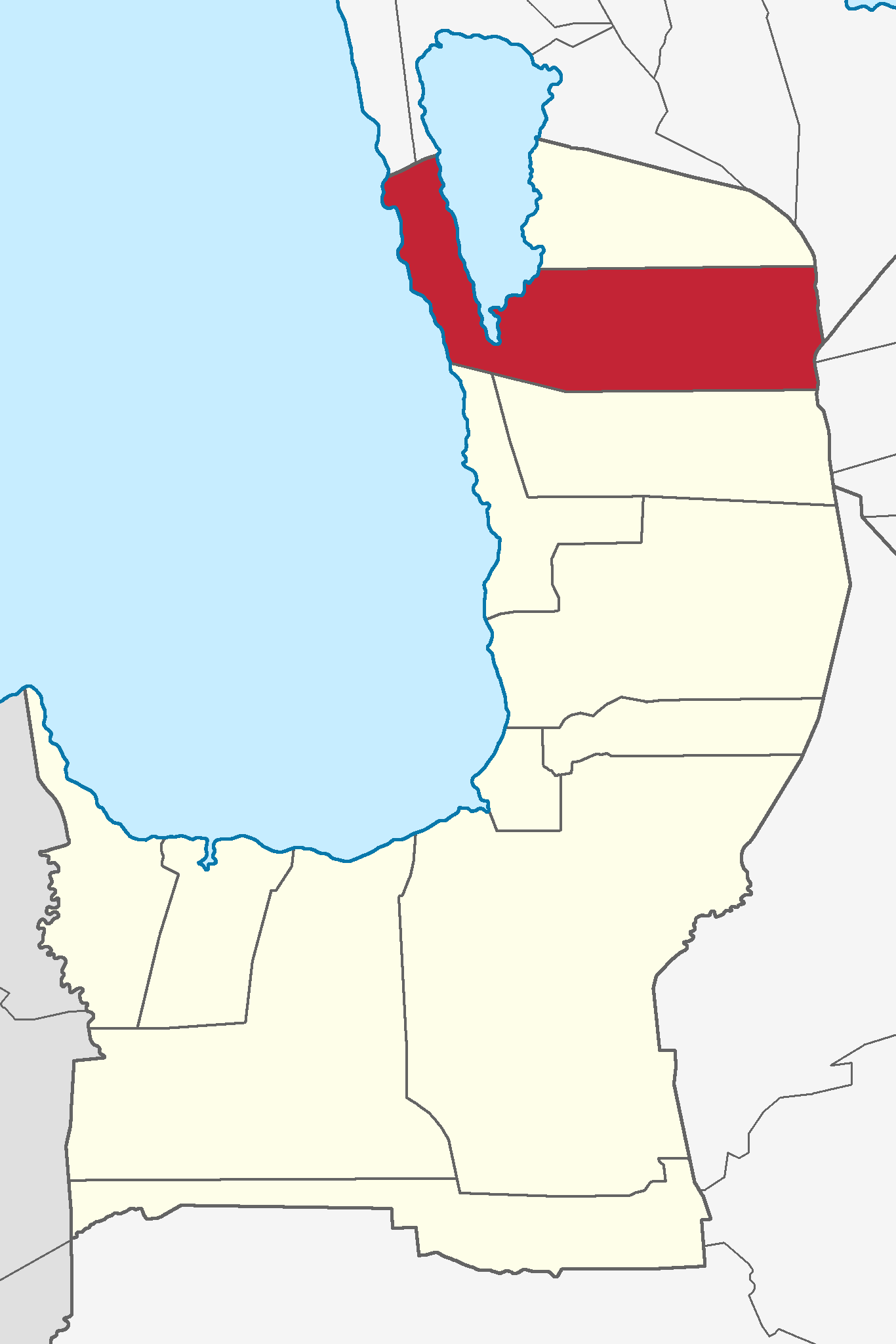
- Map of Agusan del Norte with Jabonga highlighted
- Interactive map of Jabonga
- Location within the Philippines
- Coordinates: 9°20′35″N 125°30′56″E
- Country: Philippines
- Region: Caraga
- Province: Agusan del Norte
- District: Lone district
- Barangays: 15 (see Barangays)

Government
  - Type: Sangguniang Bayan
  - Mayor: Napoleon M. Montero
  - Vice Mayor: Danny M. Moran
  - Representative: Dale Corvera
  - Municipal Council: Members: LANQUINO, MELVIN; TELLO, VICMAR; GANOT, JULIE; BERMUDEZ, PAM; MALDO, BEMBOT; CARSULA, GING; PEROY, TATA; ALINGATO, INDAY
  - Electorate: 17,167 voters (2025)

Area
  - Total: 293 km^{2} (113 sq mi)
- Elevation: 114 m (374 ft)
- Highest elevation: 627 m (2,057 ft)
- Lowest elevation: 0 m (0 ft)

Population (2024 census)
  - Total: 25,937
  - Density: 88.5/km^{2} (229/sq mi)
  - Households: 6,207

Economy
  - Income class: 2nd municipal income class
  - Poverty incidence: 24.57% (2023)
  - Revenue: ₱ 206.7 million (2024)
  - Assets: ₱ 428 million (2024)
  - Expenditure: ₱ 124.3 million (2024)
  - Liabilities: ₱ 188.2 million (2024)

Service provider
  - Electricity: Agusan del Norte Electric Cooperative (ANECO)
- Time zone: UTC+8 (PST)
- ZIP code: 8607
- PSGC: 1600205000
- IDD : area code: +63 (0)85
- Native languages: Surigaonon; Butuanon; Cebuano; Higaonon; Mamanwa; Tagalog
- Website: www.jabongaadn.gov.ph

Jabonga, officially the Municipality of Jabonga (Cebuano: Lungsod sa Jabonga; Tagalog: Bayan ng Jabonga), is a municipality in the province of Agusan del Norte, Philippines. According to the 2024 census, it has a population of 25,937 people.

== Geography ==
According to the Philippine Statistics Authority, the municipality has a land area of 293 square kilometres (113 sq mi) constituting 10.73% of the 2,730.24-square-kilometre- (1,054.15 sq mi) total area of Agusan del Norte.

Jabonga is bounded by Kitcharao and Surigao del Norte to the north; Butuan Bay to the west; Tubay and Santiago to the south; Surigao del Sur to the east. It is 60 kilometres (37 mi) from Butuan City.

The topography of the land features plain to rolling and hills. Among the municipalities, Jabonga ranks first in total area and number of farms (464) mostly owned by individuals. It has one of the 36 crop storage facilities of the province. Its major crops are coconut, rice, corn, timber and both fresh and sea-water fish.

=== Climate ===
Climate data for Jabonga, Agusan del Norte
Month	Jan	Feb	Mar	Apr	May	Jun	Jul	Aug	Sep	Oct	Nov	Dec	Year
Mean daily maximum °C (°F)	27 (81)	27 (81)	28 (82)	29 (84)	30 (86)	29 (84)	29 (84)	29 (84)	29 (84)	29 (84)	28 (82)	28 (82)	29 (83)
Mean daily minimum °C (°F)	23 (73)	23 (73)	23 (73)	23 (73)	24 (75)	25 (77)	24 (75)	24 (75)	24 (75)	24 (75)	24 (75)	23 (73)	24 (74)
Average precipitation mm (inches)	210 (8.3)	161 (6.3)	123 (4.8)	85 (3.3)	148 (5.8)	186 (7.3)	164 (6.5)	157 (6.2)	141 (5.6)	190 (7.5)	223 (8.8)	200 (7.9)	1,988 (78.3)
Average rainy days	21.0	16.8	18.5	18.2	24.9	27.7	28.4	27.0	26.1	27.6	24.6	22.0	282.8
Source: Meteoblue

=== Barangays ===
Jabonga is politically subdivided into 15 barangays. Each barangay consists of puroks while some have sitios.

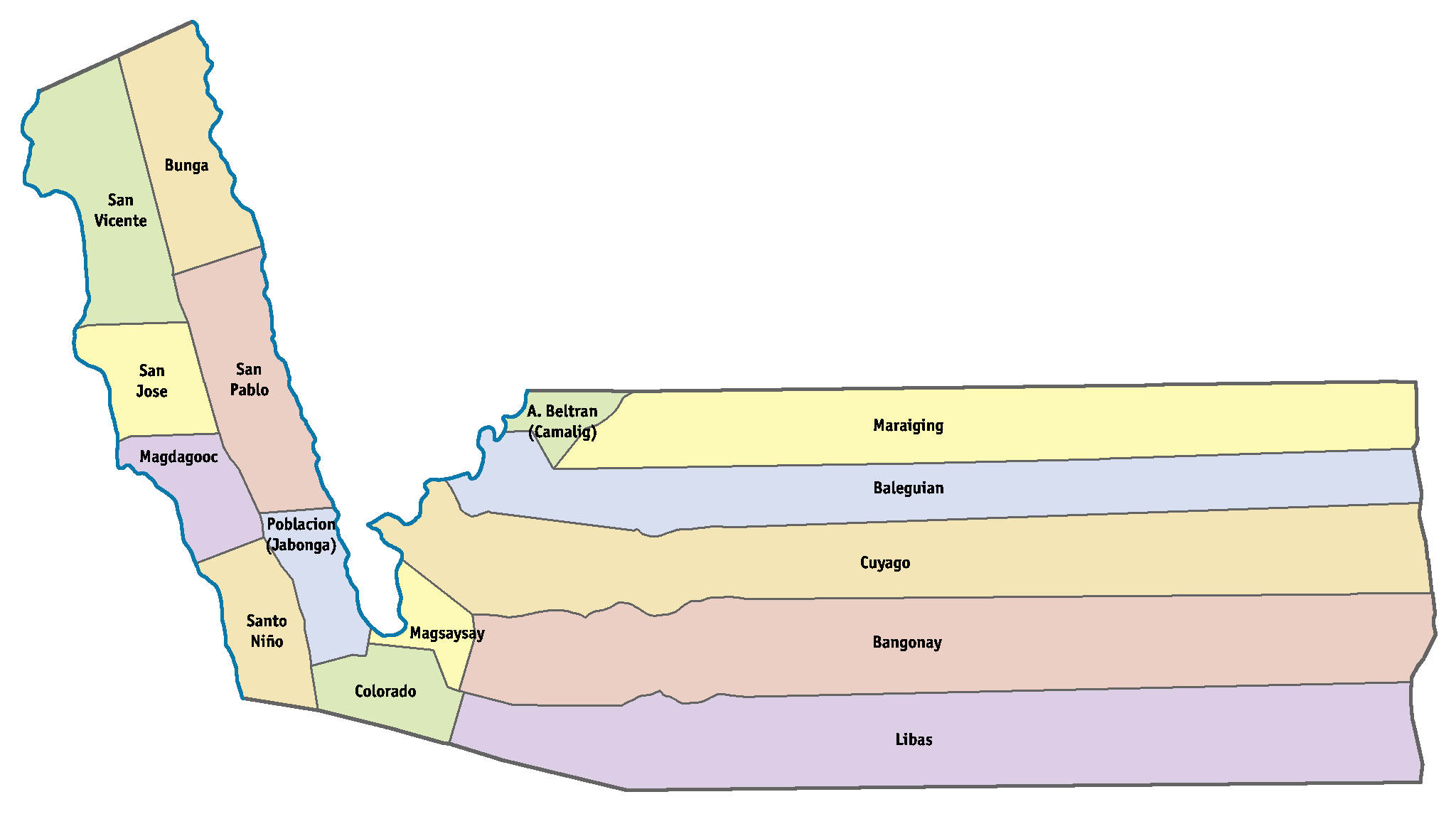
Political map of Jabonga

PSGC	Barangay	Population			±% p.a.	
		2024		2010		
160205003	A. Beltran (Camalig)	4.2%	1,077	1,149	▾	−0.45%
160205001	Baleguian	8.9%	2,301	2,136	▴	0.52%
160205002	Bangonay	13.0%	3,361	3,073	▴	0.62%
160205004	Bunga	3.2%	842	951	▾	−0.84%
160205005	Colorado	7.2%	1,858	1,570	▴	1.18%
160205006	Cuyago	7.5%	1,949	2,015	▾	−0.23%
160205007	Libas	5.5%	1,437	1,455	▾	−0.09%
160205008	Magdagooc	6.1%	1,585	1,464	▴	0.55%
160205009	Magsaysay	4.3%	1,117	1,155	▾	−0.23%
160205010	Maraiging	2.0%	526	507	▴	0.26%
160205011	Poblacion (Jabonga)	15.4%	4,004	3,713	▴	0.53%
160205012	San Jose	3.6%	921	977	▾	−0.41%
160205013	San Pablo	5.0%	1,299	957	▴	2.14%
160205014	San Vicente	6.2%	1,611	1,747	▾	−0.56%
160205015	Santo Niño	3.7%	967	964	▴	0.02%
	Total		25,937	23,833	▴	0.59%

== Demographics ==
Population census of Jabonga
Year	Pop.	±% p.a.
1903	1,450	—
1918	2,545	+3.82%
1939	5,004	+3.27%
1948	7,700	+4.91%
1960	14,721	+5.55%
1970	12,129	−1.92%
1975	14,742	+3.99%
1980	15,912	+1.54%
1990	18,610	+1.58%
1995	20,196	+1.54%
2000	20,501	+0.32%
2007	23,052	+1.63%
2010	23,833	+1.22%
2015	23,184	−0.52%
2020	24,855	+1.48%
2024	25,937	+1.03%
Source: Philippine Statistics Authority

In the 2024 census, Jabonga had a population of 25,937. The population density was 89 inhabitants per square kilometre (230/sq mi).

== Economy ==
Poverty incidence of Jabonga (%)

Source: Philippine Statistics Authority

Jabonga is home of the 24.9 mW Lake Mainit Hydro Power Plant that will serves Agusan del Norte.

== Culture ==
=== Festivals and celebrations ===
- Sumayajaw Festival- Held during the town fiesta of Jabonga. It is a thanksgiving celebration for the bounties showered by the Heavenly Father through the intercession of the Blessed Virgin Mary, the Lady of Assumption.
- Baoto Festival- Held annually, this is a regional race for native wooden barotos, the main event is the 30K Paddling Marathon. Other activities include tree planting, adventure skills clinic, triathlon, airsoft match and bikini open.

== Transportation ==
=== By land ===
Jabonga is accessible by bus from Bachelor Express, Davao Metro Shuttle, or Surigao Bus via Butuan-Surigao routes or vice versa. There are also vans, jeep and multi-cabs that have routes towards both Surigao City and Butuan which are stationed in Jabonga Integrated Land Transport Terminal.
