= Santiago, Agusan del Norte =

Municipality in Agusan del Norte, Philippines

Santiago
- Municipality
- Municipality of Santiago
- Municipal government center

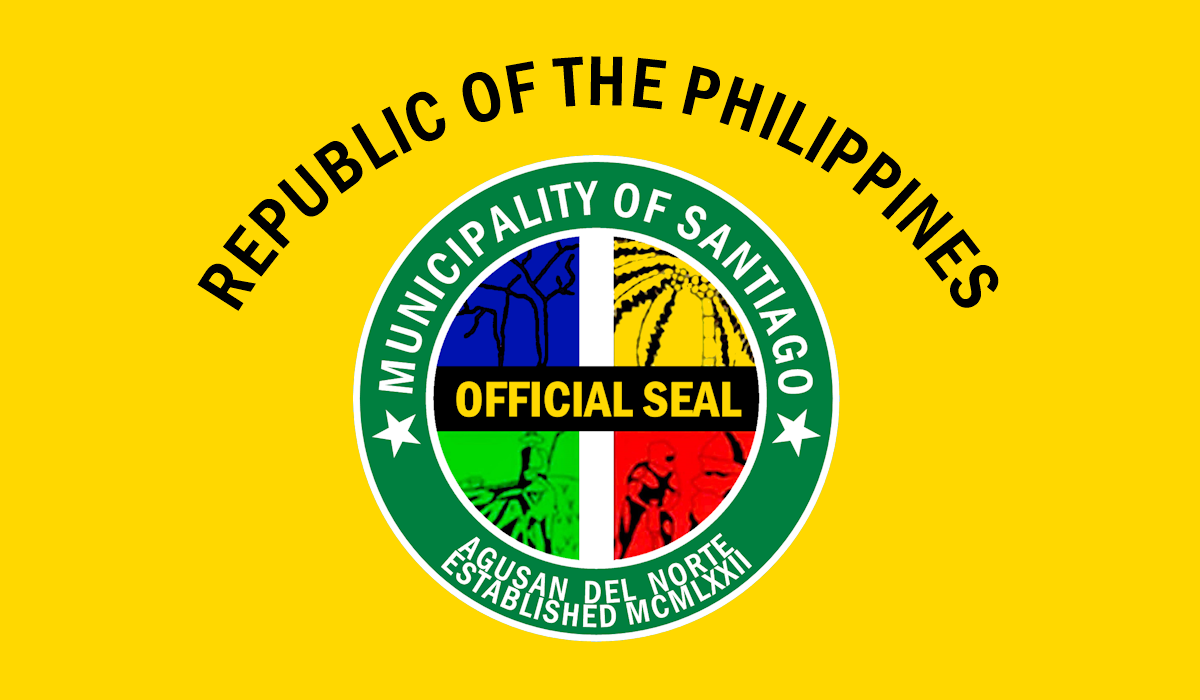
- Flag Seal

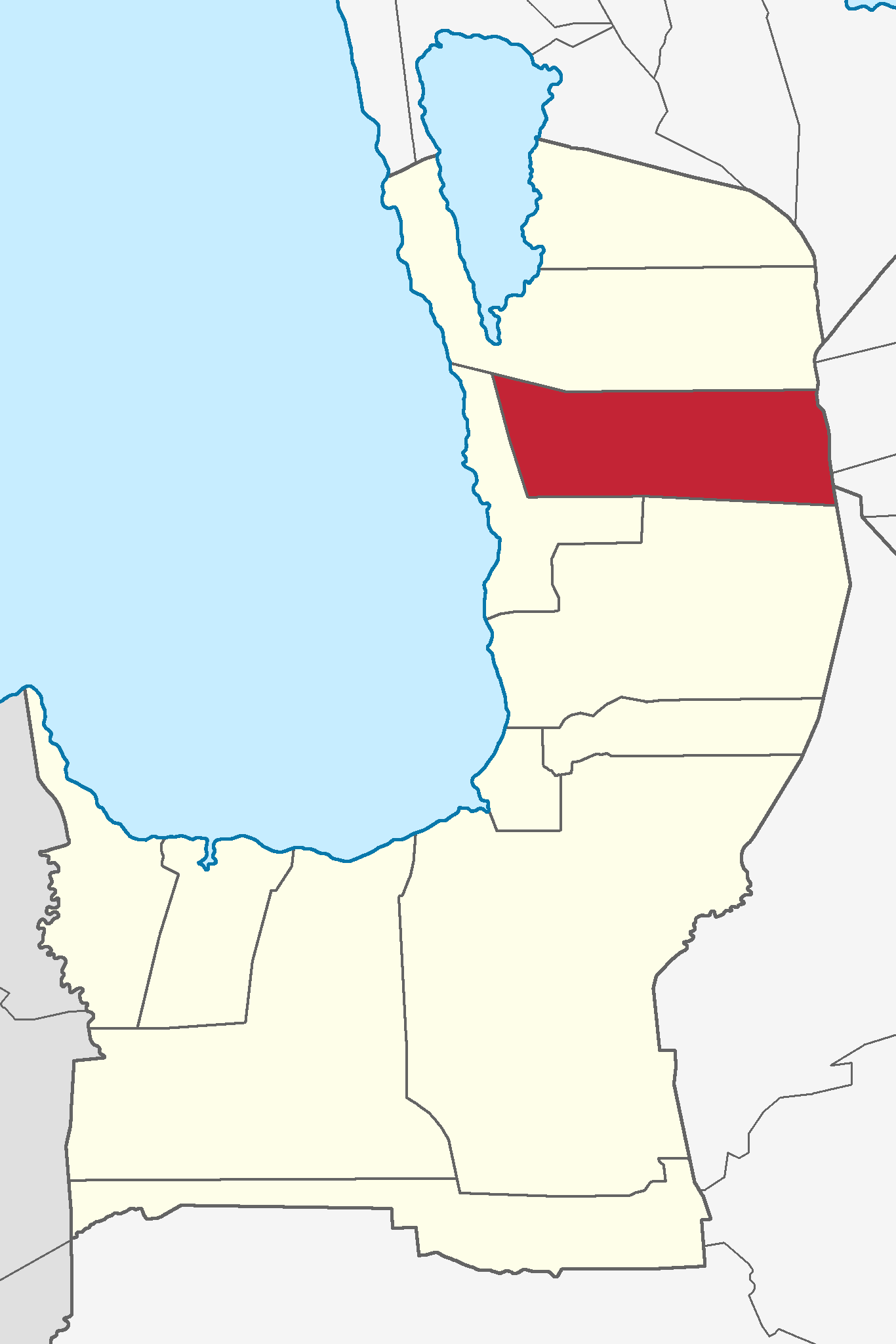
- Map of Agusan del Norte with Santiago highlighted
- Interactive map of Santiago
- Location within the Philippines
- Coordinates: 9°16′N 125°34′E
- Country: Philippines
- Region: Caraga
- Province: Agusan del Norte
- District: Lone district
- Founded: January 1, 1937
- Chartered: 1969
- Named for: St. James the Great
- Barangays: 9 (see Barangays)

Government
  - Type: Sangguniang Bayan
  - Mayor: Franklin D. Lim
  - Vice Mayor: Zenaida C. Lim
  - Representative: Dale Corvera
  - Municipal Council: Members: Brendo P. Acierto; Sulpicio T. Dedumo; Benjie L. Montes; Esmeraldo R. Acierto Jr.; Luzmindo M. Pascua; Lutgardes M. Dolaoco; Nestor M. Monteclaro; Danilo G. Pablo Sr.
  - Electorate: 15,159 voters (2025)

Area
  - Total: 275.61 km^{2} (106.41 sq mi)
- Elevation: 267 m (876 ft)
- Highest elevation: 1,059 m (3,474 ft)
- Lowest elevation: 23 m (75 ft)

Population (2024 census)
  - Total: 33,877
  - Density: 122.92/km^{2} (318.35/sq mi)
  - Households: 5,858

Economy
  - Income class: 1st municipal income class
  - Poverty incidence: 29.22% (2023)
  - Revenue: ₱ 197 million (2024)
  - Assets: ₱ 712.2 million (2024)
  - Expenditure: ₱ 51.91 million (2024)
  - Liabilities: ₱ 59.21 million (2024)

Service provider
  - Electricity: Agusan del Norte Electric Cooperative (ANECO)
- Time zone: UTC+8 (PST)
- ZIP code: 8608
- PSGC: 1600210000
- IDD : area code: +63 (0)85
- Native languages: Agusan; Butuanon; Cebuano; Higaonon; Tagalog; Surigaonon
- Website: www.santiagoadn.gov.ph

Santiago, officially the Municipality of Santiago (Cebuano: Lungsod sa Santiago; Tagalog: Bayan ng Santiago), is a municipality in the province of Agusan del Norte, Philippines. According to the 2024 census, it has a population of 33,877 people.

== History ==
In the later part of 1898, a group of natives fleeing from the municipality of Jabonga settled in a place recognized by the municipality of Cabadbaran as barrio Santiago, However, in 1924 the Aciga River swelled its banks, destroying all properties, crops and animals along it. This forced the inhabitants of Santiago, Cabadbaran to transfer to barrio Jagupit. In 1936, the same river wrought extensive damage which made the inhabitants decide to transfer at the foot of the hill, particularly at Sitio Paypay, which was inhabited by two groups of natives-the Manobo and the Mamanwa.

The construction of the national highway, which passes thru sitio Paypay, lured more people to settle in the place.

On April 26, 1959, the name Paypay was changed to Santiago through Republic Act 2170, in honor of Senior Santiago or Saint James.

In 1964, the barrio officials of Santiago indicated their desire to become a separate municipality. Finally, on June 15, 1969, the barrios of Santiago and Jagupit were separated from Cabadbaran and constituted into the new municipality of Santiago, through Republic Act 5242.

== Geography ==
According to the Philippine Statistics Authority, the municipality has a land area of 275.61 square kilometres (106.41 sq mi) constituting 10.09% of the 2,730.24-square-kilometre- (1,054.15 sq mi) total area of Agusan del Norte.

=== Climate ===
Climate data for Santiago, Agusan del Norte
Month	Jan	Feb	Mar	Apr	May	Jun	Jul	Aug	Sep	Oct	Nov	Dec	Year
Mean daily maximum °C (°F)	27 (81)	27 (81)	28 (82)	29 (84)	30 (86)	29 (84)	29 (84)	29 (84)	29 (84)	29 (84)	28 (82)	28 (82)	29 (83)
Mean daily minimum °C (°F)	23 (73)	22 (72)	22 (72)	23 (73)	24 (75)	25 (77)	24 (75)	24 (75)	24 (75)	24 (75)	24 (75)	23 (73)	24 (74)
Average precipitation mm (inches)	210 (8.3)	161 (6.3)	123 (4.8)	85 (3.3)	148 (5.8)	186 (7.3)	164 (6.5)	157 (6.2)	141 (5.6)	190 (7.5)	223 (8.8)	200 (7.9)	1,988 (78.3)
Average rainy days	21.0	16.8	18.5	18.2	24.9	27.7	28.4	27.0	26.1	27.6	24.6	22.0	282.8
Source: Meteoblue

=== Barangays ===
Santiago is politically subdivided into 9 barangays. Each barangay consists of puroks while some have sitios.

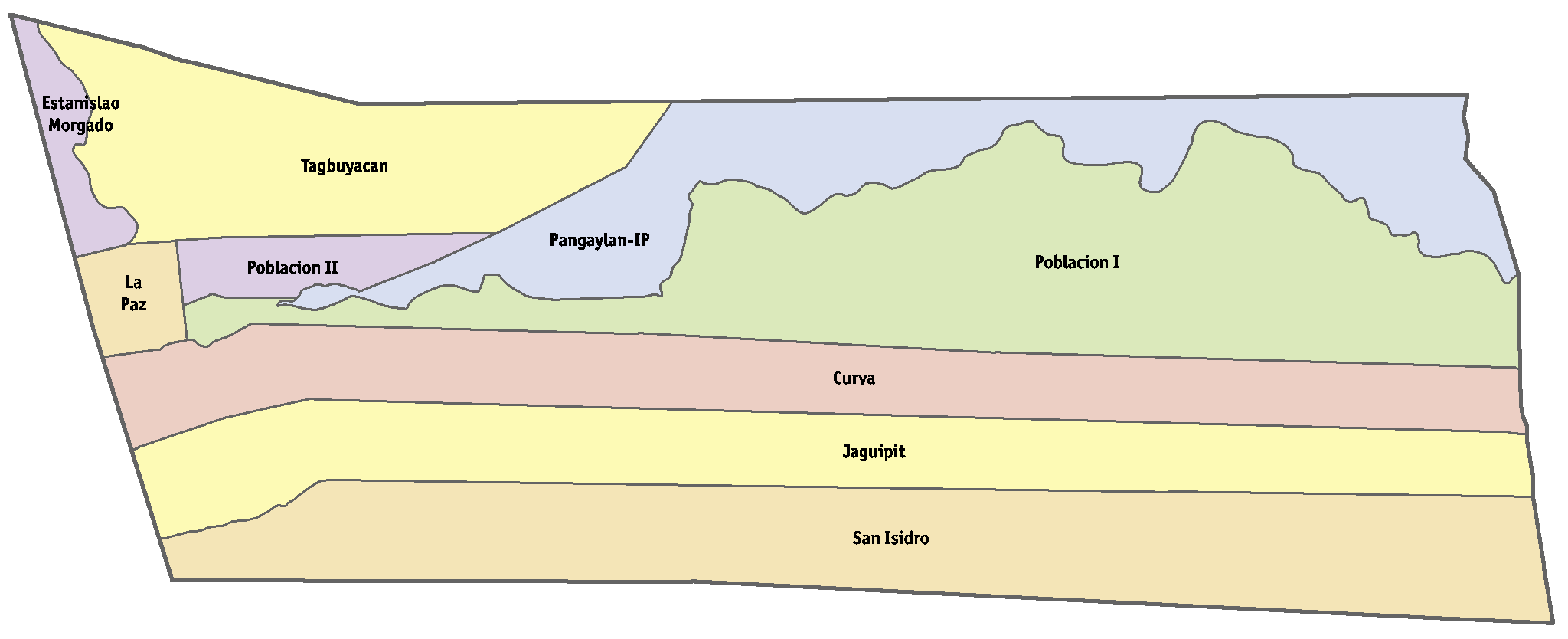
Political map of Santiago

PSGC	Barangay	Population			±% p.a.	
		2024		2010		
160210002	Curva	8.3%	2,828	2,041	▴	2.29%
160210010	Estanislao Morgado	6.0%	2,027	1,347	▴	2.87%
160210003	Jagupit	9.4%	3,179	2,254	▴	2.41%
160210005	La Paz	5.6%	1,888	1,520	▴	1.51%
160210007	Poblacion I	18.8%	6,374	5,442	▴	1.10%
160210011	Poblacion II	14.1%	4,785	3,931	▴	1.37%
160210008	San Isidro	8.8%	2,972	2,334	▴	1.69%
160210009	Tagbuyacan	7.5%	2,525	2,086	▴	1.33%
	Total		33,877	20,955	▴	3.38%

- Pangaylan-IP is a newly established barangay and was initially created from Poblacion I in 2011 through local ordinance, but its legal status was formally ratified and solidified at the national level in 2022. However, its population does not have its data yet as of 2010. According to the 2024 census, its population was 2,079.

== Demographics ==
Population census of Santiago
Year	Pop.	±% p.a.
1970	5,005	—
1975	6,470	+5.28%
1980	7,663	+3.44%
1990	12,775	+5.24%
1995	15,616	+3.83%
2000	17,925	+3.00%
2007	18,931	+0.76%
2010	20,955	+3.77%
2015	24,200	+2.78%
2020	28,657	+3.62%
2024	33,877	+4.10%
Source: Philippine Statistics Authority

In the 2024 census, Santiago had a population of 33,877. The population density was 120 inhabitants per square kilometre (310/sq mi).
