= Agusan del Norte's at-large congressional district =

Legislative district of the Philippines

- Constituency for the House of Representatives of the Philippines
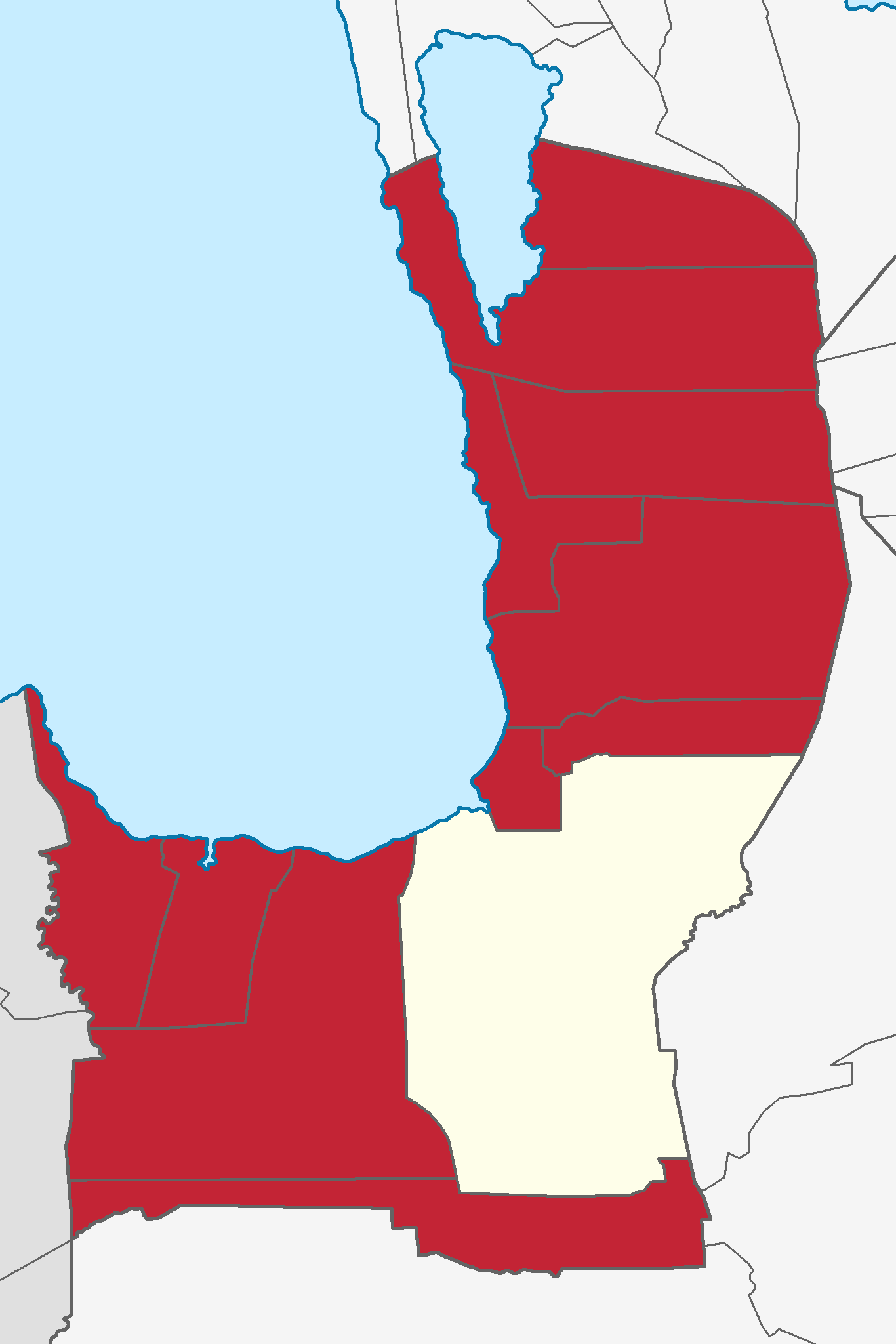
- Map of Agusan del Norte's at-large congressional district

- Location of Agusan del Norte within the Philippines
- Province: Agusan del Norte
- Region: Caraga
- Population: 404,100 (2024)
- Electorate: 272,163 (2025)
- Major settlements: 11 LGUs: Cities; Cabadbaran; Municipalities; Buenavista; Carmen; Jabonga; Kitcharao; Las Nieves; Magallanes; Nasipit; Remedios T. Romualdez; Santiago; Tubay
- Area: 2,730.24 km^{2} (1,054.15 sq mi)

Current constituency
- Created: 1967
- Representative: Dale Corvera
- Political party: PFP
- Congressional bloc: Majority

Agusan del Norte's at-large congressional district is the sole congressional district in the province of Agusan del Norte in the Philippines. It was previously represented in the House of Representatives of the Philippines from 1969 to 1972 and in the Regular Batasang Pambansa from 1984 to 1986, and was re-created in 2022. The district encompasses the city of Cabadbaran, the provincial capital, and all municipalities of Agusan del Norte. It is currently represented in the 20th Congress by Dale Corvera of the Lakas–CMD.

It was created in 1967 as a result of the creation of the province of Agusan del Norte out of Agusan province, with Agusan del Norte comprising the northern part of the former province. The district elected its first representative province-wide at-large during the 1969 Philippine House of Representatives elections. However, the representative system was eliminated following the dissolution of the lower house in 1972. The district was subsequently absorbed into the multi-member Region X's district for the national parliament in 1978. In 1984, provincial and city representation was restored, and Agusan del Norte elected a member to the regular parliament. It became obsolete following the 1987 reapportionment that established two districts in the province under the new constitution.

The district served as an electoral district in the 1971 Constitutional Convention, with two delegates representing Agusan del Norte at-large.

In 2022, the district was re-created through a law that merged Agusan del Norte's two districts and established Butuan's at-large congressional district as a separate congressional district from the province. The district was contested again in the May 2025 elections.

== Recent election results from province-wide races ==
Year	Office	Results
2025	Governor	Angelica Amante (PDP–Laban) 97.19%

== List of members representing the district ==
=== House of Representatives (1945–1973) ===
Portrait	Member	Term of office		Legislature	Party	Electoral history	Constituent LGUs
Portrait	Member	Start	End	Legislature	Party	Electoral history	Constituent LGUs
District created June 17, 1967, from Agusan's at-large district.
	Guillermo Sanchez	December 30, 1969	January 17, 1973	7th Congress	Nacionalista	Elected in 1969. Term cut short upon the ratification of a new Constitution.	1969–1973; Buenavista, Cabadbaran, Carmen, Jabonga, Kitcharao, Las Nieves, Magallanes, Nasipit, Santiago, Tubay
District dissolved into the nine-seat Region X's at-large district for the Interim Batasang Pambansa.

=== 1971 Constitutional Convention (1971–1972) ===
Seat A						Seat B						Legislature	Constituent LGUs
Portrait	Member	Term of office		Party	Electoral history	Portrait	Member	Term of office		Party	Electoral history	Legislature	Constituent LGUs
Portrait	Member	Start	End	Party	Electoral history	Portrait	Member	Start	End	Party	Electoral history	Legislature	Constituent LGUs
	Edelmiro Amante	June 1, 1971	November 29, 1972	Nonpartisan	Elected in 1970.		Antonio Tupaz	June 1, 1971	November 29, 1972	Nonpartisan	Elected in 1970.	1971 Constitutional Convention	1971–1972; Buenavista, Cabadbaran, Carmen, Jabonga, Kitcharao, Las Nieves, Magallanes, Nasipit, Santiago, Tubay

=== Batasang Pambansa (1978–1986) ===
Portrait	Member	Term of office		Legislature	Party	Electoral history	Constituent LGUs
Portrait	Member	Start	End	Legislature	Party	Electoral history	Constituent LGUs
District re-created February 1, 1984.
	Edelmiro Amante	June 30, 1984	March 25, 1986	Nacionalista	KBL	Elected in 1984.	1984–1986; Buenavista, Cabadbaran, Carmen, Jabonga, Kitcharao, Las Nieves, Magallanes, Nasipit, Remedios T. Romualdez, Santiago, Tubay
District dissolved into Agusan del Norte's 1st and 2nd districts.

=== House of Representatives (1987–present) ===
Portrait	Member	Term of office		Legislature	Party	Electoral history	Constituent LGUs
Portrait	Member	Start	End	Legislature	Party	Electoral history	Constituent LGUs
District re-created April 27, 2022, from Agusan del Norte's 1st and 2nd districts.
	Dale Corvera	June 30, 2025	Incumbent	20th Congress	Lakas	Redistricted from the 2nd district and re-elected in 2025.	2025–present Buenavista, Cabadbaran, Carmen, Jabonga, Kitcharao, Las Nieves, Magallanes, Nasipit, Remedios T. Romualdez, Santiago, Tubay
	Dale Corvera	June 30, 2025	Incumbent	20th Congress	PFP	Redistricted from the 2nd district and re-elected in 2025.	2025–present Buenavista, Cabadbaran, Carmen, Jabonga, Kitcharao, Las Nieves, Magallanes, Nasipit, Remedios T. Romualdez, Santiago, Tubay

== Election results ==
=== 2025 ===
2025 Philippine House of Representatives election in Agusan del Norte
Party	Candidate	Votes	%
Lakas	Dale Corvera	177,431	100.00
Total votes		177,431	100.00
Lakas win (new seat)			

== See also ==
- Legislative districts of Agusan del Norte
- Legislative district of Butuan
