= Kitcharao =

Municipality in Agusan del Norte, Philippines

- Municipality
- Municipality of Kitcharao
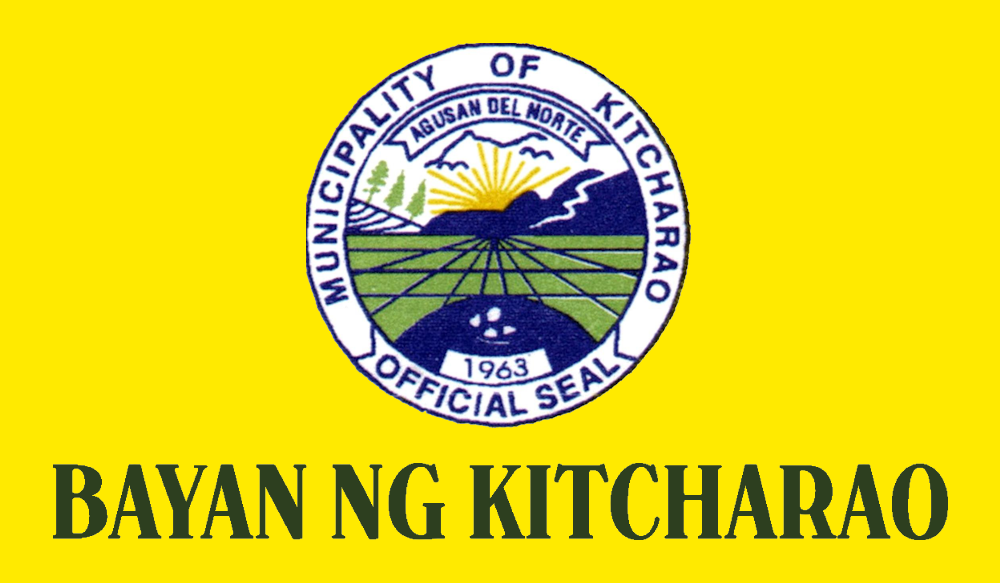
- Flag Seal

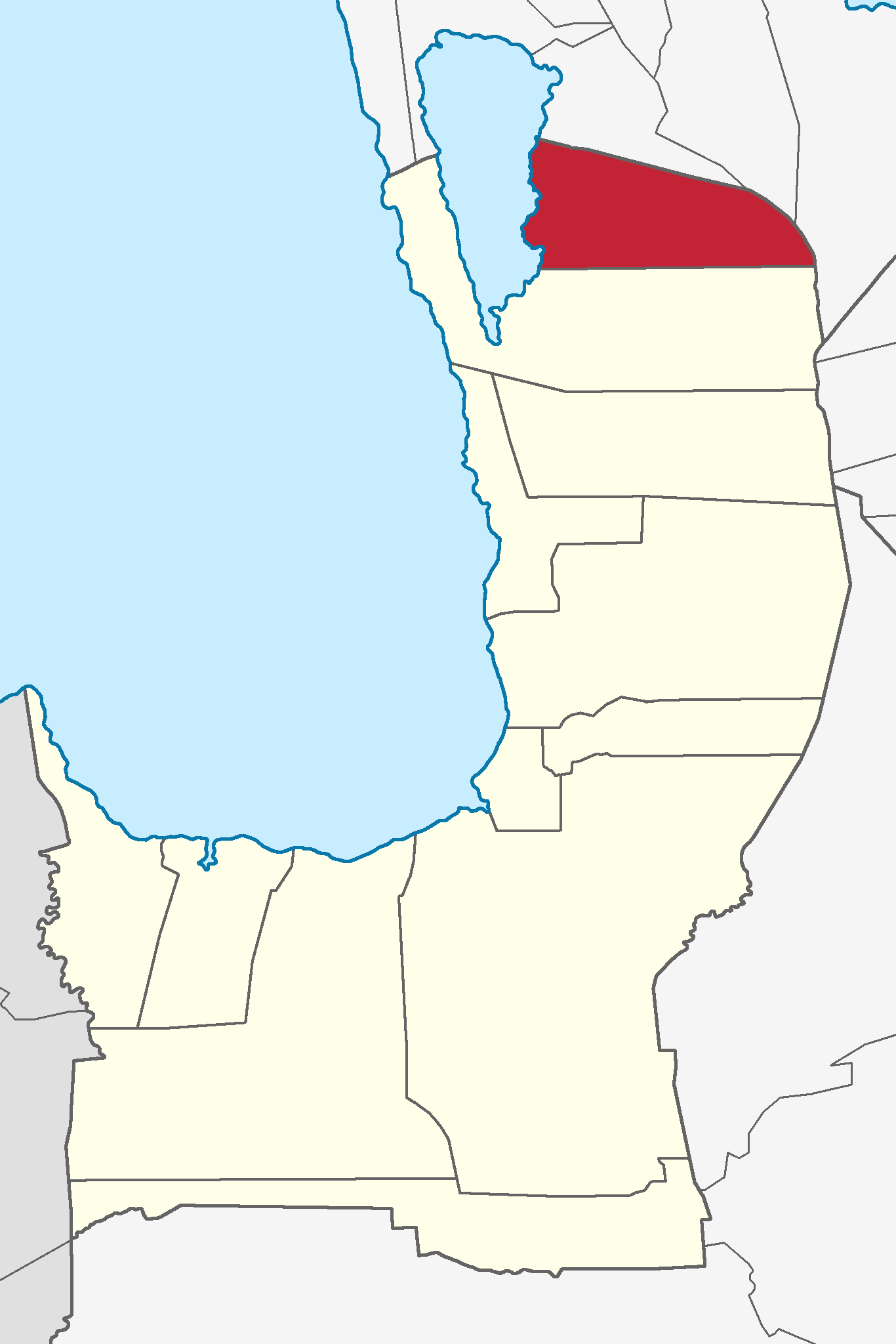
- Map of Agusan del Norte with Kitcharao highlighted
- Interactive map of Kitcharao
- Location within the Philippines
- Coordinates: 9°28′N 125°35′E
- Country: Philippines
- Region: Caraga
- Province: Agusan del Norte
- District: Lone district
- Founded: August 29, 1963
- Barangays: 11 (see Barangays)

Government
  - Type: Sangguniang Bayan
  - Mayor: Aristotle E. Montante
  - Vice Mayor: Leo D. Galua
  - Representative: Dale Corvera
  - Municipal Council: Members: Visminda L. Nueva; Romeo B. Dizon; Apolinario M. Galido; Ricardo M. Agan; Merlina M. Cebrian; Miguelito E. Baron; Joseph C. Remonte; Zosima R. Samoya
  - Electorate: 14,096 voters (2025)

Area
  - Total: 171.92 km^{2} (66.38 sq mi)
- Elevation: 168 m (551 ft)
- Highest elevation: 772 m (2,533 ft)
- Lowest elevation: 38 m (125 ft)

Population (2024 census)
  - Total: 22,671
  - Density: 131.87/km^{2} (341.54/sq mi)
  - Households: 4,969

Economy
  - Income class: 3rd municipal income class
  - Poverty incidence: 27.72% (2023)
  - Revenue: ₱ 156.2 million (2024)
  - Assets: ₱ 621.4 million (2024)
  - Expenditure: ₱ 152.1 million (2024)
  - Liabilities: ₱ 9.97 million (2024)

Service provider
  - Electricity: Agusan del Norte Electric Cooperative (ANECO)
- Time zone: UTC+8 (PST)
- ZIP code: 8609
- PSGC: 1600206000
- IDD : area code: +63 (0)85
- Native languages: Agusan; Butuanon; Cebuano; Higaonon; Mamanwa; Tagalog
- Website: www.kitcharaoadn.gov.ph

Kitcharao, officially the Municipality of Kitcharao (Cebuano: Lungsod sa Kitcharao; Tagalog: Bayan ng Kitcharao), is a municipality in the province of Agusan del Norte, Philippines. According to the 2024 census, it has a population of 22,671 people.

== History ==
Kitcharao was created on June 22, 1963, under Republic Act No. 3842, sponsored by Congressman Guillermo R. Sánchez. It was once a barrio of Jabonga. Through the initiative of the then Vice Mayor Francisco M. Tuozo of Jabonga, a resolution was sponsored petitioning Congress for the creation of the Municipality of Kitcharao.

The inhabitants of the municipality came from various regions in Luzon and the Visayas, hence the presence of Ilocanos, Tagalogs, Leyteños, Hiligaynons, Warays, Cebuanos, Boholanos, and indigenous people known as the Mamanwas.

On August 29, 1963, the first Municipal Officials were inducted to the office by then Governor Democrito Plaza. Félix Q. Basadre, Sr. was the appointed Mayor, Marceliano Morada as Vice Mayor and the councilors Mariano M. Napalan, Sr., Gaudencio Pojas, Pencionico Bermúdez, Juan Tidalgo, Agustín Patagan and Uldarico Atuel.

The same set of Municipal Officials was elected in the ensuing regular election in November 1963.

In 2005, Barangays Crossing and Songkoy were created.

== Geography ==
According to the Philippine Statistics Authority, the municipality has a land area of 171.92 square kilometres (66.38 sq mi) constituting 6.30% of the 2,730.24-square-kilometre- (1,054.15 sq mi) total area of Agusan del Norte.

=== Climate ===
Climate data for Kitcharao, Agusan del Norte
Month	Jan	Feb	Mar	Apr	May	Jun	Jul	Aug	Sep	Oct	Nov	Dec	Year
Mean daily maximum °C (°F)	27 (81)	27 (81)	28 (82)	29 (84)	30 (86)	29 (84)	29 (84)	29 (84)	29 (84)	29 (84)	28 (82)	28 (82)	29 (83)
Mean daily minimum °C (°F)	23 (73)	23 (73)	23 (73)	23 (73)	24 (75)	25 (77)	24 (75)	24 (75)	24 (75)	24 (75)	24 (75)	23 (73)	24 (74)
Average precipitation mm (inches)	210 (8.3)	161 (6.3)	123 (4.8)	85 (3.3)	148 (5.8)	186 (7.3)	164 (6.5)	157 (6.2)	141 (5.6)	190 (7.5)	223 (8.8)	200 (7.9)	1,988 (78.3)
Average rainy days	21.0	16.8	18.5	18.2	24.9	27.7	28.4	27.0	26.1	27.6	24.6	22.0	282.8
Source: Meteoblue

=== Barangays ===
Kitcharao is politically subdivided into 11 barangays. Each barangay consists of puroks while some have sitios.

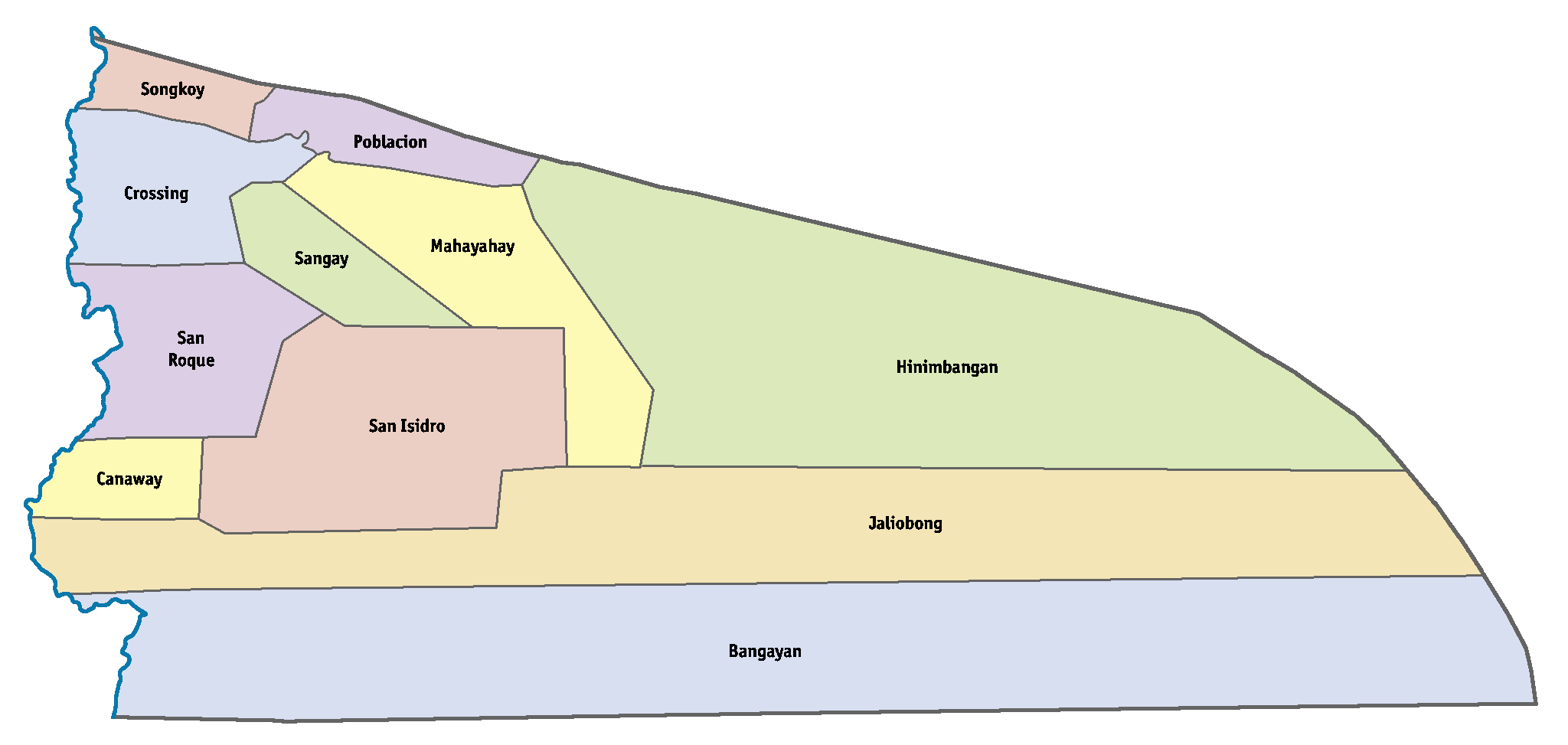
Political map of Kitcharao

PSGC	Barangay	Population			±% p.a.	
		2024		2010		
160206001	Bangayan	5.5%	1,254	1,134	▴	0.70%
160206002	Canaway	5.6%	1,259	1,183	▴	0.43%
160206010	Crossing	14.4%	3,274	3,103	▴	0.37%
160206003	Hinimbangan	1.3%	299	458	▾	−2.90%
160206004	Jaliobong	6.8%	1,551	1,755	▾	−0.85%
160206005	Mahayahay	11.6%	2,632	2,290	▴	0.97%
160206006	Poblacion	9.7%	2,198	1,882	▴	1.08%
160206007	San Isidro	5.4%	1,227	1,067	▴	0.97%
160206008	San Roque	8.6%	1,947	1,785	▴	0.60%
160206009	Sangay	4.6%	1,038	903	▴	0.97%
160206011	Songkoy	8.7%	1,980	1,817	▴	0.60%
	Total		22,671	17,377	▴	1.85%

== Demographics ==
Population census of Kitcharao
Year	Pop.	±% p.a.
1970	9,960	—
1975	10,524	+1.11%
1980	11,785	+2.29%
1990	13,598	+1.44%
1995	14,679	+1.44%
2000	15,950	+1.80%
2007	21,426	+4.15%
2010	17,377	−7.34%
2015	18,659	+1.36%
2020	21,278	+2.80%
2024	22,671	+1.53%
Source: Philippine Statistics Authority

In the 2024 census, Kitcharao had a population of 22,671. The population density was 130 inhabitants per square kilometre (340/sq mi).

== Economy ==
Poverty incidence of Kitcharao (%)

Source: Philippine Statistics Authority

== Transportation ==
The Kitcharao Land Transport Terminal serves multicabs, buses, vans and jeepneys bound for Butuan/Surigao.
