= Magallanes, Agusan del Norte =

Municipality in Agusan del Norte, Philippines

Magallanes
- Municipality
- Municipality of Magallanes
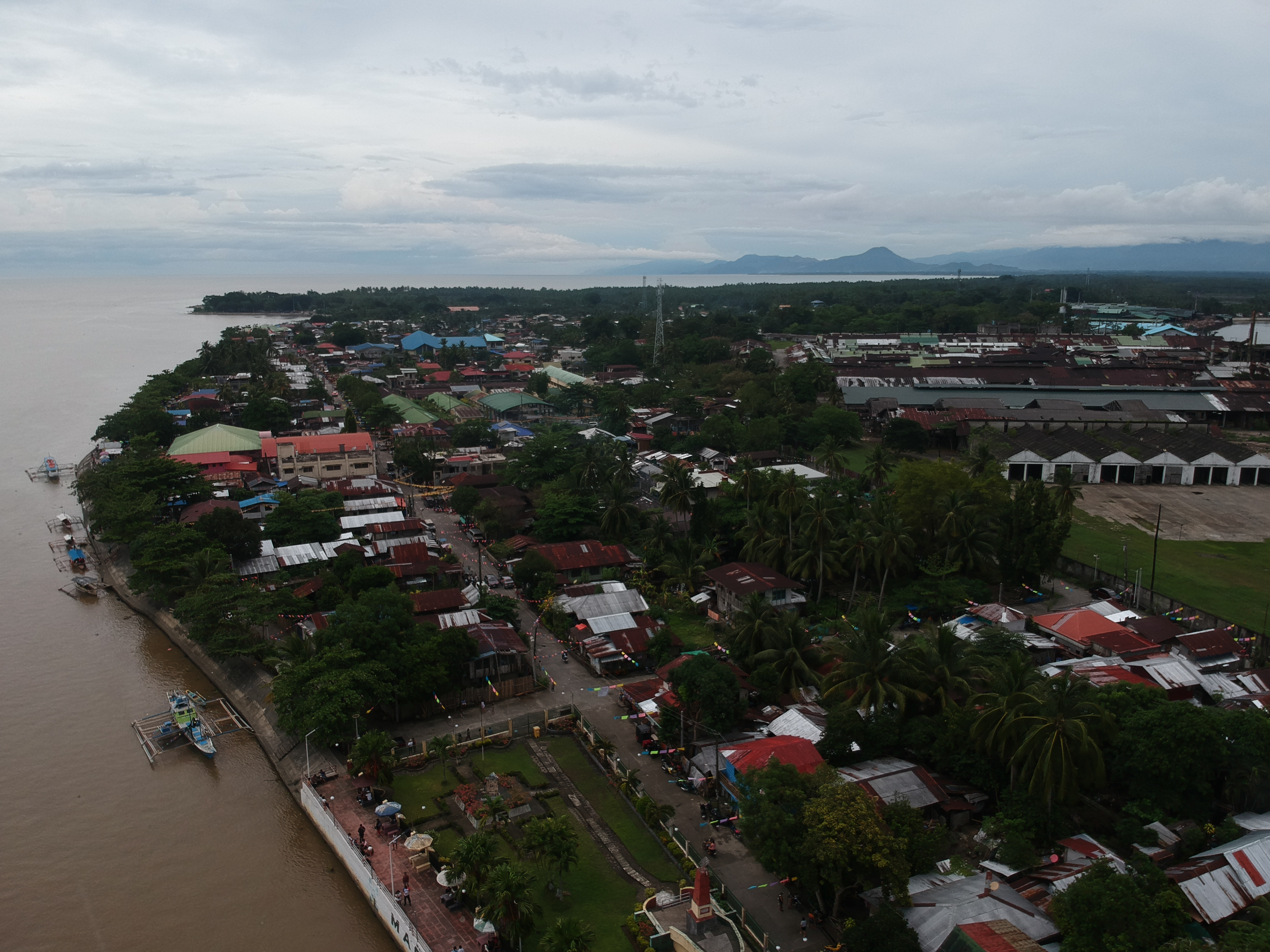
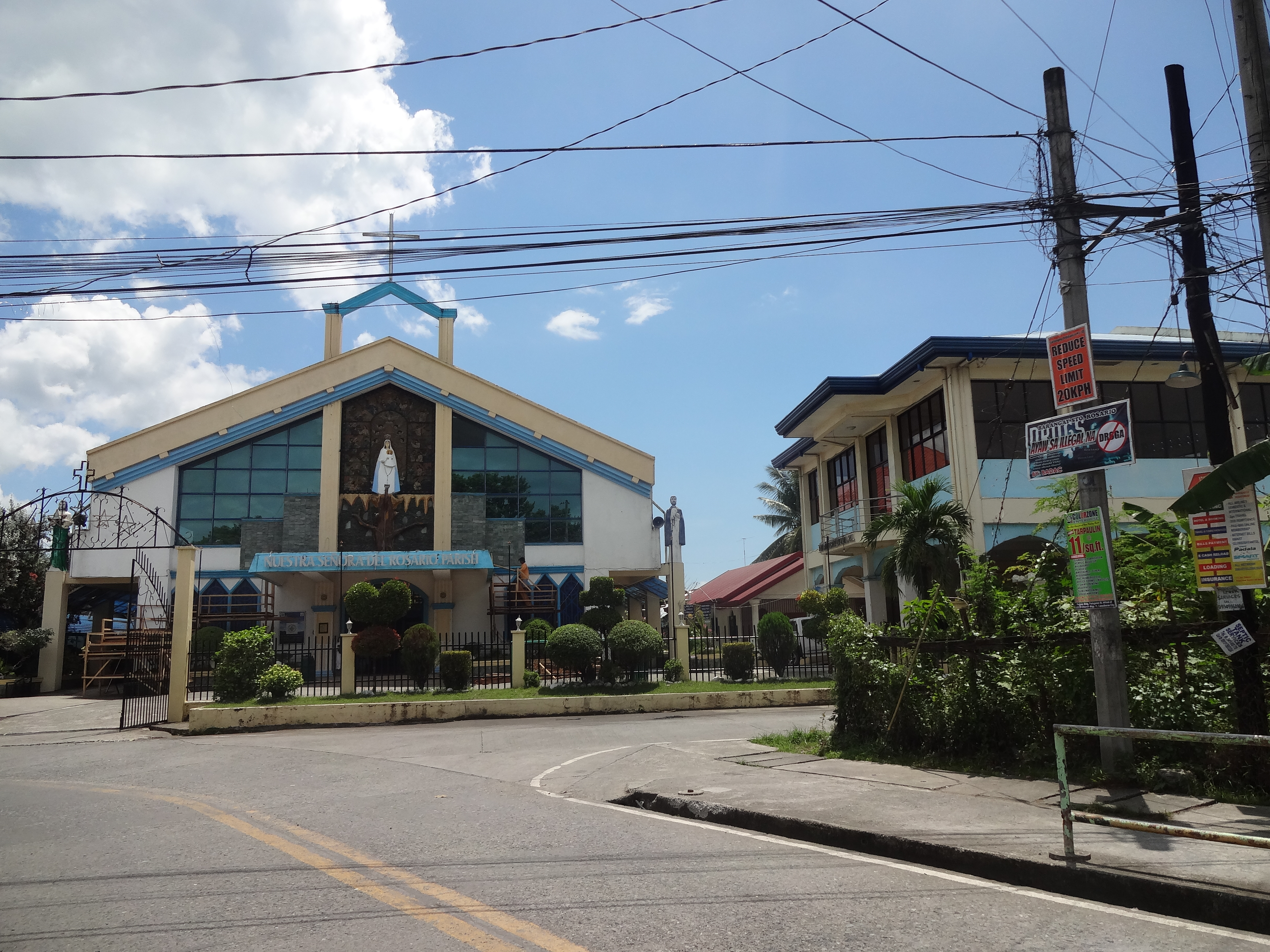
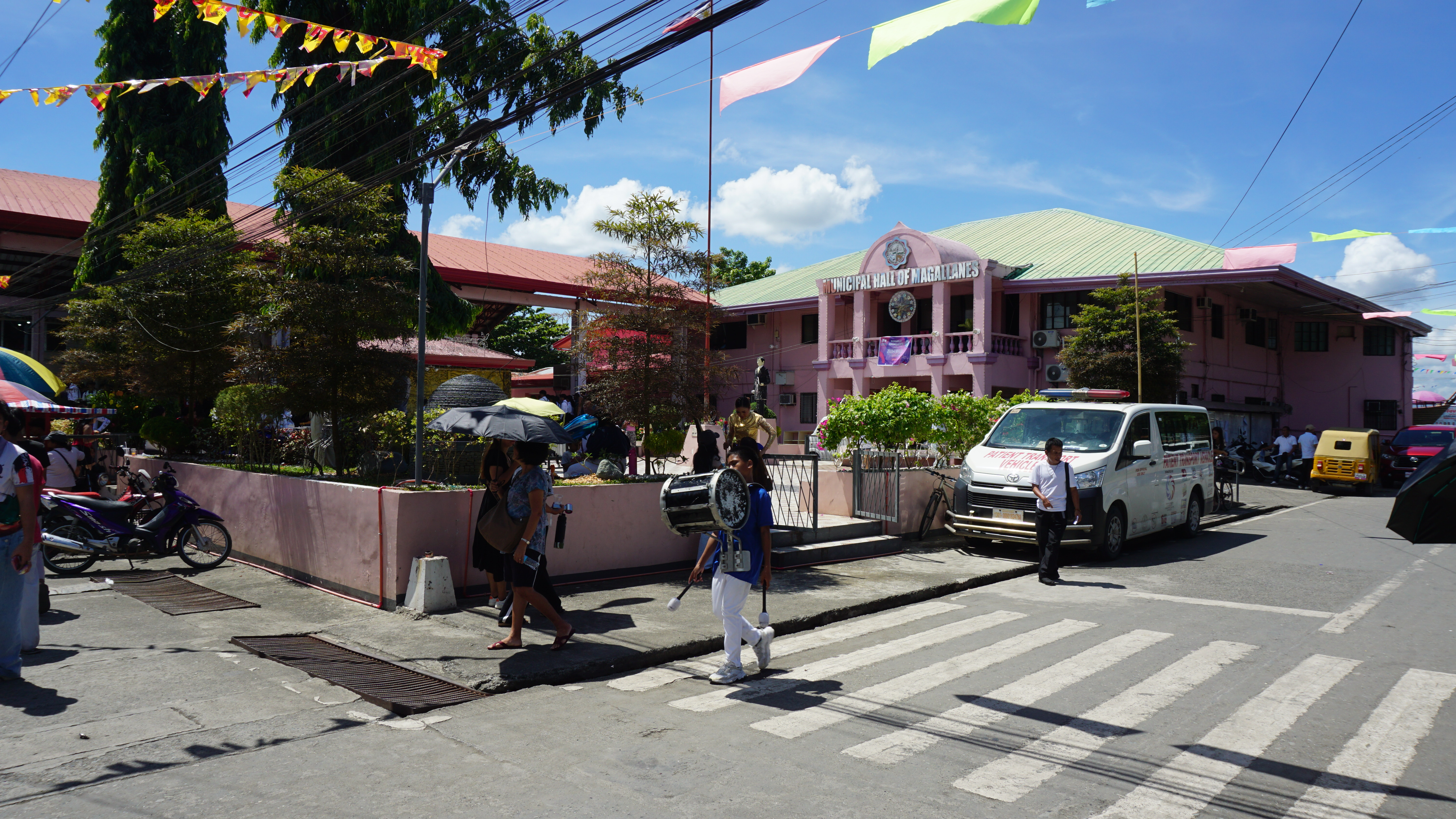
- From top, left to right: Aerial view; Nuestra Senora del Rosario Parish; Municipal and SB Hall

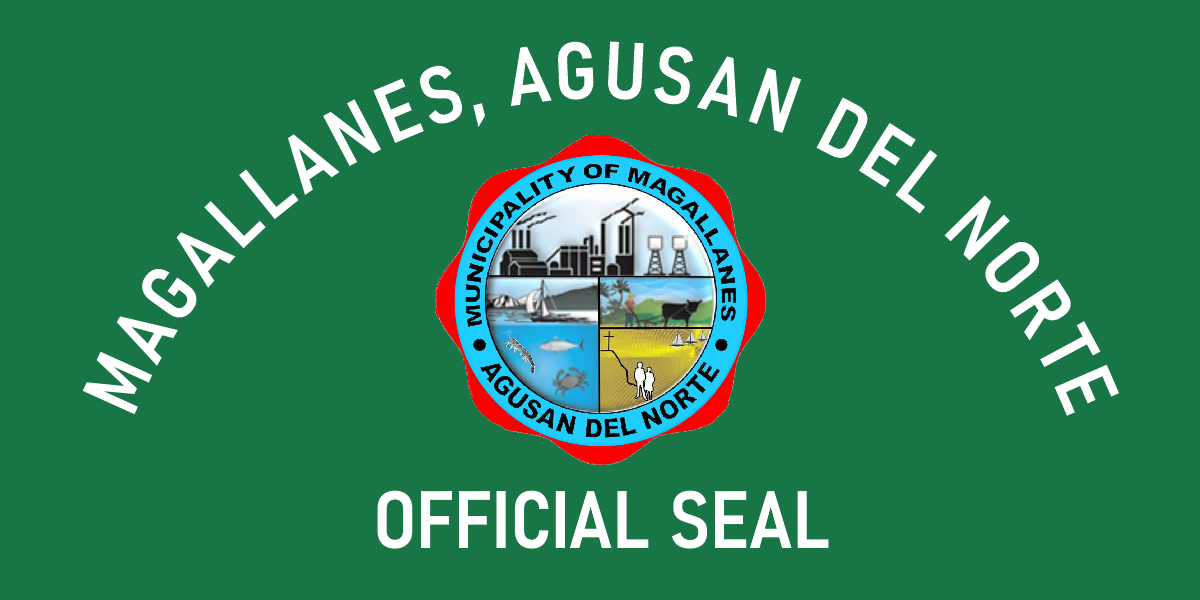
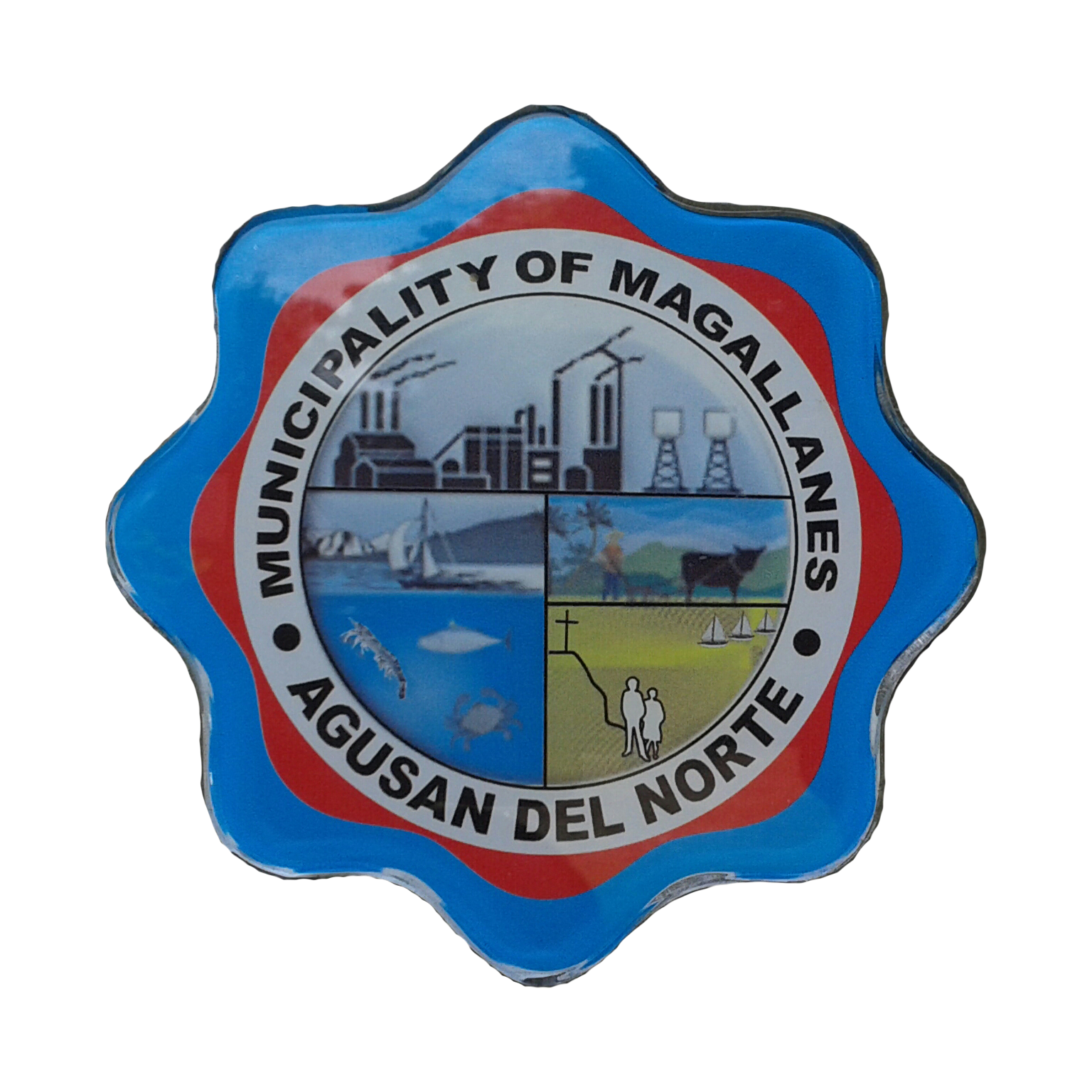
- Flag Seal

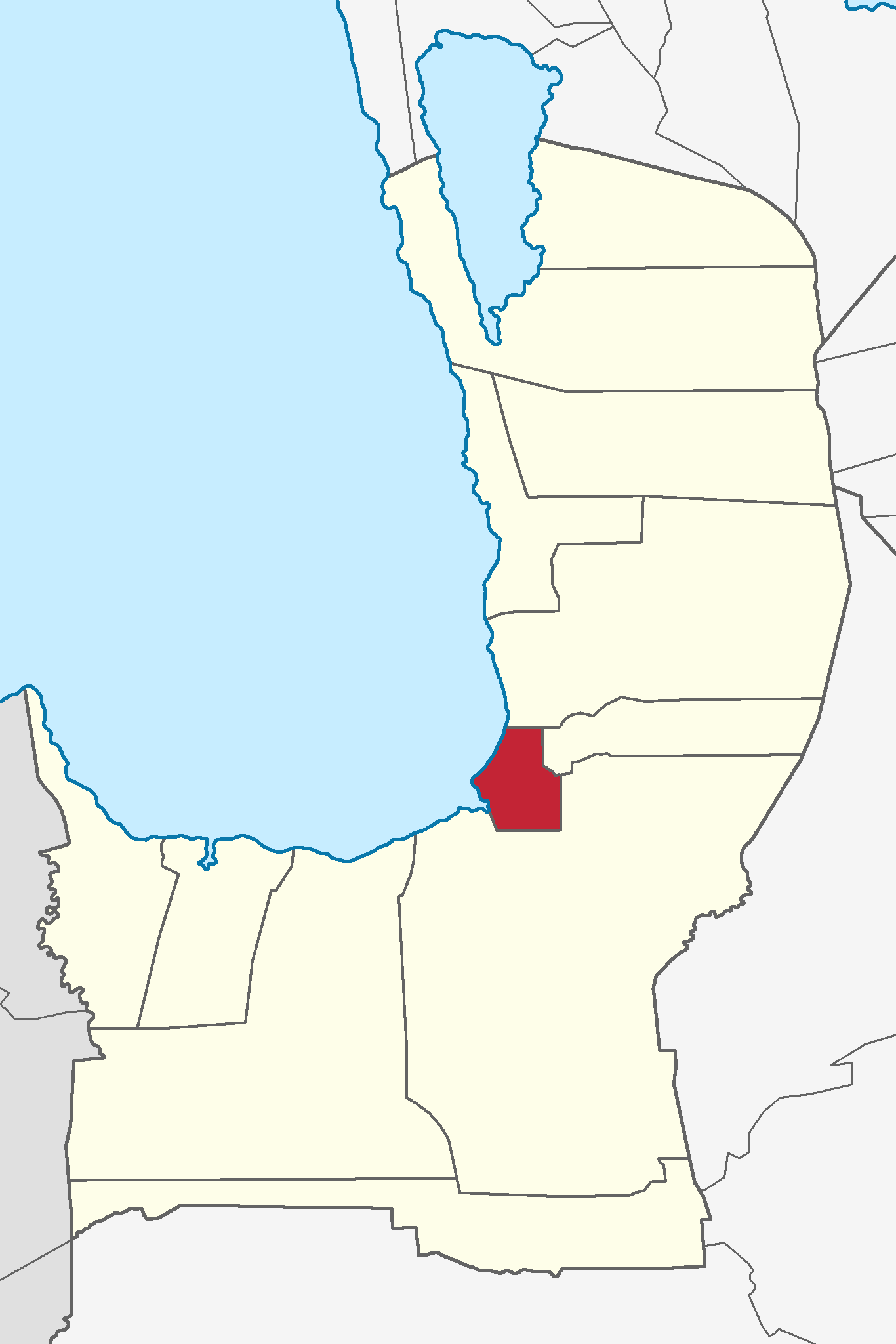
- Map of Agusan del Norte with Magallanes highlighted
- Interactive map of Magallanes
- Location within the Philippines
- Coordinates: 9°01′N 125°31′E
- Country: Philippines
- Region: Caraga
- Province: Agusan del Norte
- District: Lone district
- Founded: 21 June 1969
- Named for: Hispanized surname of Ferdinand Magellan
- Barangays: 8 (see Barangays)

Government
  - Type: Sangguniang Bayan
  - Mayor: Cesar C. Cumba
  - Vice Mayor: Meriam Pagaran
  - Representative: Dale Corvera
  - Municipal Council: Members: Martina A. Castrodes; Diomiel A. Basnig; Rolando C. Dapar; Marilou M. Cumba; Meriam G. Pagaran; Leah Georgette B. Amodia; Amanoden A. Mulok; James M. dela Fuerta Sr.
  - Electorate: 16,517 voters (2025)

Area
  - Total: 44.31 km^{2} (17.11 sq mi)
- Elevation: 5.0 m (16.4 ft)
- Highest elevation: 134 m (440 ft)
- Lowest elevation: −2 m (−6.6 ft)

Population (2024 census)
  - Total: 22,780
  - Density: 514.1/km^{2} (1,332/sq mi)
  - Households: 5,174

Economy
  - Income class: 4th municipal income class
  - Poverty incidence: 18.82% (2023)
  - Revenue: ₱ 139.6 million (2024)
  - Assets: ₱ 431 million (2024)
  - Expenditure: ₱ 137.3 million (2024)
  - Liabilities: ₱ 71.19 million (2024)

Service provider
  - Electricity: Agusan del Norte Electric Cooperative (ANECO)
- Time zone: UTC+8 (PST)
- ZIP code: 8604
- PSGC: 1600208000
- IDD : area code: +63 (0)85
- Native languages: Agusan; Butuanon; Cebuano; Higaonon; Tagalog
- Website: www.magallanesadn.gov.ph

Magallanes, officially the Municipality of Magallanes (Cebuano: Lungsod sa Magallanes; Tagalog: Bayan ng Magallanes), is a municipality in the province of Agusan del Norte, Philippines. According to the 2024 census, it has a population of 22,780 people.

The municipality was named after the Hispanized surname of the Portuguese-born maritime explorer Ferdinand Magellan. Formerly part of Butuan, Magallanes was created as a municipality on June 21, 1969, through Republic Act 5660.

== Geography ==
According to the Philippine Statistics Authority, the municipality has a land area of 44.31 square kilometres (17.11 sq mi) constituting 1.62% of the 2,730.24-square-kilometre- (1,054.15 sq mi) total area of Agusan del Norte.

The topography of the land is mostly flat and rolling, surrounded by mountains. Swamps characterize much of the landscape that is situated at the mouth of the two major rivers in the province, the Agusan and Baug Rivers.

The elevation of most of lands is 2 feet (0.61 m) below sea level. The town center is in the river delta and has to be kept protected by dikes. The land gradually rises in the north-west to the 99-metre- (325 ft) high Mount Taod-oy at barangay Taod-oy and the 162-metre- (531 ft) high Mount Panaytayon.

Around 2,834.89 hectares (7,005.2 acres) of Magallanes lands have slope of 0 to 3 percent, 399.28 hectares (986.6 acres) have 8 to 18 percent, 1,497.30 hectares (3,699.9 acres) 18 to 30 percent and 250.53 hectares (619.1 acres) 30 to 50 percent.

Hydrosol, San Miguel Loam, San Miguel Clay Loam, Malalag Silt Loam and Butuan Loam are its soil types. Upper Miocene, Cretaceous-Paleogene and recent sedimentary materials are the rock elements that make up Magallanes lands.

=== Land use ===
Of its total land area, 4,109 hectares (10,150 acres) are classified as alienable and disposable. The other 882 hectares (2,180 acres) are forestlands. 149.95 hectares (370.5 acres) or 3 percent is built-up, 92.26 hectares (228.0 acres) of that for social facilities and the other 59.69 hectares (147.5 acres) for roads. Around 3,210.72 hectares (7,933.9 acres) or 64.33 percent of its lands are utilized for agriculture, the other 1,630.33 hectares (4,028.6 acres) or 33.20 percent, for forest use. Four hectares are also being utilized for tourism in special use. Within the agricultural area, 1,727.63 hectares (4,269.1 acres) are under CARP coverage.

=== Climate ===
Climate data for Magallanes, Agusan del Norte
Month	Jan	Feb	Mar	Apr	May	Jun	Jul	Aug	Sep	Oct	Nov	Dec	Year
Mean daily maximum °C (°F)	28 (82)	28 (82)	28 (82)	30 (86)	30 (86)	30 (86)	30 (86)	30 (86)	30 (86)	30 (86)	29 (84)	28 (82)	29 (85)
Mean daily minimum °C (°F)	23 (73)	23 (73)	23 (73)	23 (73)	24 (75)	25 (77)	24 (75)	25 (77)	25 (77)	24 (75)	24 (75)	24 (75)	24 (75)
Average precipitation mm (inches)	277 (10.9)	211 (8.3)	155 (6.1)	109 (4.3)	166 (6.5)	191 (7.5)	154 (6.1)	138 (5.4)	127 (5.0)	173 (6.8)	241 (9.5)	231 (9.1)	2,173 (85.5)
Average rainy days	22.7	19.1	20.0	19.9	25.9	27.6	27.6	26.1	25.1	26.8	24.3	23.2	288.3
Source: Meteoblue

Magallanes is generally outside the "typhoon belt". Its climate is, by Philippine classification, Type II. There is no definite dry season in the area. Maximum rain is from November to January. Lying within the eastern coast, the place is within the pathway north-east monsoons, trade winds and storms.

=== Barangays ===
Magallanes is politically subdivided into eight barangays. Each barangay consists of puroks while some have sitios.

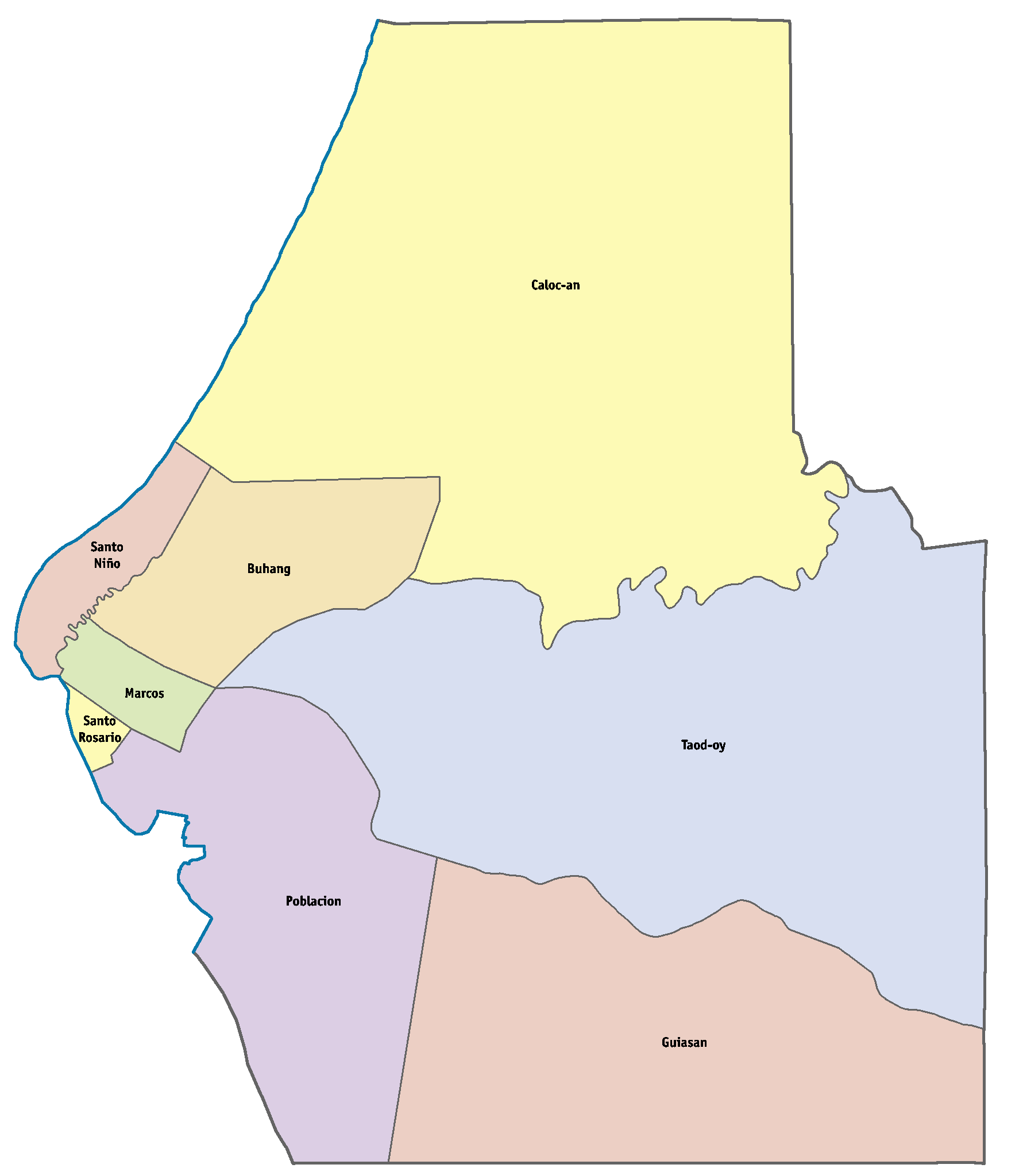
Political map of Magallanes

PSGC	Barangay	Population			±% p.a.	
		2024		2010		
160208001	Buhang	17.0%	3,878	4,021	▾	−0.25%
160208002	Caloc-an	19.2%	4,369	4,154	▴	0.35%
160208003	Guiasan	6.4%	1,467	1,166	▴	1.61%
160208009	Marcos	16.0%	3,639	3,824	▾	−0.34%
160208005	Poblacion	8.2%	1,876	1,930	▾	−0.20%
160208010	Santo Niño	7.3%	1,663	1,741	▾	−0.32%
160208011	Santo Rosario	12.1%	2,764	3,189	▾	−0.99%
160208008	Taod-oy	5.9%	1,351	1,456	▾	−0.52%
	Total		22,780	21,481	▴	0.41%

== Demographics ==
Population census of Magallanes
Year	Pop.	±% p.a.
1970	7,377	—
1975	11,412	+9.14%
1980	15,994	+6.98%
1990	16,211	+0.13%
1995	17,523	+1.47%
2000	19,895	+2.76%
2007	20,930	+0.70%
2010	21,481	+0.95%
2015	21,007	−0.42%
2020	22,293	+1.26%
2024	22,780	+0.52%
Source: Philippine Statistics Authority

In the 2024 census, Magallanes had a population of 22,780. The population density was 510 inhabitants per square kilometre (1,300/sq mi).

== Economy ==
Poverty incidence of Magallanes (%)

Source: Philippine Statistics Authority

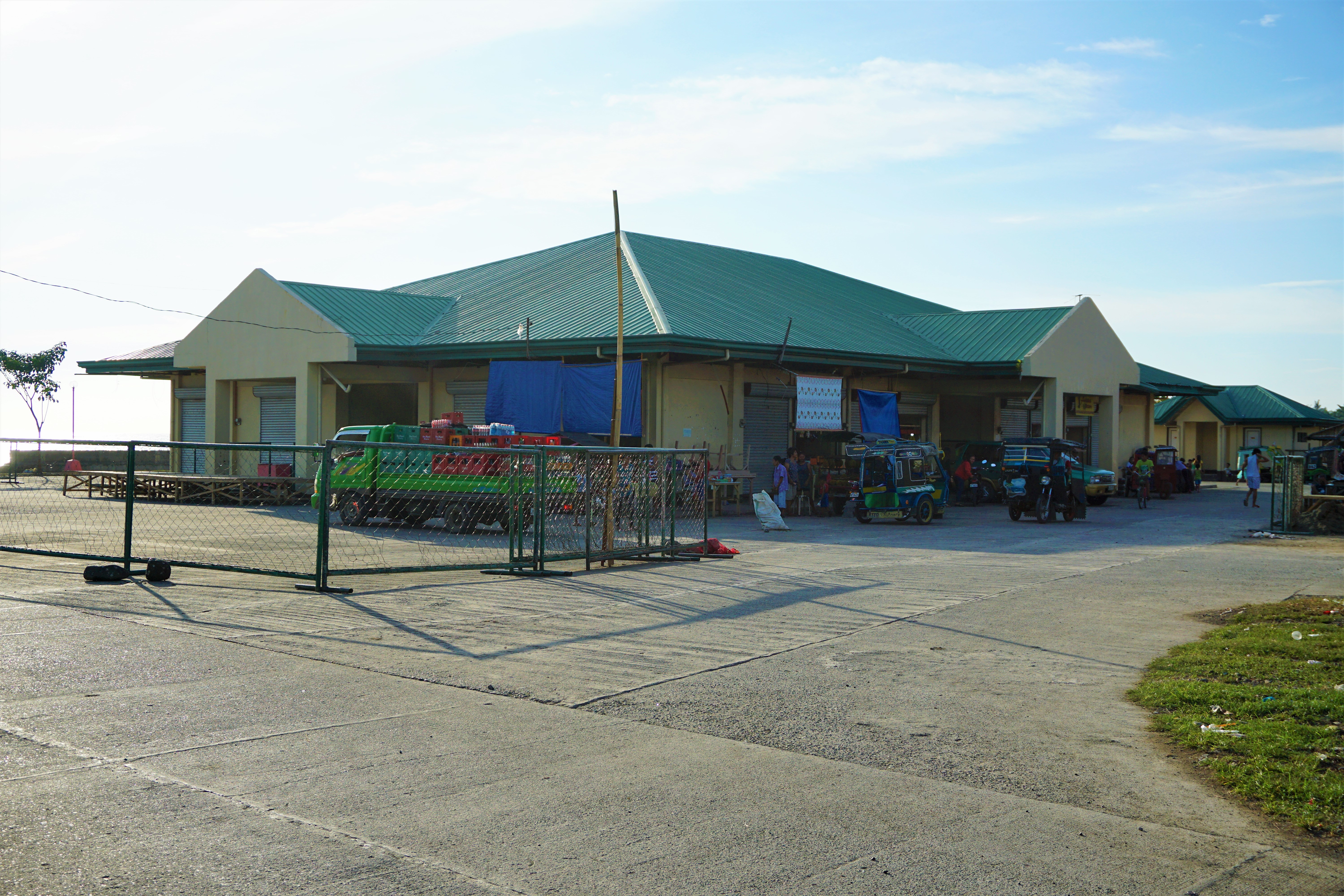
Public Market

The town has two plywood manufacturing firms: EMCO (Barangay Santo Rosario) and PSPI (Barangay Marcos), and one safety matches manufacturing firm: JAKA Equities Corp (Barangay Marcos). The three manufacturing plants are all on the main street and operating near the Baug River and Agusan River.

A 2,000-hectare (4,900-acre) of prawn/shrimp farm in Magallanes used to be the Philippines' top exporter of first class prawn/shrimp to Japan, until the entire farm was hit by a white spot disease in 2001 leading to the collapse of the industry.

== Tourism ==
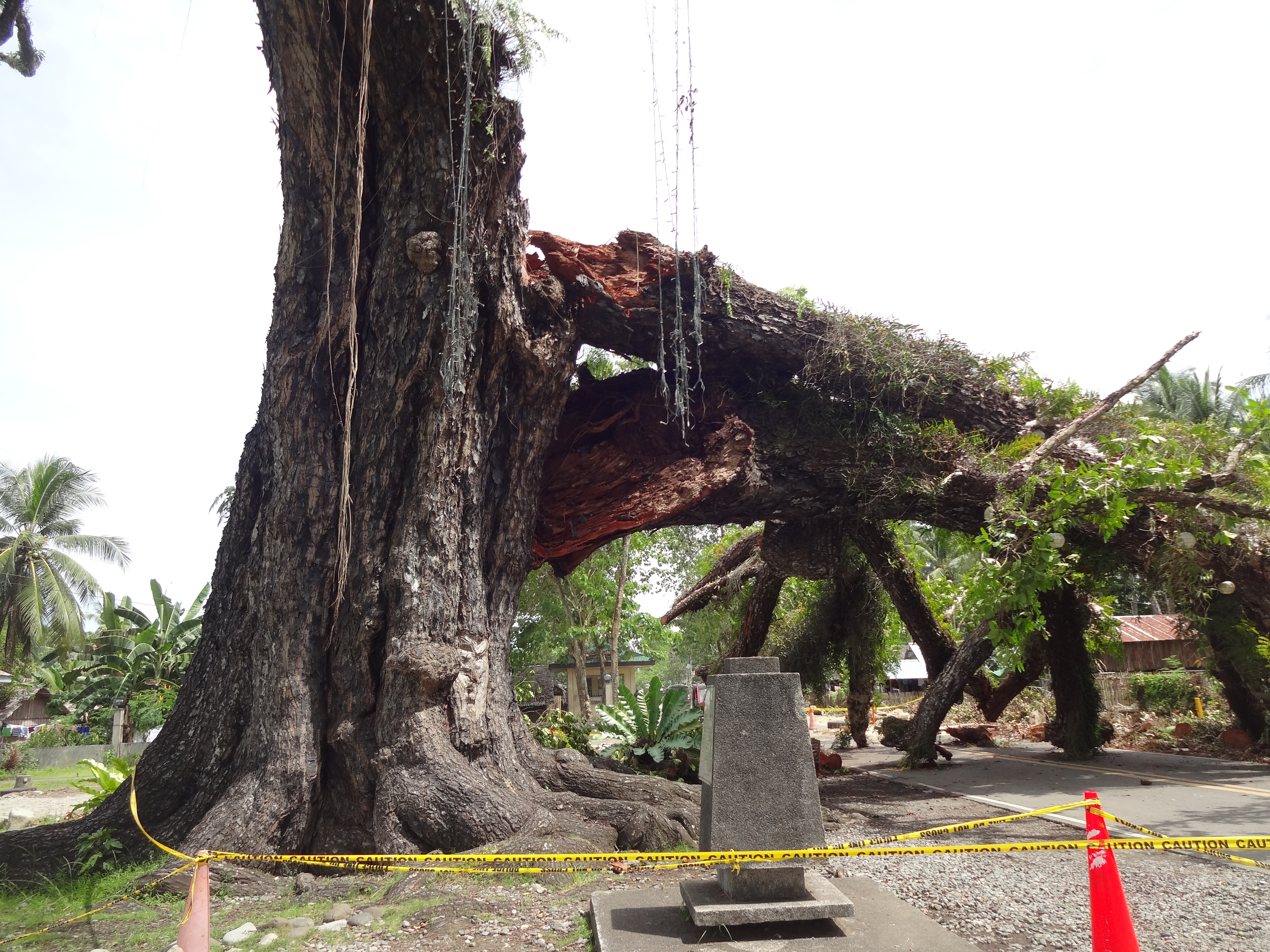
The large branches of the Bitaug was broke according to the residence near at the tree on June 23, 2017

Philippine Centennial Tree
The Department of Environment and Natural Resources (DENR) awarded Magallanes as the place that host the Oldest Tree (more than 500 years old) in the Philippines called Bitaug.

Lisagan Festival
Magallanes celebrates its annual fiesta every third Saturday of October in honor of patroness Nuestra Señora del Rosario, Our Lady of the Rosary, which includes thanksgiving mass, parades and more.
The 'Lisagan Festival' held on Sunday after the fiesta includes street dancing similar to Sinulog Festival and fluvial procession at the Agusan River and Baug River. The town parish doesn't allow major public gathering like disco, live bands and other similar events the night before the fiesta.

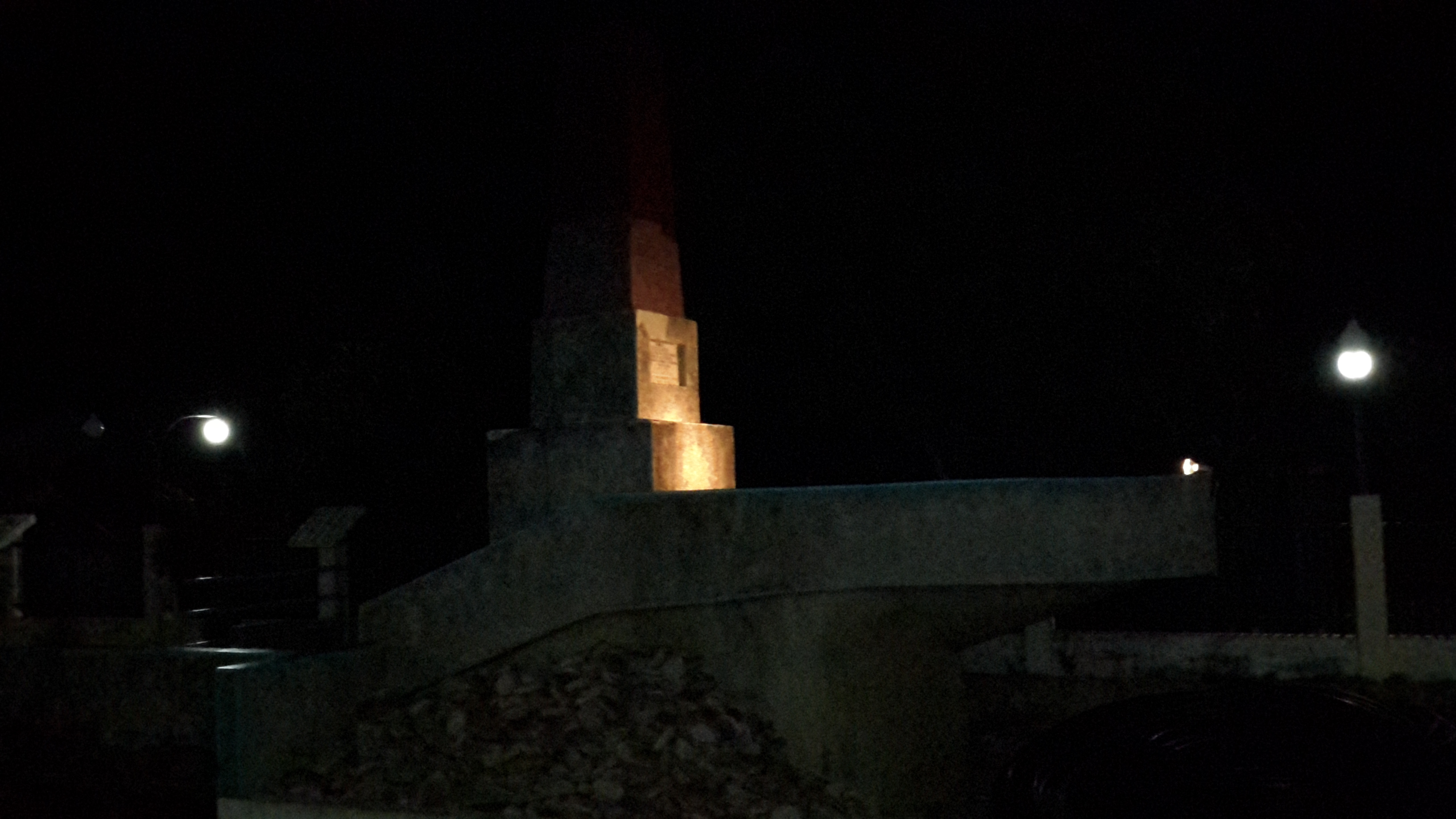
Magellan Shrine

Magellan Shrine
Located at Poblacion near the Municipal Hall, the shrine was the site of the 'first' Catholic mass in Mindanao on April 8, 1521. It was believed that the Magellan's Cross in Cebu was also erected here by the explorer Ferdinand Magellan and his men before they sail North. Evidence showed church ruins near the Agusan River.

Agusan River
The Agusan River is the widest and navigable river in Mindanao.

== Government ==
=== List of mayors ===
Name	Year of Term
Florentino P. Magallanes	1972-1978; 1986-1987
Francisco M. Herrera	1978-1984
Juanito A. Suacillo	1984-1986
Rosita C. Cumba	1988-1994; 1995
Manuel M. Relampagos	1994; 1995-1998
Carlito C. Cumba	2007-2010
Demosthenes H. Arabaca	2010-2019
Cesar C. Cumba	1998-2007; 2019–present

== Infrastructure ==
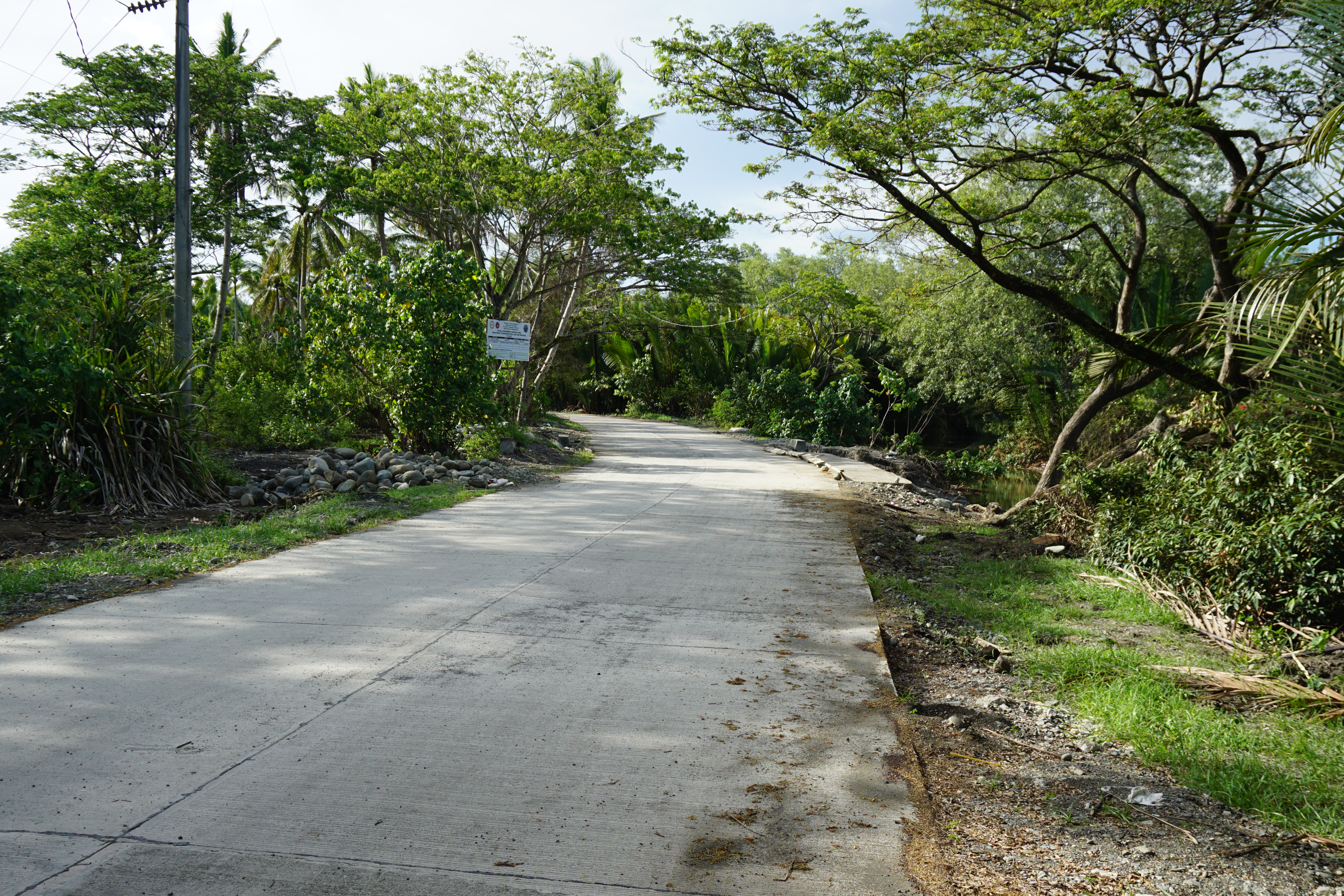
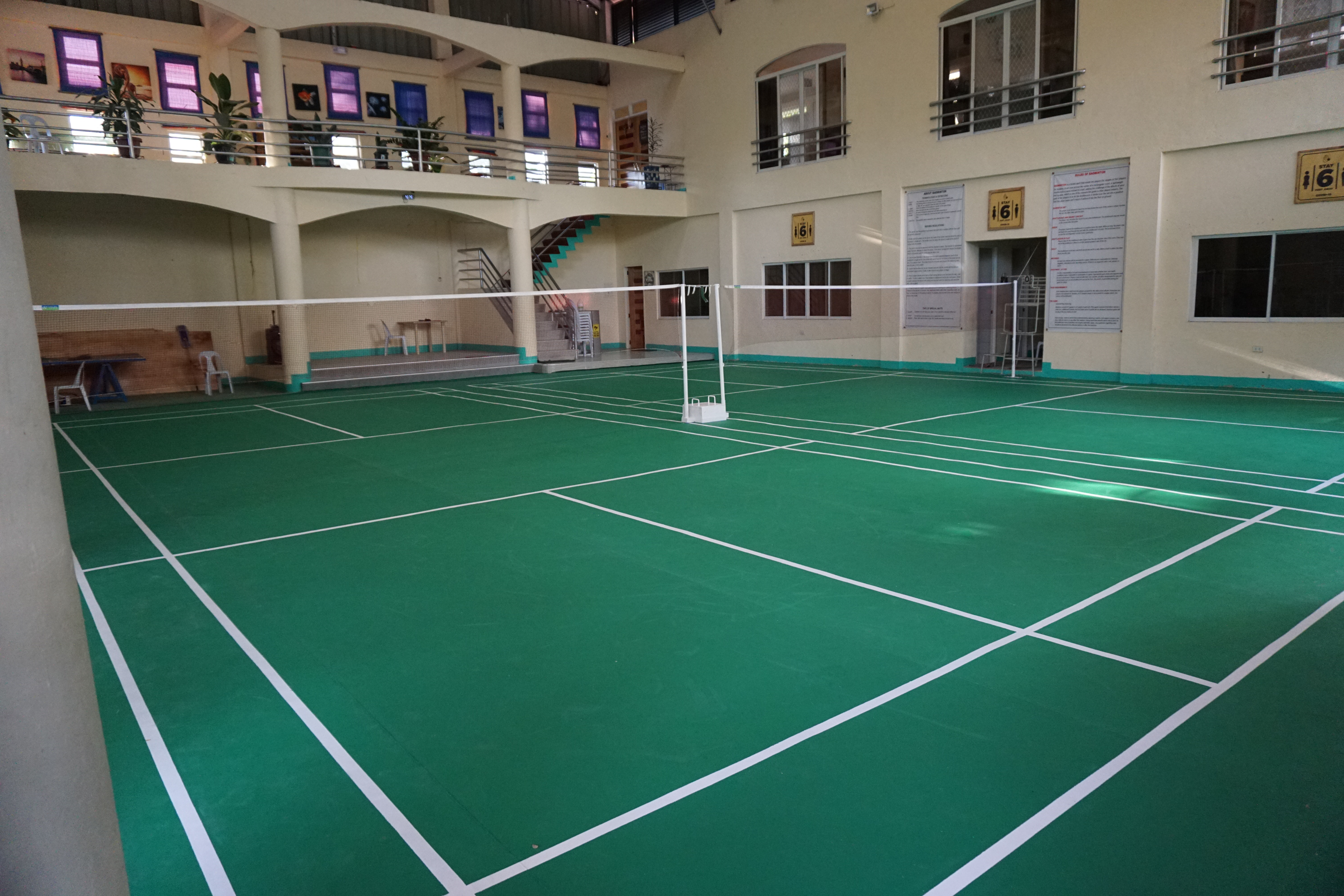
Magallanes Coastal Road (Left) and REBAR Sports Center (Right)

The Magallanes Coastal Road (Known as Cuenca Avenue Street) was started on 2019 under municipal mayor Cesar Cumba, Jr. The said project was under the Local Government and it was completed in October 2020. In 2023, the LGU constructs the new coastal boulevard that easily traveled from and to Poblacion. The REBAR Sports Center was located in P-6 Buhang, Magallanes which was opened on October 9, 2020. The said sports center was owned and maintained by the private family, and it has 2 badminton courts, 2 table tennis courts, 2 darts courts and the taekwondo dojang. The Badminton court can be also configured for Rhythmic gymnastics. In 2025, the LGU constructs a new Municipal Cultural and Sports Centre with the capacity of 2,000 people, currently under construction as of August 20, 2026.

=== Communications ===
The Philippine Long Distance Telephone Company provides fixed line services. Wireless mobile communications services are provided by Smart Communications and Globe Telecommunications.

=== Transportation ===
Magallanes can be reached through the Mindanao gateways:

==== Air ====
- Bancasi Airport of Butuan and Laguindingan International Airport of Cagayan de Oro and Iligan
- PAL Express and Cebu Pacific have daily flights from Manila to Butuan and v.v. Cebu-Butuan-Cebu flights via Cebu Pacific scheduled Mondays, Wednesdays and Saturdays, and PAL.

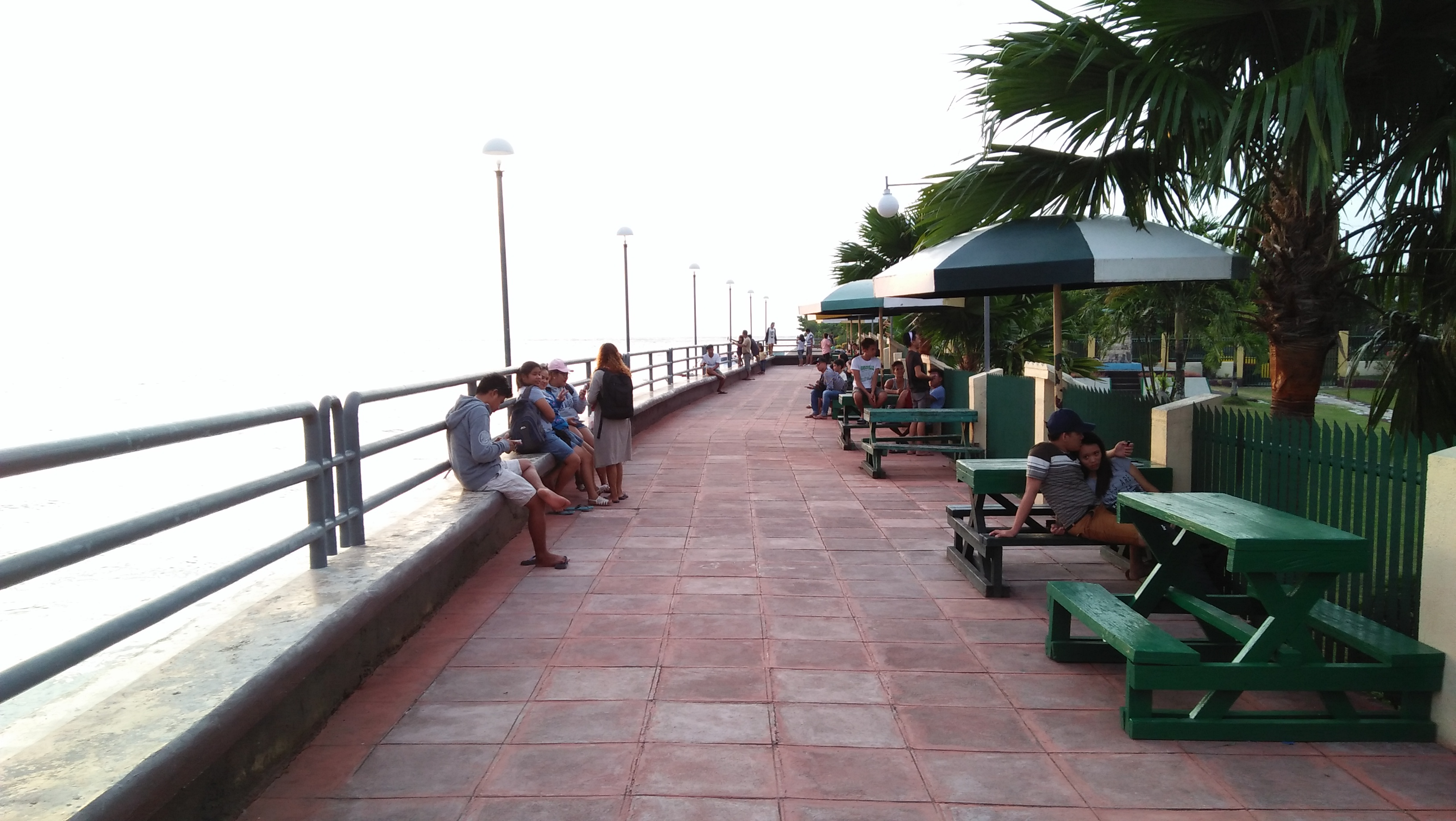
Magallanes Bay Walk

==== Sea ====
- Masao Port of Butuan
- Port of Nasipit
- Port of Surigao
- Macabalan Port of Cagayan de Oro

There are several major shipping lines serving the Manila and Cebu routes namely: 2GO Travel, Cokaliong, Trans-Asia Shipping Lines and Medallion Transport.

The boat ride from Butuan to Magallanes, navigating the Agusan River, takes about 45 minutes.

==== Land ====
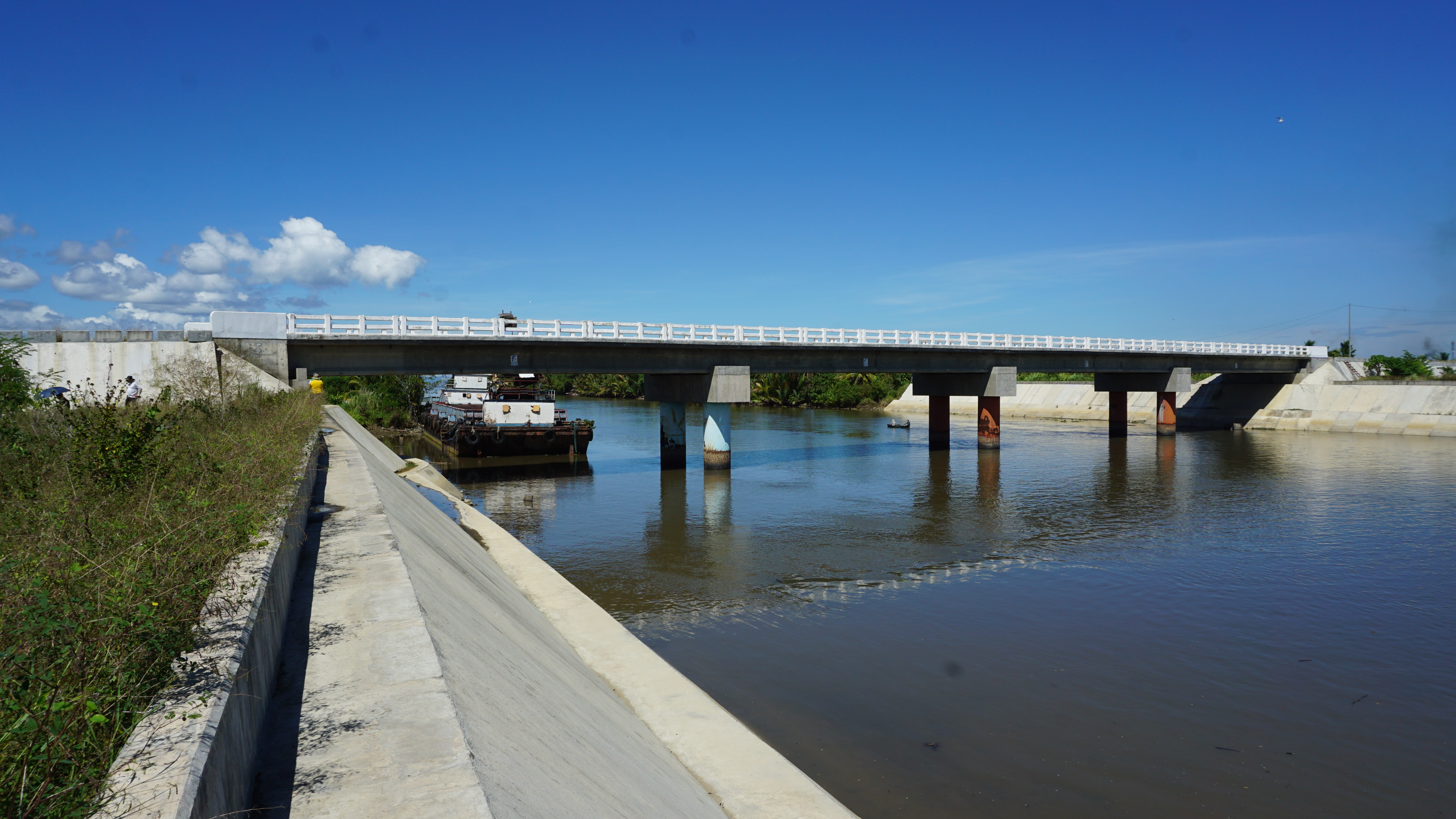
Guiasan Bridge

Bachelor Express and PhilTranCo is the dominant public land transport from Manila and Tacloban passing Surigao, Cabadbaran and Butuan to Cagayan de Oro and Davao. The public mode of transportation within the municipality is by motorcabs and pedicabs. Passenger vans commonly known as V-Hire are also available for Butuan routes.

== Notable people ==
- Ronald Barniso - international Taekwondo champion, first of municipality, globally
- RJ Rae Arquion - Taekwondo athlete, currently studied at NU
- Kyla Jane Langue - Chess athlete Gold Medalist representing Philippines for the 2025 ASEAN Para Games
