= Tubay =

Municipality in Agusan del Norte, Philippines

- Municipality
- Municipality of Tubay
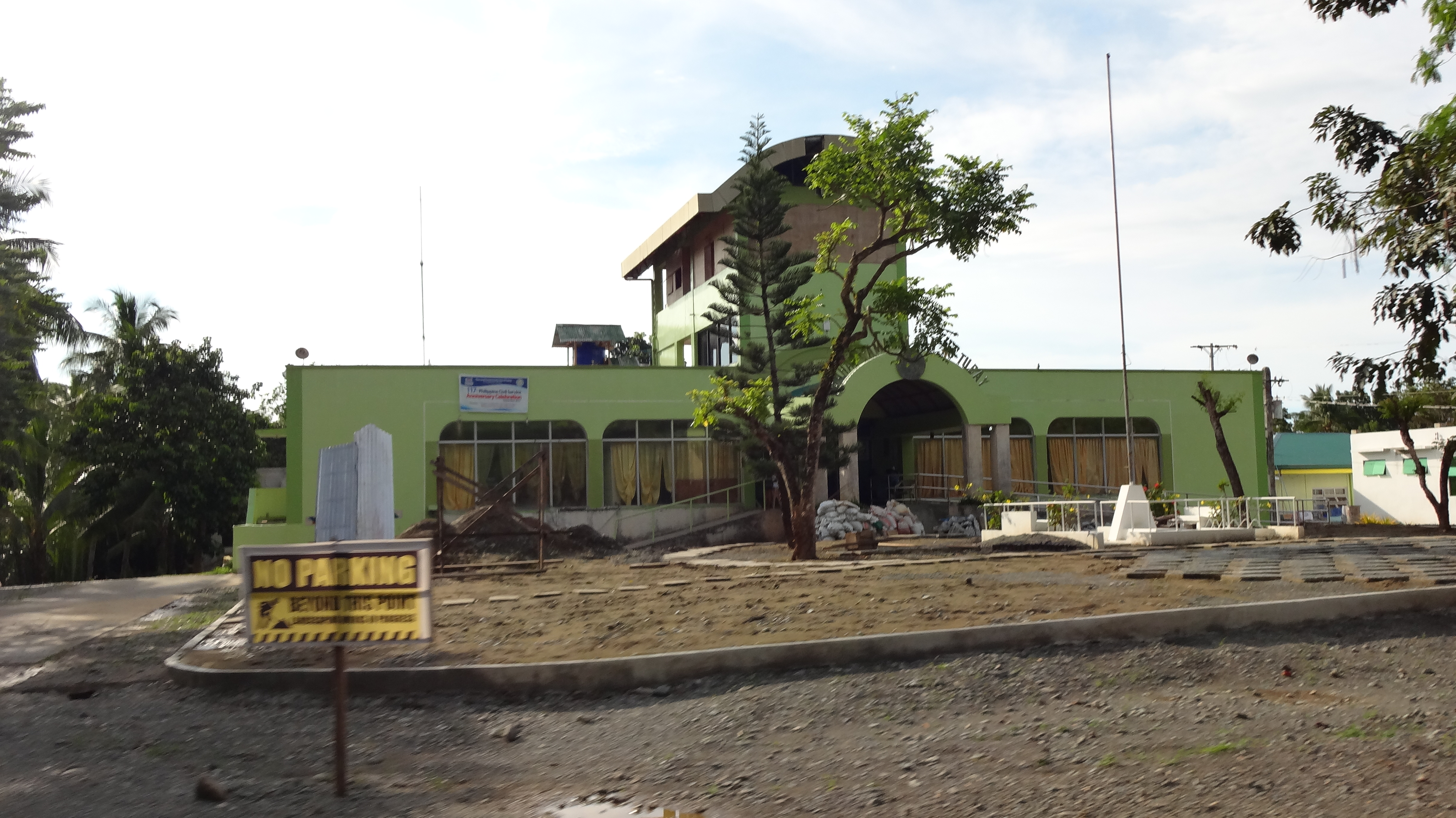
- Municipal Hall

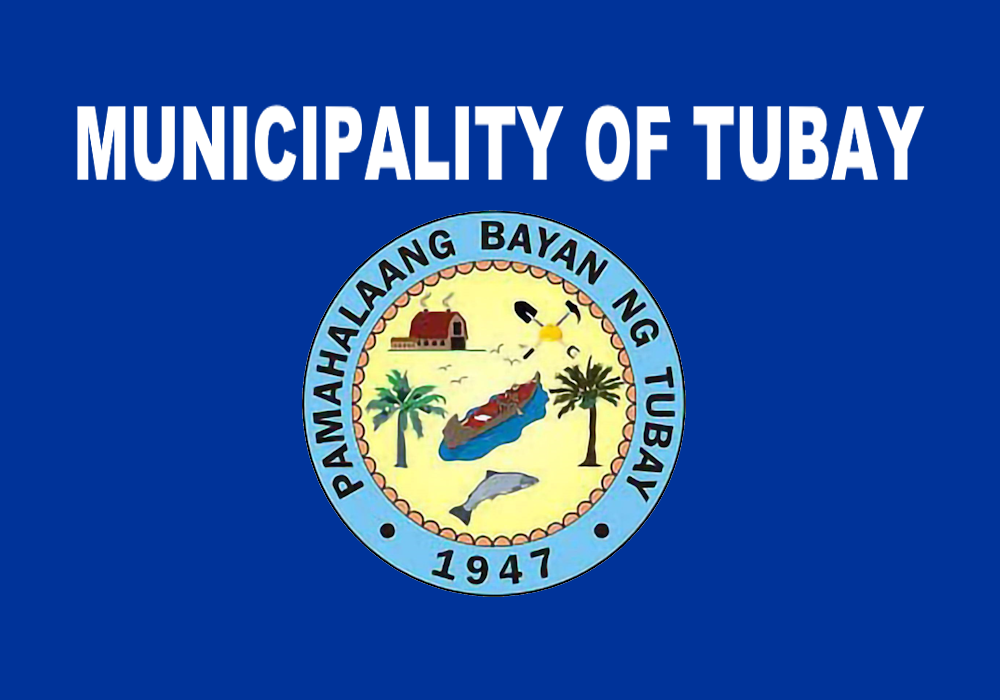
- Flag Seal

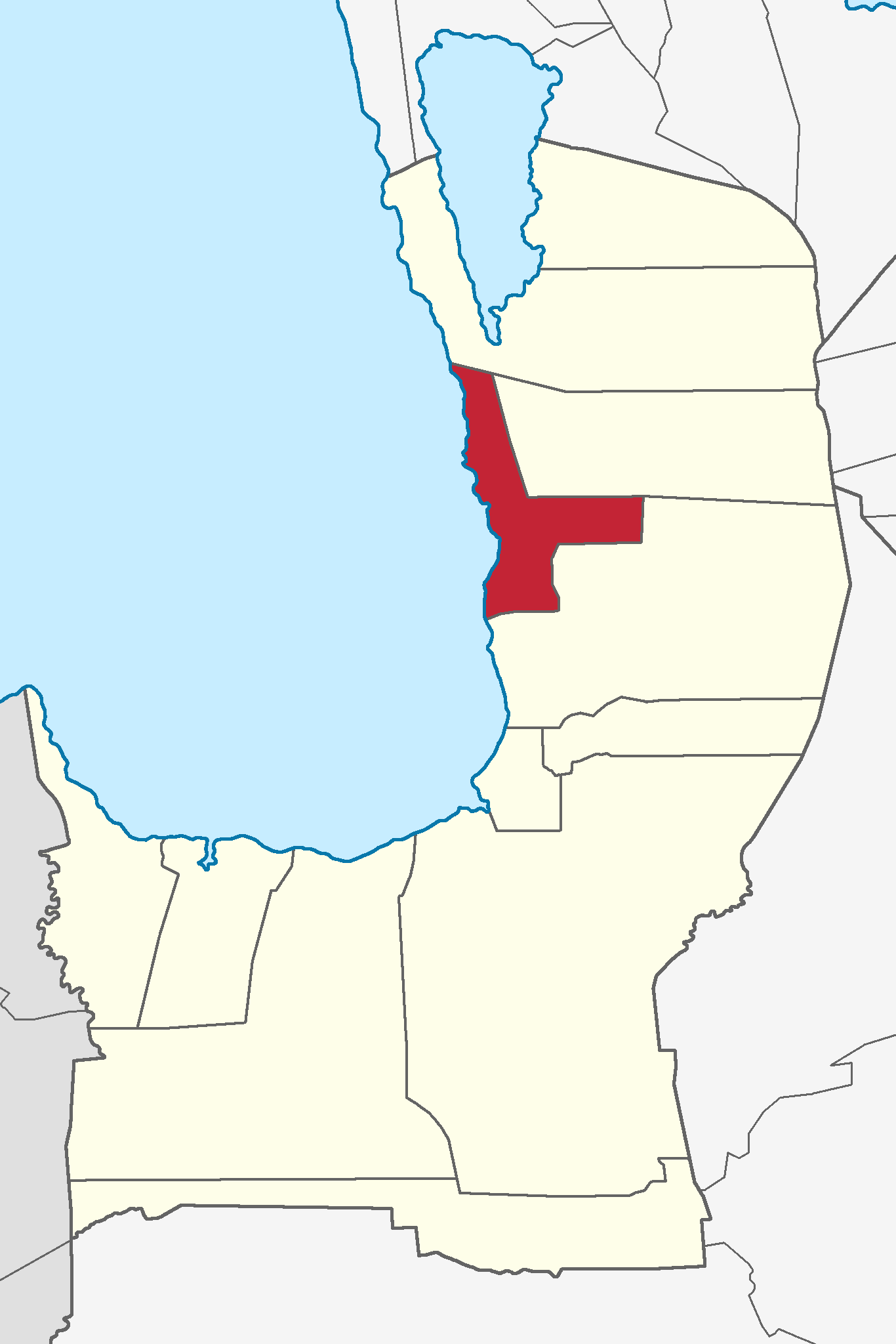
- Map of Agusan del Norte with Tubay highlighted
- Interactive map of Tubay
- Location within the Philippines
- Coordinates: 9°10′N 125°31′E
- Country: Philippines
- Region: Caraga
- Province: Agusan del Norte
- District: Lone district
- Barangays: 13 (see Barangays)

Government
  - Type: Sangguniang Bayan
  - Mayor: Engr Jimmy Luison Beray.
  - Vice Mayor: Michael Balite
  - Representative: Dale Corvera
  - Municipal Council: Members: Loreto L. Lapida.; Nilo Mordeno; Roselyn P. Simbajon.; JayMark Graven; Nelmar Mangmang; Teodulfo F. Cepeda; Giovani Pioco; Rosalina Guzo
  - Electorate: 22,257 voters (2025)

Area
  - Total: 138.09 km^{2} (53.32 sq mi)
- Elevation: 27 m (89 ft)
- Highest elevation: 457 m (1,499 ft)
- Lowest elevation: 0 m (0 ft)

Population (2024 census)
  - Total: 26,463
  - Density: 191.64/km^{2} (496.33/sq mi)
  - Households: 6,070

Economy
  - Income class: 1st municipal income class
  - Poverty incidence: 26.64% (2023)
  - Revenue: ₱ 208.4 million (2024)
  - Assets: ₱ 397.6 million (2024)
  - Expenditure: ₱ 111.1 million (2024)
  - Liabilities: ₱ 115.3 million (2024)

Service provider
  - Electricity: Agusan del Norte Electric Cooperative (ANECO)
- Time zone: UTC+8 (PST)
- ZIP code: 8606
- PSGC: 1600211000
- IDD : area code: +63 (0)85
- Native languages: Agusan; Butuanon; Cebuano; Higaonon; Tagalog
- Website: tubayagusan.wordpress.com

Tubay, officially the Municipality of Tubay (Cebuano: Lungsod sa Tubay; Tagalog: Bayan ng Tubay), is a 1st Class municipality in the province of Agusan del Norte, Philippines. According to the 2024 census, it has a population of 26,463 people.

It was created from the barrios of Tubay, La Fraternidad, Tinigbasan, Cabayawa, Victory, Santa Ana, and Tagmamarcay of the municipality of Cabadbaran in 1947, through Republic Act No. 188.

== History ==
The town of Tubay is named after its legendary founder Datu Tabay, and lays claim to being the second Spanish Settlement in Agusan and was known as a pueblo as early as 1751. Formerly, the people settled in the wilderness of Ilihan, then transferred to sitio Malabog and later to Tubay-Tubay and Sabang near the mouth of the Jabonga River. However, the danger of constant inundation and Moro attacks convinced the succeeding leader of the place to move the pueblo to Daang Lungsod where the massive magkuno post of once spacious and strongly built church now stand. It was here where the settlement firmly took place.

By 1898, Tubay had developed into a prosperous town. However, following American occupation, officials determined that neighboring Cabadbaran was more suitable as the seat of government. As a result, in 1903, Tubay was reduced to the status of a barrio in favor of Cabadbaran. Despite this change, Tubay remained an active commercial center, largely due to the presence of Chinese merchants. Economic activity continued into the 1920s, when the navigable Jabonga River served as the main route for the transport of copra and hemp. However, the completion of the Tubay–Santiago–Cabadbaran road led to a decline in river-based trade, causing a gradual downturn in Tubay’s commercial prominence.

On June 22, 1947, Tubay officially became a municipality when the Congress of the Philippines enacted Republic Act No. 188 which separated the barrios of Tubay, La Fraternidad, Tinigbasan, Cabayawa, Victory, Santa Ana, and Tagmamarcay, all from Cabadbaran, and constituted into the newly created town. By virtue of said law, President Manuel Roxas issued Presidential Proclamation No. 44 on October 20, 1947, thus making Tubay regain its township status.

== Geography ==
According to the Philippine Statistics Authority, the municipality has a land area of 138.09 square kilometres (53.32 sq mi) constituting 5.06% of the 2,730.24-square-kilometre- (1,054.15 sq mi) total area of Agusan del Norte.

=== Climate ===
Climate data for Tubay, Agusan del Norte
Month	Jan	Feb	Mar	Apr	May	Jun	Jul	Aug	Sep	Oct	Nov	Dec	Year
Mean daily maximum °C (°F)	27 (81)	28 (82)	28 (82)	30 (86)	30 (86)	30 (86)	30 (86)	30 (86)	30 (86)	30 (86)	29 (84)	28 (82)	29 (84)
Mean daily minimum °C (°F)	23 (73)	23 (73)	23 (73)	23 (73)	24 (75)	25 (77)	24 (75)	25 (77)	25 (77)	24 (75)	24 (75)	24 (75)	24 (75)
Average precipitation mm (inches)	210 (8.3)	161 (6.3)	123 (4.8)	85 (3.3)	148 (5.8)	186 (7.3)	164 (6.5)	157 (6.2)	141 (5.6)	190 (7.5)	223 (8.8)	200 (7.9)	1,988 (78.3)
Average rainy days	21.0	16.8	18.5	18.2	24.9	27.7	28.4	27.0	26.1	27.6	24.6	22.0	282.8
Source: Meteoblue

=== Barangays ===
Tubay is politically subdivided into 13 barangays. Each barangay consists of puroks, while some have sitios.

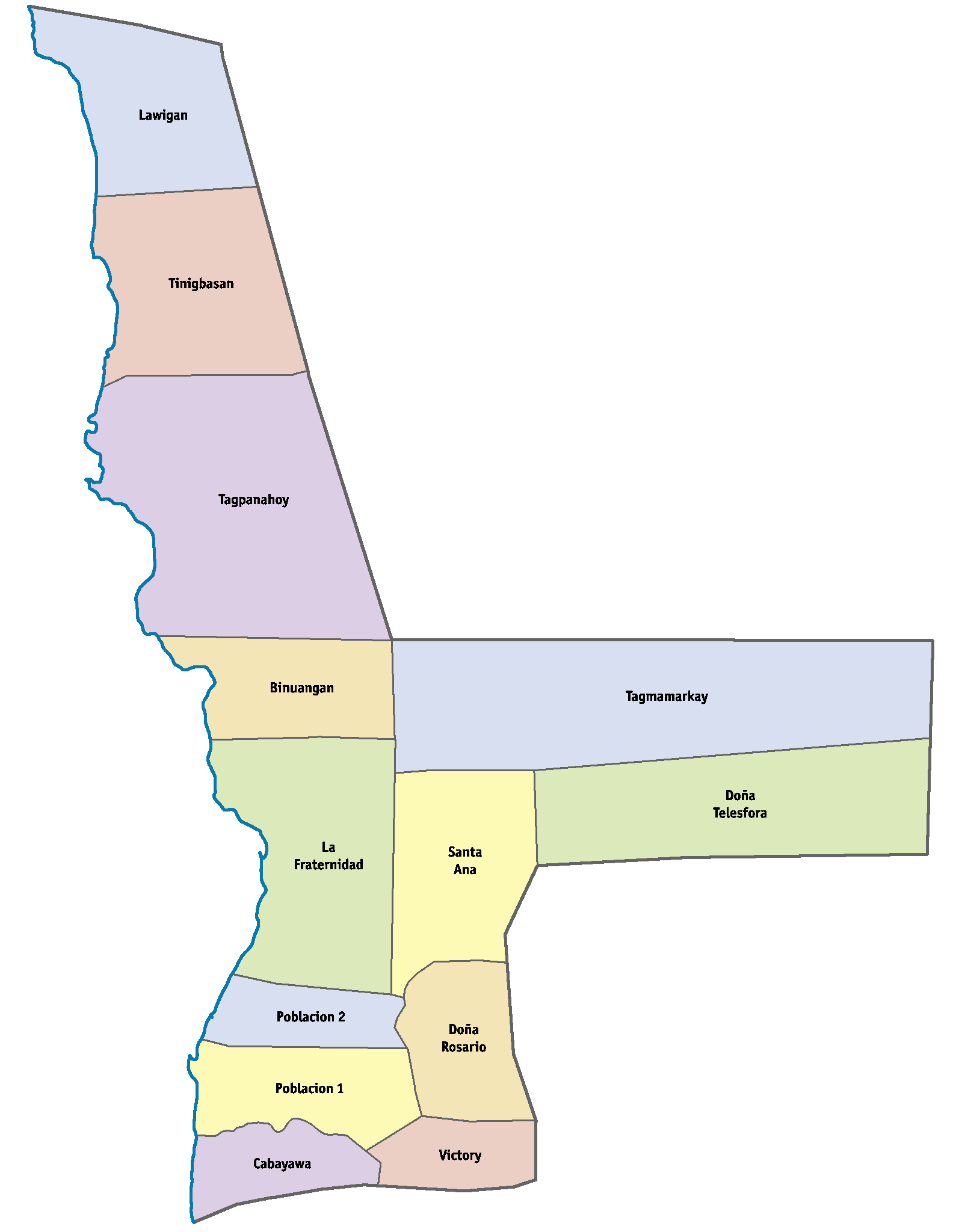
Political map of Tubay

PSGC	Barangay	Population			±% p.a.	
		2024		2010		
160211001	Binuangan	5.2%	1,372	1,139	▴	1.30%
160211002	Cabayawa	5.3%	1,391	1,335	▴	0.29%
160211003	Doña Rosario	10.4%	2,750	2,331	▴	1.15%
160211013	Doña Telesfora	12.8%	3,380	2,470	▴	2.20%
160211004	La Fraternidad	12.0%	3,183	1,933	▴	3.52%
160211005	Lawigan	2.5%	666	520	▴	1.73%
160211006	Poblacion 1	6.5%	1,725	1,647	▴	0.32%
160211007	Poblacion 2	10.9%	2,879	2,501	▴	0.98%
160211008	Santa Ana	11.8%	3,111	2,501	▴	1.53%
160211009	Tagmamarkay	6.9%	1,825	1,845	▾	−0.08%
160211010	Tagpangahoy	2.0%	519	434	▴	1.25%
160211011	Tinigbasan	3.8%	1,001	796	▴	1.60%
160211012	Victory	4.3%	1,130	974	▴	1.04%
	Total		26,463	20,426	▴	1.81%

== Demographics ==
Population census of Tubay
Year	Pop.	±% p.a.
1903	747	—
1948	4,119	+3.87%
1960	7,133	+4.68%
1970	10,067	+3.50%
1975	11,673	+3.01%
1980	12,095	+0.71%
1990	15,248	+2.34%
1995	16,672	+1.69%
2000	17,668	+1.25%
2007	18,674	+0.77%
2010	20,426	+3.32%
2015	24,932	+3.87%
2020	25,785	+0.71%
2024	26,463	+0.63%
Source: Philippine Statistics Authority

In the 2024 census, Tubay had a population of 26,463. The population density was 190 inhabitants per square kilometre (490/sq mi).

== Economy ==
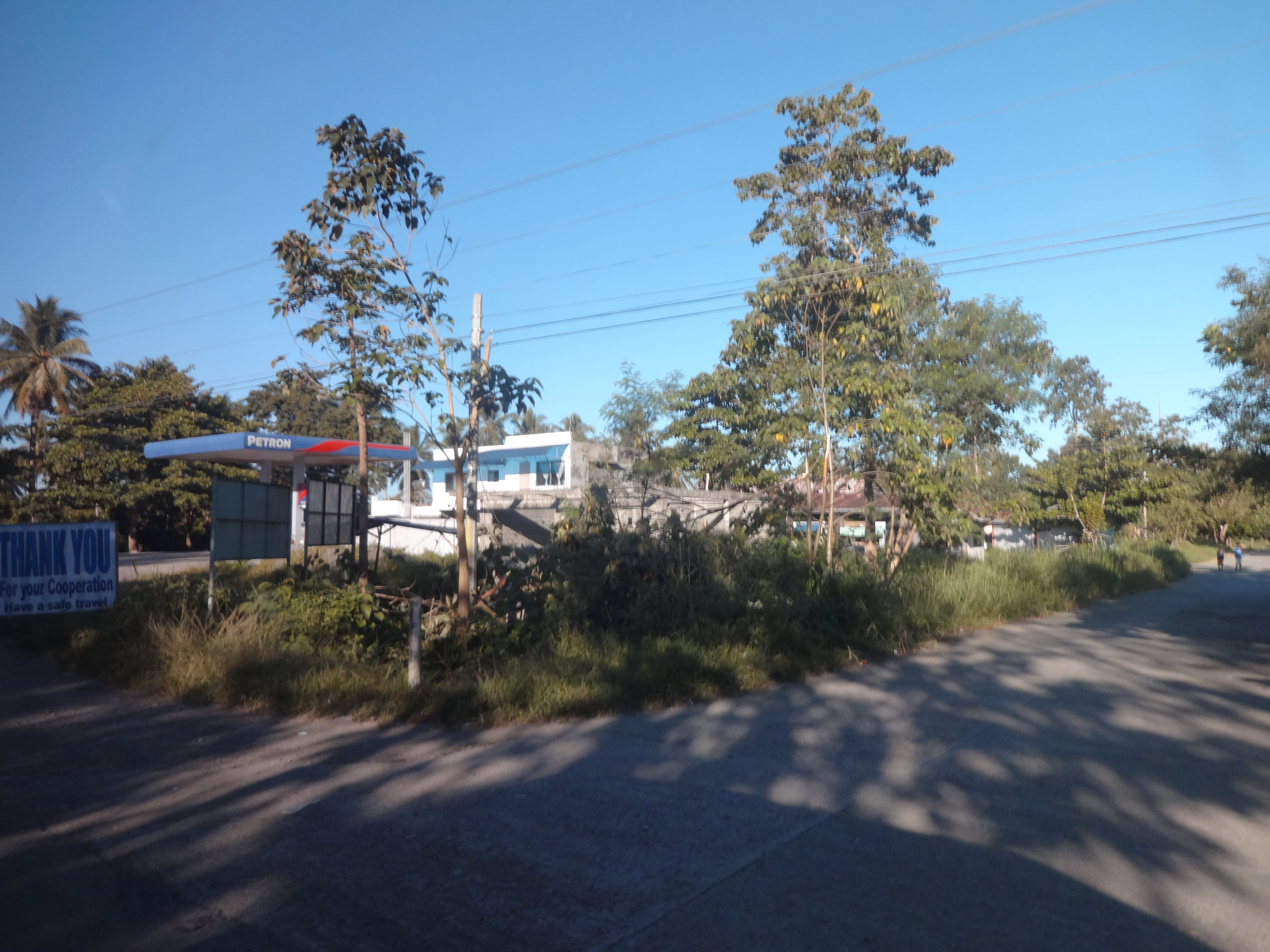
The Municipality located at the National Highway

Poverty incidence of Tubay (%)

Source: Philippine Statistics Authority
