= List of members of the House of Representatives of the Philippines (P) =

This is a complete list of past and present members of the House of Representatives of the Philippines whose last names begin with the letter P.

This list also includes members of the Philippine Assembly (1907–1916), the Commonwealth National Assembly (1935–1941), the Second Republic National Assembly (1943–1944) and the Batasang Pambansa (1978–1986).

== Pa ==
- Alfonso Pablo, member for Tarlac's 1st district (1931–1934), and Cotabato (1943–1944)
- Ernesto Pablo, member for APEC party-list (2001–2010)
- Guillermo Pablo, member for Zambales (1916–1919)
- Palileo Pablo, member for Laguna's 2nd district (1922–1925)
- Vicente Pablo, member for Ilocos Sur's 1st district (1922–1925)
- Potri Ali Pacasum, sectoral member (1978–1984)
- Arturo Pacificador, member for Region VI (1978–1984), and Antique (1984–1986)
- Bobby Pacquiao, member for OFW Family Club party-list (2019–2022)
- Manny Pacquiao, member for Sarangani (2010–2016)
- Rogelio Pacquiao, member for Sarangani (2016–2022)
- Jan Rurik Padiernos, member for GP party-list (2025–present)
- Jose Gay Padiernos, member for GP party-list (2019–2025)
- Benedicto Padilla, member for Rizal's 1st district (1957–1961)
- Carlos Padilla, member for Region II (1978–1984), and Nueva Vizcaya (1987–1992, 1995–2004, 2007–2016)
- Constancio Padilla, member for Nueva Ecija's 2nd district (1946–1949)
- Engracio Padilla, member for Iloilo's 2nd district (1928–1931)
- Gervasio Padilla, member for Cebu's 1st district (1912–1916)
- José Padilla Sr., member for Bulacan's 1st district (1919–1928)
- Nicanor Padilla, member for Pangasinan's 1st district (1907–1909)
- Roy Padilla Sr., member for Camarines Norte (1984–1986)
- Roy Padilla Jr., member for Camarines Norte (1998–2001)
- Mariano Padilla, member for Pangasinan's 2nd district (1909–1912)
- Stephen Paduano, member for Abang Lingkod party-list (2014–2025)
- Cresente Paez, member for Coop-NATCCO party-list (1998–2001, 2009–2016)
- Samuel Pagdilao Jr., member for ACT-CIS party-list (2013–2016)
- Mohamad Paglas, member for Maguindanao's 2nd district (2022), and Maguindanao del Sur (2022–2025)
- Domingo Paguirigan, member for Isabela (1946–1949)
- Pascual Paguirigan, member for Isabela (1928–1931)
- Francisco Pajao, member for Leyte's 3rd district (1946–1957)
- Fernando Pajarillo, member for Camarines Norte (1953–1957, 1965–1972)
- Leocadio Pajarillo, member for Capiz's 2nd district (1909–1912)
- Magdaleno Palacol Sr., member for Laguna's 2nd district (1965–1969), and Laguna's 4th district (1987–1998)
- Sisenando Palarca, member for Tarlac's 1st district (1925–1928)
- Raymond Palatino, member for Kabataan party-list (2009–2013)
- Teodoro L. Palma Gil, member for Mindanao and Sulu (1917–1925)
- Teodoro Palma Gil, member for Region XI (1978–1984)
- Maria Elena Palma-Gil, member for Davao del Norte's 1st district (1992–2001)
- Celso Palma, member for Region IX (1978–1984), and Tawi-Tawi (1984–1986)
- Rafael Palma, member for Cavite (1907–1908)
- Wilter Palma, member for Zamboanga Sibugay's 1st district (2022–2025)
- Wilter Palma II, member for Zamboanga Sibugay's 1st district (2016–2022)
- Rafael Palmares, member for Iloilo (1984–1986)
- Angelo Palmones, member for AGHAM party-list (2010–2013)
- Jovito Palparan, member for BANTAY party-list (2009–2010)
- Arnan Panaligan, member for Oriental Mindoro's 1st district (2022–present)
- Gavini Pancho, member for Bulacan's 2nd district (2013–2022)
- Pedro Pancho, member for Bulacan's 2nd district (1992–2001, 2004–2013)
- Tina Pancho, member for Bulacan's 2nd district (2022–present)
- Candido Pancrudo Jr., member for Bukidnon's 1st district (2007–2010)
- Nicetas Panes, member for Iloilo's 4th district (1992–1995)
- Ahdel Sambulayang Pangandaman, member for Region XII (1978–1984)
- Mohammed Hussein Pangandaman, member for Lanao del Sur's 1st district (2010–2013)
- Nasser Pangandaman, member for AA Kasosyo party-list (2011–2013)
- Solaiman Pangandaman, member for AA Kasosyo party-list (2010–2011)
- Evaristo Panganiban, member for Nueva Vizcaya (1919–1922)
- Hernani Panganiban, sectoral member (1987–1992)
- Jose Panganiban Jr., member for ANAC-IP party-list (2013–2019)
- Elmer Panotes, member for Camarines Norte's 2nd district (2010–2015)
- Marisol Panotes, member for Camarines Norte's 2nd district (2016–2022)
- Rosemarie Panotes, member for Camarines Norte's 2nd district (2022–present)
- Mauyag Papandayan Jr., member for Lanao del Sur's 2nd district (2016–2019)
- Leah Paquiz, member for Ang Nars party-list (2013–2016)
- Jesus Emmanuel Paras, member for Bukidnon's 1st district (2010–2013)
- Jacinto Paras, member for Negros Oriental's 1st district (1998–2007)
- Jerome Paras, member for Negros Oriental's 1st district (1987–1998)
- Ricardo Paras Jr., member for Tayabas's 2nd district (1919–1922)
- Jose Parayno, member for Pangasinan's 3rd district (1953–1957, 1960–1961)
- Manuel Parcon, member for Iloilo's 3rd district (1998–2001)
- Ceferino Paredes Jr., member for Agusan del Sur (1992–1998)
- Jesus Paredes, member for Abra (1945–1946)
- Lucas B. Paredes, member for Ilocos Norte's 2nd district (1909–1912)
- Lucas P. Paredes, member for Abra (1953–1965)
- Quintín Paredes, member for Abra (1925–1941, 1943–1944, 1946–1949)
- Zosimo Paredes, member for Ifugao (1984–1986)
- Andres Pascual, member for Rizal's 1st district (1922–1925)
- Emeng Pascual, member for Nueva Ecija's 4th district (2022–present)
- Gregorio Pastrana, member for Capiz's 3rd district (1921–1922)
- Domingo Patajo, member for Pangasinan's 5th district (1909–1912)
- Luisito Patalinjug, sectoral member (1978–1984), and member for Cebu (1984–1986)
- Pedro Paterno, member for Laguna's 1st district (1907–1909)
- Santiago Patero, member for Palawan (1907–1909)
- Vicente Paterno, member for Region IV (1978–1984)
- Marcos Paulino, member for Laguna's 1st district (1910–1912)
- Pablo Payawal, member for Bulacan's 2nd district (1934–1935)
- Felicito Payumo, member for Bataan's 1st district (1987–1998)
- Ponciano Payuyo, member for APEC party-list (2010–2013)

== Pe ==
- Jose Pecson, member for Pangasinan's 3rd district (1909–1912)
- Potenciano Pecson, member for Pangasinan's 1st district (1928–1935)
- Mateo Pecson, member for Masbate (1953–1957)
- Emmanuel Pelaez, member for Misamis Oriental (1949–1953, 1965–1969), and Region X (1978–1984)
- Isacio Pelaez, member for Misamis Oriental's 1st district (1987–1992)
- Francisco Peña, member for Albay's 1st district (1925–1928)
- Iñigo Peña, member for Palawan (1943–1944)
- Kid Peña, member for Makati's 1st district (2019–present)
- Teodoro Peña, member for Region IV-A (1978–1984)
- Mariano Peñaflorida, member for Iloilo's 4th district (1947–1948, 1969–1972)
- Florentino Peñaranda, member for Leyte's 3rd district (1907–1909)
- Salipada Pendatun, member for Cotabato (1957–1972), and Maguindanao (1984–1986)
- Vicente Peralta, member for Sorsogon's 2nd district (1953–1969)
- Amadeo Perez Sr., member for Pangasinan's 4th district (1949–1969)
- Amadeo Perez Jr., member for Pangasinan's 5th district (1992–2001)
- Benjamin Perez, member for Nueva Vizcaya (1969–1972), and Region II (1978–1984)
- Eugenio Pérez, member for Pangasinan's 2nd district (1928–1941, 1945–1957)
- Filemon Perez, member for Tayabas's 1st district (1909–1916)
- Francisco Perez II, member for Batangas's 2nd district (2001–2004)
- Hernando Perez, member for Batangas (1984–1986), and Batangas's 2nd district (1987–1998)
- Jerry Perez, member for Zamboanga City's 2nd district (2025–present)
- Juan Perez, member for Leyte's 4th district (1946–1949)
- Leonardo B. Perez, member for Nueva Vizcaya (1953–1969, 1984–1986, 1992–1995)
- Rodrigo Perez, member for Pangasinan's 2nd district (1912–1916)
- Toribio Perez, member for Albay's 2nd district (1946–1949)
- Francisco Perfecto, member for Albay's 2nd district (1925–1928), Albay's 4th district (1945–1946), and Catanduanes (1946–1949, 1953–1957)
- Gregorio Perfecto, member for Manila's 1st district (1922–1928, 1935–1941)
- Waldo Perfecto, member for Region IV (1978–1984)
- Anna Periquet, sectoral member (1995–1998)
- Dominador Pernes, member for Region VII (1978–1984)
- Marie Anne Pernes, member for Siquijor (2013–2016)
- Remedios Petilla, member for Leyte's 1st district (2004–2007)
- Rogelio Peyuan, sectoral member (1978–1984)

== Pi ==
- Mariano Piamonte Jr., member for A Teacher party-list (2007–2016)
- Abdullah Piang, member for Mindanao and Sulu (1925–1928)
- Datu Piang, member for Mindanao and Sulu (1917–1922)
- Gumbay Piang, member for Cotabato (1946–1949)
- Menandang Piang, member for Cotabato (1943–1944)
- Ugalingan Piang, member for Mindanao and Sulu (1922–1925), and Cotabato (1938–1941, 1945–1946)
- Eugenio Picazo, member for Capiz's 1st district (1907–1909)
- Philip Pichay, member for Surigao del Sur's 1st district (2007–2016)
- Prospero Pichay Jr., member for Surigao del Sur's 1st district (1998–2007, 2016–2022)
- Pepito Pico, member for Diwa party-list (2018–2019)
- Roy Pilando, member for Mountain Province (2001–2004)
- Eduardo Pilapil, member for Camarines Sur's 3rd district (1987–1992), and VFP party-list (1998–2001)
- Alexander Pimentel, member for Surigao del Sur's 2nd district (2025–present)
- Aquilino Pimentel Jr., member for Cagayan de Oro (1984–1986)
- Emmanuel Pimentel, member for Camarines Norte (1992–1998)
- Froilan Pimentel, member for Camarines Norte (1935–1941)
- Johnny Pimentel, member for Surigao del Sur's 2nd district (2016–2025)
- Marcial Pimentel, member for Camarines Norte (1961–1965), and Region V (1978–1984)
- Vicente Pimentel, member for Surigao del Sur (1961–1965)
- Aurelio Pineda, member for Tarlac's 2nd district (1907–1909)
- Enrico Pineda, member for 1-Pacman party-list (2016–2022)
- Marciano Pineda, member for Pampanga's 4th district (1987–1991)
- Jose Ping-ay, member for Coop-NATCCO party-list (2007–2013)
- Arthur Pingoy Jr., member for South Cotabato's 2nd district (2001–2010)
- Bernardo Piñol Jr., member for Cotabato's 2nd district (2007–2010)
- Miguel Pio, member for Cagayan's 2nd district (1938–1941, 1945–1946)

== Pl ==
- Jovito Plameras Jr., member for Antique (1998–2001)
- Serviliano Platon, member for Laguna's 1st district (1912–1916)
- Charito Plaza, member for Agusan del Norte's 1st district (1987–1998)
- Democrito Plaza, member for Agusan del Sur (1969–1972, 1984–1986, 1987–1992)
- Eddiebong Plaza, member for Agusan del Sur's 2nd district (2019–present)
- Maria Valentina Plaza, member for Agusan del Sur's 1st district (2010–2019)
- Rodolfo Plaza, member for Agusan del Sur (2001–2010)
- Salvador Pleyto, member for Bulacan's 6th district (2022–present)

== Po ==
- Ricardo Poblete, member for Cavite (1943–1944)
- Baldomero Pobre, member for Ilocos Norte's 2nd district (1907–1909)
- David Ponce de Leon, member for Palawan's 1st district (1987–1995)
- Alfonso Ponce Enrile, member for Cagayan's 1st district (1922–1925)
- Mariano Ponce, member for Bulacan's 2nd district (1909–1912)
- Nestor Ponce Jr., member for Manila's 2nd district (1998–2001)
- Alfonso Ponce Enrile, member for Cagayan's 1st district (1922–1925)
- Sally Ponce Enrile, member for Cagayan's 1st district (2007–2010, 2013–2016)
- Conrado Potenciano, member for Laguna's 1st district (1945–1946)

== Pr ==
- Monica Prieto-Teodoro, member for Tarlac's 1st district (2007–2010)
- Cipriano Primicias Sr., member for Pangasinan's 4th district (1934–1935, 1945–1949)
- Cipriano Primicias Jr., member for Pangasinan's 3rd district (1957–1960, 1961–1969)
- Corazon Primicias, member for Pangasinan's 3rd district (1969–1972)
- Marlyn Primicias-Agabas, member for Pangasinan's 6th district (2010–2019, 2022–present)

== Pu ==
- Monico Puentevella, member for Bacolod (2001–2010)
- Jose Puey, member for Negros Occidental's 1st district (1953–1957)
- Manuel Puey, member for Negros Occidental's 2nd district (1987–1995)
- Franz Pumaren, member for Quezon City's 3rd district (2022–present)
- Ricardo C. Puno, member for Region IV (1978–1984)
- Roberto Puno, member for Antipolo's 1st district (2007–2016, 2019–2025)
- Ronaldo Puno, member for Antipolo's 1st district (2004–2006, 2025–present)
- Cicero Punsalan, member for Region III (1978–1984)
- Jesus Punzalan, member for Oriental Mindoro's 2nd district (1987–1998)
- Lynnette Punzalan, member for Quezon's 2nd district (2001–2004)
- Marcial Punzalan Jr., member for Quezon's 2nd district (1992–2001)
- Eustaquio Purugganan, member for Ilocos Sur's 3rd district (1916–1919), and Abra (1919–1922)
- Severino Purugganan, member for Nueva Vizcaya (1934–1935)
- Gonzalo Puyat II, member for Manila (1984–1986)
- Jose Puyat Jr., member for Surigao del Sur (1969–1972), and Region XI (1978–1984)
- Maria Consuelo Puyat-Reyes, member for Makati (1987–1992)
- David Puzon Sr., member for Cagayan's 2nd district (1969–1972), and Kalinga-Apayao (1984–1986)
- Leoncio Puzon, member for Cagayan's 2nd district (1987–1992)
- Rolando Puzon, member for Region II (1978–1986)
