= Commission on Appointments =

Constitutional body of the Congress of the Philippines

Commission on Appointments Komisyon sa Paghirang
- 20th Congress of the Philippines
- Seal of the Commission on Appointments

History
- Founded: November 25, 1935; July 27, 1987 (reestablishment)
- New session started: August 26, 2025

Leadership
- Chairman: Sherwin Gatchalian, NPC since June 17, 2026
- Vice Chairman: Ramon Guico Jr., Lakas since August 26, 2025

Structure
- Seats: 25: 24 regular members; 1 ex officio presiding officer
- Political groups: Senate contingent (13) (Note: Includes Sherwin Gatchalian as the ex officio chairperson of the commission): NPC (3); Nacionalista (2); Akbayan (1); PDP (1); PMP (1); Independent (5); House of Representatives contingent (12): Lakas (4); NPC (2); NUP (2); PFP (2); Party-list (2)

Meeting place
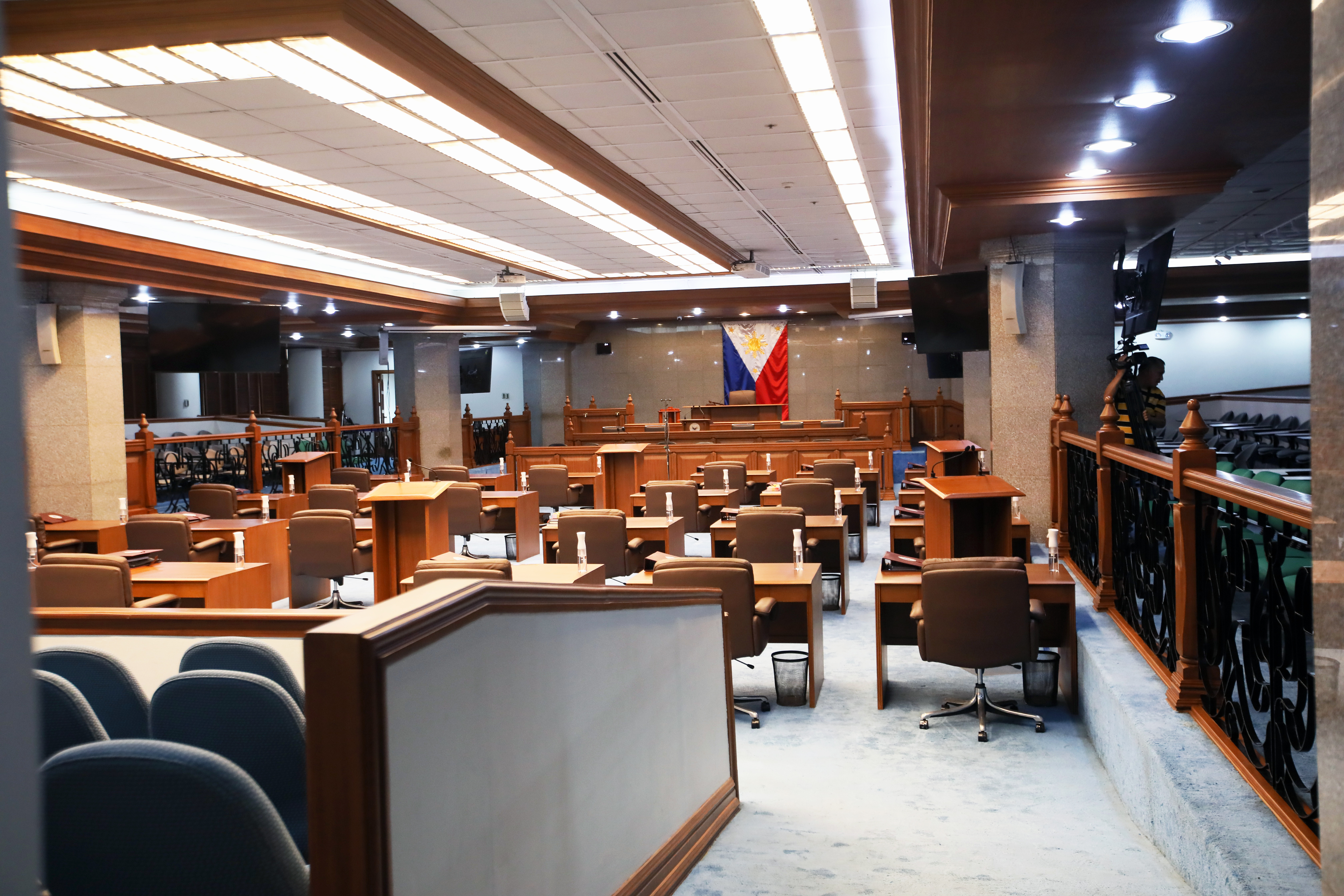
- GSIS Building, Financial Center, Jose W. Diokno Boulevard, Pasay

Website
- www.comappt.gov.ph

The Commission on Appointments (Filipino: Komisyon sa Paghirang, abbreviated as CA) is a constitutional body which confirms or rejects certain political appointments made by the President of the Philippines. The current commission was created by the 1987 Constitution.

While often associated with the Congress of the Philippines, which consists of the House of Representatives and the Senate, and mistakenly referred to as a congressional committee, the Commission on Appointments is an independent body from the legislature, though its membership is confined to members of Congress.

== Background ==
The Commission on Appointments confirms certain appointments made by the President of the Philippines. Article VII, Section 16 of the 1987 Constitution reads:

"The President shall nominate and, with the consent of the Commission on Appointments, appoint the heads of the executive departments, ambassadors, other public ministers and consuls, or officers of the armed forces from the rank of colonel or naval captain, and other officers whose appointments are vested in him in this Constitution. He shall also appoint all other officers of the Government whose appointments are not otherwise provided for by law, and those whom he may be authorized by law to appoint. The Congress may, by law, vest the appointment of other officers lower in rank in the President alone, in the courts, or in the heads of departments, agencies, commissions, or boards.

The Vice President is exempted from a confirmation hearing to any cabinet position. The nomination of a person to the vice presidency due to a vacancy is handled by both houses of Congress, voting separately.

During the operation of the Jones Law, the Senate confirmed the Governor-General's appointments. During the operation of the 1935 Constitution, the commission was composed of 21 members of the National Assembly of the Philippines. With the restoration of the bicameral Congress in 1940, the commission was composed of 12 senators and 12 representatives with the Senate President as the ex officio chairman. During the operation of the 1973 Constitution, the president appointed at will and without "checks and balances" from the then-parliament. The current constitution, which was ratified in 1987, brought back the 25-member commission.

== Officials confirmed ==
1. Heads of Executive Departments
2. Ambassadors, other Public Ministers and Consuls
3. High Ranking Officers of the Armed Forces from the rank of Colonel or Naval Captain
4. Regular Members of the Judicial and Bar Council
5. Chairman and Commissioners of the Constitutional Commissions (Commission on Elections, Commission on Audit, Civil Service Commission)

The appointments of all judges and the Ombudsman need not be confirmed by the Commission on Appointments. Instead, they are recommended by the Judicial and Bar Council in a short list, from which the President shall then choose from.

Prior to the institutionalization of the party-list system, the president appointed the sectoral representatives. Congress then decided to have these confirmed via the commission, as well.

=== Under the 1935 Constitution ===
1. Heads of the executive departments and bureaus
2. Officers of the Army from the rank of colonel, of the Navy and air forces from the rank of captain or commander
3. All other officers of the Government whose appointments are not herein otherwise provided for, and those whom he may be authorized by law to appoint
4. Ambassadors, other public ministers, and consuls
5. Members of the Supreme Court and all judges of inferior courts
6. The Resident Commissioner of the Philippines (until 1946)

== Composition ==
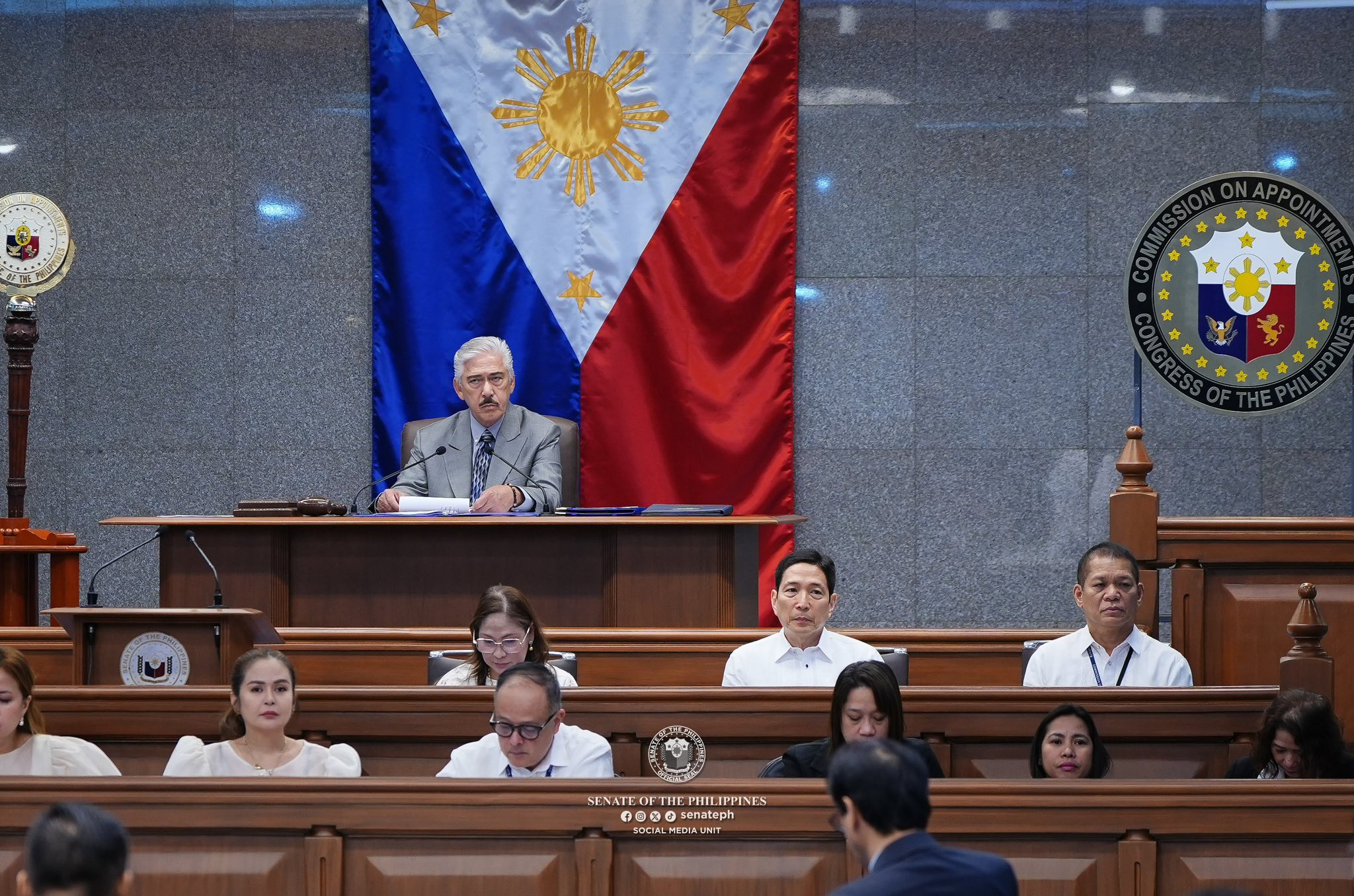
Senate President Tito Sotto presides over a plenary session of the Commission on Appointments on February 4, 2026.

The commission is composed of the Senate President, the ex officio chairman, twelve senators, and twelve members of the House of Representatives. Members from each house of Congress are elected based on proportional representation from the political parties and parties or organizations registered under the party-list system represented. The Chairman of the Commission shall vote only in case of a tie. It shall act on all appointments submitted within thirty session days of Congress. It shall be governed by a majority vote of all members.

== Procedure ==
A president can either make a nomination or an appointment. Either action involves the commission.

Most presidential actions are ad interim appointments, done when Congress is not in session. In these cases, the appointment allows the official to discharge the duties related to the office immediately. The ad interim appointment ceases to be valid if the commission explicitly rejects the appointment, or if the commission "bypasses" the appointment. If the commission rejects the appointment, the official is no longer allowed to discharge the duties related to his or her office, and the president has to appoint someone else. If the commission bypasses the official, the president can re-appoint that person.

The president can also nominate an official if Congress is in session. In a "regular" nomination, the official can only discharge the duties once the commission consents to the appointment.

Just as other legislative bodies, the commission is divided into different committees. Each appointment is coursed through the committee concerned. After hearings are held, the committee decides to confirm or reject the appointment; the commission en banc then deliberates on whether to accept the committee's decision.

== Meeting place ==
The commission meets at the GSIS Building in Pasay, the seat of the Senate.

== Current membership ==
As of October 8, 2026
| Position | Name | Chamber | Constituency | Party | Since |
|---|---|---|---|---|---|
| Chairperson (Note: The Senate president only votes to break ties.) | Sherwin Gatchalian | Senate | At-large | NPC | June 17, 2026 |
| Vice Chairperson | Ramon Guico Jr. | House of Representatives | Pangasinan–5th | Lakas | August 26, 2025 |
| Assistant Majority Floor Leader | Joel Villanueva | Senate | At-large | Independent | June 17, 2026 |
| Assistant Minority Floor Leader | Tonypet Albano | House of Representatives | Isabela–1st | PFP | August 26, 2025 |
| Assistant Minority Floor Leader | Allan Ty | House of Representatives | Party-list | LPGMA | August 26, 2025 |
| Member | Benjamin Agarao Jr. | House of Representatives | Laguna–4th | PFP | August 26, 2025 |
| Member | Mercedes Alvarez | House of Representatives | Negros Occidental–6th | NPC | June 17, 2026 |
| Member | Jose Aquino II | House of Representatives | Butuan at-large | Lakas | August 26, 2025 |
| Member | Alan Peter Cayetano | Senate | At-large | Independent | October 8, 2026 |
| Member | JV Ejercito | Senate | At-large | NPC | August 26, 2025 |
| Member | Roy Loyola | House of Representatives | Cavite–5th | NPC | August 13, 2026 |
| Member | Jinggoy Estrada | Senate | At-large | PMP | August 26, 2025 |
| Member | Bong Go | Senate | At-large | PDP | August 26, 2025 |
| Member | Risa Hontiveros | Senate | At-large | Akbayan | August 26, 2025 |
| Member | Panfilo Lacson | Senate | At-large | Independent | September 24, 2025 |
| Member | Rodante Marcoleta | Senate | At-large | Independent | August 26, 2025 |
| Member | Imee Marcos | Senate | At-large | Nacionalista | August 26, 2025 |
| Member | Lani Mercado | House of Representatives | Cavite–2nd | Lakas | August 26, 2025 |
| Member | Paolo Ortega | House of Representatives | La Union–1st | Lakas | June 17, 2026 |
| Member | Franz Pumaren | House of Representatives | Quezon City–3rd | NUP | June 17, 2026 |
| Member | Tito Sotto | Senate | At-large | NPC | June 17, 2026 |
| Member | Marcelino Teodoro | House of Representatives | Marikina–1st | NUP | February 25, 2026 |
| Member | Jose Teves Jr. | House of Representatives | Party-list | TGP | June 17, 2026 |
| Member | Raffy Tulfo | Senate | At-large | Independent | August 26, 2025 |
| Member | Mark Villar | Senate | At-large | Nacionalista | October 8, 2026 |

- Secretary: Myra Marie Villarica
- Sergeant-at-Arms: PMGen. Alfredo Sotto-Corpus

Membership per party
| Party | Senate | House | Total |
|---|---|---|---|
| NPC | 2+1 | 2 | 4+1 |
| Lakas | 0 | 4 | 4 |
| Nacionalista | 2 | 0 | 2 |
| NUP | 0 | 2 | 2 |
| PFP | 0 | 2 | 2 |
| Akbayan | 1 | 0 | 1 |
| LPGMA | 0 | 1 | 1 |
| PDP | 1 | 0 | 1 |
| PMP | 1 | 0 | 1 |
| TGP | 0 | 1 | 1 |
| Independent | 5 | 0 | 5 |
| Total | 12+1 | 12 | 24+1 |

== Historical membership (since 1987) ==
List of chairpersons
| Name | Party | Tenure |
|---|---|---|
| Jovito Salonga | Liberal | 1987–1992 |
| Neptali Gonzales | LDP | 1992–1993 |
| Edgardo Angara | LDP | 1993–1995 |
| Neptali Gonzales | LDP | 1995–1996 |
| Ernesto Maceda | NPC | 1996–1998 |
| Neptali Gonzales | LDP | 1998 |
| Marcelo Fernan | LDP | 1998–1999 |
| Blas Ople | LAMP | 1999–2000 |
| Franklin Drilon | LAMP | 2000 |
| Franklin Drilon | Independent | 2000 |
| Nene Pimentel | PDP–Laban | 2000–2001 |
| Franklin Drilon | Independent | 2001–2006 |
| Franklin Drilon | Liberal | 2001–2006 |
| Manny Villar | Nacionalista | 2006–2008 |
| Juan Ponce Enrile | PMP | 2008–2013 |
| Franklin Drilon | Liberal | 2013–2016 |
| Koko Pimentel | PDP–Laban | 2016–2018 |
| Tito Sotto | NPC | 2018–2022 |
| Juan Miguel Zubiri | Independent | 2022–2024 |
| Francis Escudero | NPC | 2024–2025 |
| Tito Sotto | NPC | 2025–2026 |
| Alan Peter Cayetano | Independent | 2026 |
| Sherwin Gatchalian | NPC | 2026 |

List of vice chairpersons
| Name | Constituency | Party | Tenure |
|---|---|---|---|
| Miguel Romero | Negros Oriental–2nd | Lakas ng Bansa | c. 1987 – c. 1992 |
| Raul del Mar | Cebu City–1st | Lakas | c. 1995 – c. 1998 |
| Rodolfo Plaza | Agusan del Sur at-large | NPC | c. 2007 – c. 2010 |
| Roilo Golez | Parañaque–2nd | Liberal | 2010–2013 |
| Mel Senen Sarmiento | Samar–1st | Liberal | 2013–2015 |
| Antonio del Rosario | Capiz–1st | Liberal | 2015–2016 |
| Ronaldo Zamora | San Juan at-large | PDP–Laban | 2016–2022 |
| Ramon Guico Jr. | Pangasinan–5th | Lakas | 2022–2025 |

20th Congress members
| Name | Chamber | Constituency | Party | Tenure |
|---|---|---|---|---|
| Romeo Acop | House of Representatives | Antipolo–2nd | NUP | August 26 – December 20, 2025 (Note: Died in office.) |
| Robert Raymund Estrella | House of Representatives | Party-list | Abono | December 10, 2025 – June 17, 2026 |
| Arnulf Bryan Fuentebella | House of Representatives | Camarines Sur–4th | NPC | August 26, 2025 – June 17, 2026 |
| Roy Loyola | House of Representatives | Cavite–5th | NPC | August 26, 2025 – June 17, 2026 |
| Eddiebong Plaza | House of Representatives | Agusan del Sur–2nd | NUP | August 26, 2025 – June 17, 2026 |
| Jurdin Jesus Romualdo | House of Representatives | Camiguin at-large | Lakas | August 26, 2025 – June 17, 2026 |
| Lito Lapid | Senate | At-large | NPC | September 24, 2025 – June 17, 2026 |
| Loren Legarda | Senate | At-large | NPC | September 24, 2025 – October 8, 2026 |
| Juan Miguel Zubiri | Senate | At-large | Independent | June 17, 2026 – October 8, 2026 |

== Rejection of appointment ==
Rejection by the commission of the president's appointment is very rare. Usually, due to the padrino system of patronage politics, the president's party controls a supermajority of votes in the House of Representatives, thus mirroring its composition of the commission. This means appointments are almost always are approved, although some are not without difficulty.

List of rejection of nominees by the Commission on Appointments
| Person chosen | Position | Year | Chosen by | Ref. |
|---|---|---|---|---|
| Mary Concepcion Bautista | Chairman of the Commission on Human Rights | 1989 | Corazon Aquino | |
| Ramon del Rosario | Secretary of Finance | 1993 | Fidel V. Ramos | |
| Ricardo Saludo | Chairman of the Civil Service Commission | 2009 | Gloria Macapagal Arroyo | |
| Perfecto Yasay | Secretary of Foreign Affairs | 2017 | Rodrigo Duterte | |
| Gina Lopez | Secretary of Environment and Natural Resources | 2017 | Rodrigo Duterte | |
| Rafael V. Mariano | Secretary of Agrarian Reform | 2017 | Rodrigo Duterte | |
| Judy Taguiwalo | Secretary of Social Welfare and Development | 2017 | Rodrigo Duterte | |
| Paulyn Ubial | Secretary of Health | 2017 | Rodrigo Duterte | |
| Michael Peloton | Commissioner of the Commission on Elections | 2021 | Rodrigo Duterte | |
| Erwin Tulfo | Secretary of Social Welfare and Development | 2022 | Bongbong Marcos | |

In Bautista vs. Salonga, the Supreme Court ruled that the positions within the Commission on Human Rights are not one of the positions confirmed by the Commission on Appointments, invalidating Mary Concepcion Bautista's rejection.

Another way the commission can reject an appointment is by bypassing it; here, the nomination is not acted upon until Congress adjourns its session. The president can still renominate the person for the next session of Congress. If the commission bypasses a nomination and then Congress adjourns sine die, the nomination is lost. There had been proposals to limit bypasses up to three.

== Committees ==
The Commission has several committees:

Until June 17, 2026
| Committee | Positions considered | Chairperson | Party | Vice chairperson | Party | Regular members | Total |
|---|---|---|---|---|---|---|---|
| Foreign Affairs | Secretary of Foreign Affairs; Ambassadors; Other public ministers and consuls | Panfilo Lacson | Independent | Lito Lapid | NPC | 9 | 17 |
| Foreign Affairs | Secretary of Foreign Affairs; Ambassadors; Other public ministers and consuls | Panfilo Lacson | Independent | Loren Legarda | NPC | 9 | 17 |
| Foreign Affairs | Secretary of Foreign Affairs; Ambassadors; Other public ministers and consuls | Panfilo Lacson | Independent | Imee Marcos | Nacionalista | 9 | 17 |
| Foreign Affairs | Secretary of Foreign Affairs; Ambassadors; Other public ministers and consuls | Panfilo Lacson | Independent | Tonypet Albano | PFP | 9 | 17 |
| Foreign Affairs | Secretary of Foreign Affairs; Ambassadors; Other public ministers and consuls | Panfilo Lacson | Independent | Jose Aquino II | Lakas | 9 | 17 |
| Foreign Affairs | Secretary of Foreign Affairs; Ambassadors; Other public ministers and consuls | Panfilo Lacson | Independent | Lani Mercado | Lakas | 9 | 17 |
| Foreign Affairs | Secretary of Foreign Affairs; Ambassadors; Other public ministers and consuls | Panfilo Lacson | Independent | Allan Ty | LPGMA | 9 | 17 |
| National Defense | Secretary of National Defense; Officers of the Armed Forces from the rank of colonel or naval captain and above | Jose Aquino II | Lakas | Bong Go | PDP | 9 | 17 |
| National Defense | Secretary of National Defense; Officers of the Armed Forces from the rank of colonel or naval captain and above | Jose Aquino II | Lakas | Panfilo Lacson | Independent | 9 | 17 |
| National Defense | Secretary of National Defense; Officers of the Armed Forces from the rank of colonel or naval captain and above | Jose Aquino II | Lakas | Raffy Tulfo | Independent | 9 | 17 |
| National Defense | Secretary of National Defense; Officers of the Armed Forces from the rank of colonel or naval captain and above | Jose Aquino II | Lakas | Mark Villar | Nacionalista | 9 | 17 |
| National Defense | Secretary of National Defense; Officers of the Armed Forces from the rank of colonel or naval captain and above | Jose Aquino II | Lakas | Benjamin Agarao Jr. | PFP | 9 | 17 |
| National Defense | Secretary of National Defense; Officers of the Armed Forces from the rank of colonel or naval captain and above | Jose Aquino II | Lakas | Arnulf Bryan Fuentebella | NPC | 9 | 17 |
| National Defense | Secretary of National Defense; Officers of the Armed Forces from the rank of colonel or naval captain and above | Jose Aquino II | Lakas | Eddiebong Plaza | NUP | 9 | 17 |
| Finance | Secretary of Finance | Lito Lapid | NPC | Allan Ty | LPGMA | 15 | 17 |
| Budget and Management | Secretary of Budget and Management | Mark Villar | Nacionalista | Tonypet Albano | PFP | 15 | 17 |
| Justice and Judicial and Bar Council | Secretary of Justice; Regular members of the Judicial and Bar Council | Rodante Marcoleta | Independent | Jose Aquino II | Lakas | 15 | 17 |
| Agriculture | Secretary of Agriculture | Marcelino Teodoro | NUP | Lito Lapid | NPC | 15 | 17 |
| Public Works and Highways | Secretary of Public Works and Highways | Roy Loyola | NPC | Raffy Tulfo | Independent | 14 | 17 |
| Public Works and Highways | Secretary of Public Works and Highways | Roy Loyola | NPC | Marcelino Teodoro | NUP | 14 | 17 |
| Education | Secretary of Education | Raffy Tulfo | Independent | Roy Loyola | NPC | 15 | 17 |
| Labor, Employment, Social Welfare and Migrant Workers | Secretary of Labor and Employment; Secretary of Social Welfare and Development; Secretary of Migrant Workers | Benjamin Agarao Jr. | PFP | Imee Marcos | Nacionalista | 15 | 17 |
| Health | Secretary of Health | Bong Go | PDP | Roy Loyola | NPC | 15 | 17 |
| Trade and Industry | Secretary of Trade and Industry | Lani Mercado | Lakas | Loren Legarda | NPC | 15 | 17 |
| Tourism and Economic Development | Secretary of Tourism; Secretary of Economy, Planning, and Development | Arnulf Bryan Fuentebella | NPC | Loren Legarda | NPC | 15 | 17 |
| Environment and Natural Resources | Secretary of Environment and Natural Resources | JV Ejercito | NPC | Eddiebong Plaza | NUP | 15 | 17 |
| Science and Technology | Secretary of Science and Technology | Eddiebong Plaza | NUP | Risa Hontiveros | Akbayan | 15 | 17 |
| Interior and Local Government | Secretary of the Interior and Local Government | Loren Legarda | NPC | Allan Ty | LPGMA | 15 | 17 |
| Constitutional Commissions and Offices | Members of the Civil Service Commission; Members of the Commission on Audit; Members of the Commission on Elections | Joel Villanueva | Independent | Robert Raymund Estrella | Abono | 15 | 17 |
| Transportation | Secretary of Transportation | Lani Mercado | Lakas | Raffy Tulfo | Independent | 15 | 17 |
| Agrarian Reforms | Secretary of Agrarian Reform | Risa Hontiveros | Akbayan | Robert Raymund Estrella | Abono | 15 | 17 |
| Executive Secretary and Presidential Communications; Offices of the Office of the President and the Philippine; Space Agency | Executive Secretary; Secretary of the Presidential Communications Office; Director-General of the Philippine Space Agency | Robert Raymund Estrella | Abono | Raffy Tulfo | Independent | 15 | 17 |
| Energy | Secretary of Energy | Jinggoy Estrada | PMP | Marcelino Teodoro | NUP | 15 | 17 |
| Information and Communications Technology | Secretary of Information and Communications Technology | Allan Ty | LPGMA | Loren Legarda | NPC | 15 | 17 |
| Human Settlements and Urban Development | Secretary of Human Settlements and Urban Development | Imee Marcos | Nacionalista | Roy Loyola | NPC | 15 | 17 |
| Accounts | | Tonypet Albano | PFP | Mark Villar | Nacionalista | 7 | 9 |
| Rules and Resolutions | | Jurdin Jesus Romualdo | Lakas | JV Ejercito | NPC | 5 | 9 |
| Rules and Resolutions | | Jurdin Jesus Romualdo | Lakas | Joel Villanueva | Independent | 5 | 9 |
| Rules and Resolutions | | Jurdin Jesus Romualdo | Lakas | Robert Raymund Estrella | Abono | 5 | 9 |
| Ethics | | Jose Aquino II | Lakas | Mark Villar | Nacionalista | 7 | 9 |

== See also ==
- Appointments Clause, clause in the United States Constitution where the commission is based from.
