= Democrito Plaza =

Filipino politician (1921–1995)

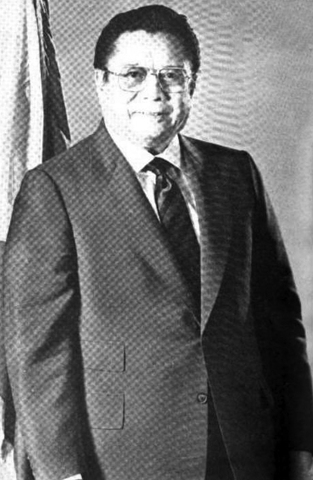
- Plaza's official portrait during the 8th Congress

Member of the Philippine House of Representatives for Agusan del Sur's at-large district
- In office June 30, 1987 – June 30, 1992
- Preceded by: District reestablished (seat previously held by himself in 1984)
- Succeeded by: Ceferino Paredes Jr.
- In office December 30, 1969 – January 17, 1973
- Preceded by: District established
- Succeeded by: District abolished (seat later held by himself in 1984)

Member of the Batasang Pambansa from Agusan del Sur
- In office June 30, 1984 – March 25, 1986

Governor of Agusan del Sur
- In office June 30, 1992 – September 2, 1995
- Vice Governor: Alex Bascug
- Preceded by: Ceferino Paredes Jr.
- Succeeded by: Alex Bascug

Governor of Agusan
- In office 1960–1963
- Preceded by: Felixberto Dagani Sr.
- Succeeded by: Jose C. Aquino

Personal details
- Born: December 28, 1921 Talacogon, Agusan del Sur, Philippine Islands
- Died: September 2, 1995 (aged 73)
- Party: LDP (1988–1995)
- Other political affiliations: Nacionalista (1959–1973, 1987–1988); UNIDO (1987–1988); KBL (1984–1986)
- Spouse: Valentina Galido
- Nickname: DO

Democrito Otaza Plaza (December 28, 1921 – September 2, 1995) was a Filipino businessman and politician who served as the representative for Agusan del Sur's at-large congressional district in the Philippine House of Representatives from 1969 to 1973 and from 1987 to 1992. He also served as governor of the undivided Agusan province from 1960 to 1963, member of the Batasang Pambansa representing Agusan del Sur 1984 to 1986, and as governor of Agusan del Sur from 1992 until his death in office in 1995.

He was the patriarch of the Plaza family, a prominent political clan in Agusan del Sur.

== Early life and education ==
Democrito Otaza Plaza was born on December 28, 1921, in Talacogon, Agusan del Sur, to Alejandro Plaza and Flavia Otaza. He did not obtain a college degree and went into the logging business.

== Early career ==
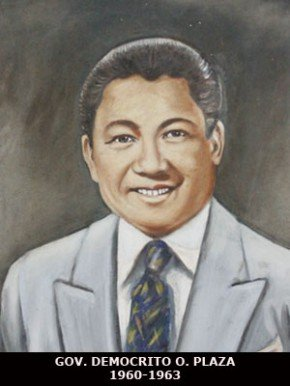
Portrait of Plaza as governor of Agusan

Plaza's earliest known political position was as a city councilor of Butuan. In 1959, he was elected governor of the formerly undivided province of Agusan, serving until 1963.

== House of Representatives (1969–1973) ==
In 1967, the province was divided into Agusan del Norte and Agusan del Sur, creating two new districts in the House of Representatives. Plaza successfully ran for Agusan del Sur's lone congressional district in 1969 under the Nacionalista Party. His term was cut short by the ratification of the 1973 Constitution, which abolished Congress following President Ferdinand Marcos's declaration of martial law in September 1972.

== Batasang Pambansa (1984–1986) ==
In 1984, Plaza ran under the ruling Kilusang Bagong Lipunan for the national parliament, known as the Batasang Pambansa, representing Agusan del Sur. As an assemblyman, he was a member of the parliamentary committees on Energy, Natural Resources, and Socio-Economic Planning and Development. He served until 1986, after the People Power Revolution installed Corazon Aquino as president and a new provisional Constitution took effect.

== House of Representatives (1987–1992) ==
Plaza won the 1987 election to the reestablished House of Representatives, reclaiming his former congressional seat. During the 8th Congress, Plaza was a member of the House committees on Health, National Cultural Communities, National Defense, Natural Resources, Public Order and Security, Public Works and Highways, and Ways and Means.

Plaza criticized the number of lawyers in the House, stating that too many lawyers resulted in too many "lawyers' bills" and that they lacked direction in managing the economy.

== Governor of Agusan del Sur (1992–1995) ==
Plaza served one more congressional term before running for governor of Agusan del Sur in 1992, with Alex Bascug as his running mate under Laban ng Demokratikong Pilipino. They were re-elected in June 1995, but Plaza was unable to finish his term because he died in September of the same year.

== Personal life ==
Plaza was married to Valentina Galido, with whom he had several children, including Rodolfo, who later held his congressional seat; Maria Valentina, who represented Agusan del Sur's 1st district; and Evelyn and Eddiebong, who represented Agusan del Sur's 2nd district. He had a son from his first marriage, Democrito II, who served as mayor of Butuan. He was professionally affiliated with the Governors League of the Philippines and the City Mayors League of the Philippines, serving as national treasurer of the respective organizations. He also served as a director of the Philippine Chamber of Wood Industries, was a member of the Philippine Wood Producers Association, and was recognized as Supreme Datu Lipus Makapandung of the Manobo-Higaonon tribes.

Plaza died on September 2, 1995.

== Legacy ==
Track oval of the Democrito O. Plaza Memorial Sports Complex

The Governor Democrito O. Plaza Government Center, the Democrito O. Plaza Memorial Sports Complex, and the Democrito O. Plaza Memorial Hospital, all in Agusan del Sur, were named in his honor.

House of Representatives of the Philippines
New district	Member of the Philippine House of Representatives for Agusan del Sur's at-large district 1987–1992	Succeeded by Ceferino Paredes Jr.
New district	Member of the Philippine House of Representatives for Agusan del Sur's at-large district 1969–1973	Vacant Martial law and adoption of the 1973 Constitution Title next held by Himself (in the Batasang Pambansa)
New district	Member of the Batasang Pambansa from Agusan del Sur; 1984–1986	District abolished
Political offices
Preceded by Ceferino Paredes Jr.	Governor of Agusan del Sur; 1992–1995	Succeeded by Alex Bascug
Preceded by Felixberto Dagani Sr.	Governor of Agusan; 1960–1963	Succeeded by Jose C. Aquino
