= Agusan del Sur's at-large congressional district =

Legislative district of the Philippines

- Former constituency for the House of Representatives of the Philippines and Batasang Pambansa
- Location of Agusan del Sur within the
- Province: Agusan del Sur

Former constituency
- Created: 1967 (first creation); 1984 (second creation)
- Abolished: 1973 (first abolition); 2008 (second abolition)

Agusan del Sur's at-large congressional district was a congressional district that encompassed the entire province of Agusan del Sur in the Philippines. It was represented in the House of Representatives from 1969 to 1972, in the Regular Batasang Pambansa from 1984 to 1986, and in the restored House of Representatives from 1987 to 2010. The province of Agusan del Sur was created as a result of the partition of Agusan in 1967 and elected its first representative provincewide at-large during the 1969 Philippine House of Representatives elections. It was a short-lived district for the Third Philippine Republic Congress, having been eliminated following the dissolution of the lower house in 1972. The province was later absorbed by the multi-member Region X's at-large district for the national parliament in 1978. In 1984, provincial and city representations were restored and Agusan del Sur elected a member for the regular parliament. The district was re-established ahead of the 1987 Philippine House of Representatives elections and continued to elect representatives until Agusan del Sur was reapportioned in 2008 and which took effect in 2010.

== List of members representing the district ==
=== House of Representatives (1945–1973) ===
Portrait	Member	Term of office		Legislature	Party	Electoral history	Constituent LGUs
Portrait	Member	Start	End	Legislature	Party	Electoral history	Constituent LGUs
District created June 17, 1967, from Agusan's at-large district.
	Democrito Plaza	December 30, 1969	January 17, 1973	7th Congress	Nacionalista	Elected in 1969. Term cut short upon the ratification of a new Constitution.	1969–1973; Bayugan, Bunawan, Esperanza, La Paz, Loreto, Prosperidad, Rosario, San Francisco, San Luis, Santa Josefa, Talacogon, Trento, Veruela
District dissolved into the nine-seat Region X's at-large district for the Interim Batasang Pambansa.

=== 1971 Constitutional Convention (1971–1972) ===
Seat A						Seat B						Legislature	Constituent LGUs
Portrait	Member	Term of office		Party	Electoral history	Portrait	Member	Term of office		Party	Electoral history	Legislature	Constituent LGUs
Portrait	Member	Start	End	Party	Electoral history	Portrait	Member	Start	End	Party	Electoral history	Legislature	Constituent LGUs
	Vicente Guzman	June 1, 1971	November 29, 1972	Nonpartisan	Elected in 1970.		Lamberto Mordeno	June 1, 1971	November 29, 1972	Nonpartisan	Elected in 1970.	1971 Constitutional Convention	1971–1972; Bayugan, Bunawan, Esperanza, La Paz, Loreto, Prosperidad, Rosario, San Francisco, San Luis, Santa Josefa, Talacogon, Trento, Veruela

=== Batasang Pambansa (1978–1986) ===
Portrait	Member	Term of office		Legislature	Party	Electoral history	Constituent LGUs
Portrait	Member	Start	End	Legislature	Party	Electoral history	Constituent LGUs
District re-created February 1, 1984.
	Democrito Plaza	June 30, 1984	March 25, 1986	Regular Batasang Pambansa	KBL	Elected in 1984.	1984–1986; Bayugan, Bunawan, Esperanza, La Paz, Loreto, Prosperidad, Rosario, San Francisco, San Luis, Santa Josefa, Sibagat, Talacogon, Trento, Veruela

=== House of Representatives (1987–present) ===
Portrait	Member	Term of office		Legislature	Party	Electoral history	Constituent LGUs
Portrait	Member	Start	End	Legislature	Party	Electoral history	Constituent LGUs
District re-created February 2, 1987.
	Democrito Plaza	June 30, 1987	June 30, 1992	8th Congress	UNIDO (Nacionalista)	Elected in 1987.	1987–2010; Bayugan, Bunawan, Esperanza, La Paz, Loreto, Prosperidad, Rosario, San Francisco, San Luis, Santa Josefa, Sibagat, Talacogon, Trento, Veruela
	Democrito Plaza	June 30, 1987	June 30, 1992	8th Congress	LDP	Elected in 1987.	1987–2010; Bayugan, Bunawan, Esperanza, La Paz, Loreto, Prosperidad, Rosario, San Francisco, San Luis, Santa Josefa, Sibagat, Talacogon, Trento, Veruela
	Ceferino Paredes Jr.	June 30, 1992	June 30, 1998	9th Congress	NPC (Pagtinabangay)	Elected in 1992.	1987–2010; Bayugan, Bunawan, Esperanza, La Paz, Loreto, Prosperidad, Rosario, San Francisco, San Luis, Santa Josefa, Sibagat, Talacogon, Trento, Veruela
	Ceferino Paredes Jr.	June 30, 1992	June 30, 1998	10th Congress	Lakas	Re-elected in 1995.	1987–2010; Bayugan, Bunawan, Esperanza, La Paz, Loreto, Prosperidad, Rosario, San Francisco, San Luis, Santa Josefa, Sibagat, Talacogon, Trento, Veruela
	Alex Bascug	June 30, 1998	June 30, 2001	11th Congress	LAMMP	Elected in 1998.	1987–2010; Bayugan, Bunawan, Esperanza, La Paz, Loreto, Prosperidad, Rosario, San Francisco, San Luis, Santa Josefa, Sibagat, Talacogon, Trento, Veruela
	Rodolfo Plaza	June 30, 2001	June 30, 2010	12th Congress	LDP	Elected in 2001.	1987–2010; Bayugan, Bunawan, Esperanza, La Paz, Loreto, Prosperidad, Rosario, San Francisco, San Luis, Santa Josefa, Sibagat, Talacogon, Trento, Veruela
	Rodolfo Plaza	June 30, 2001	June 30, 2010	13th Congress	NPC	Re-elected in 2004.	1987–2010; Bayugan, Bunawan, Esperanza, La Paz, Loreto, Prosperidad, Rosario, San Francisco, San Luis, Santa Josefa, Sibagat, Talacogon, Trento, Veruela
	Rodolfo Plaza	June 30, 2001	June 30, 2010	14th Congress	NPC	Re-elected in 2007.	1987–2010; Bayugan, Bunawan, Esperanza, La Paz, Loreto, Prosperidad, Rosario, San Francisco, San Luis, Santa Josefa, Sibagat, Talacogon, Trento, Veruela
District dissolved into Agusan del Sur's 1st and 2nd districts.

== Election results ==
=== 1984 ===
1984 Philippine parliamentary election in Agusan del Sur
Party	Candidate	Votes	%
KBL	Democrito Plaza	54,307	49.76
Mindanao Alliance	Ceferino Paredes Jr.	23,088	21.16
UNIDO	Vicente Guzman	15,679	14.37
Liberal	Marcelino Arias	8,498	7.79
Nacionalista	Mariano Cerna Jr.	6,227	5.71
Independent	Timoteo Lerio Sr.	907	0.83
People's Party	Roland Doncillo	431	0.39

=== 1992 ===
1992 Philippine House of Representatives elections in Agusan del Sur
Party	Candidate	Votes	%
NPC–Pagtinabangay	Ceferino Paredes Jr.	47,255	51.11
LP–PDP	Generoso Sansaet	40,301	43.59
Lakas	Ferdinand Ebarle	3,493	3.78
KBL–Pagtinabangay	Bruno Aparri	1,260	1.36
KBL	Viador Viajar	60	0.06
Independent	Eliseo Capadocia	51	0.06
Pag-asa ng Bayan	Marietta Juyo	31	0.03
Total votes		92,451	100.00
NPC gain from LDP			

=== 1995 ===
1995 Philippine House of Representatives elections in Agusan del Sur
Party	Candidate	Votes	%
Lakas	Ceferino Paredes Jr. (incumbent)	55,820	49.51
LDP	Generoso Sansaet	55,147	48.91
Nacionalista	Dominador Calonia	1,778	1.58
Total votes		112,745	100.00
Lakas hold			

=== 1998 ===
1998 Philippine House of Representatives elections in Agusan del Sur
Party	Candidate	Votes	%
LAMMP	Alex Bascug	60,823	41.34
Independent	Generoso Sansaet	40,714	27.67
Lakas	Timoteo Prochina	35,323	24.01
Independent	Tyrone Power Calo	6,148	4.18
Nacionalista	Roberto Calangi	2,259	1.54
KBL	Bienvenido Cebuala	1,690	1.15
Liberal	Roberto Ausmolo	180	0.12
Total votes		147,137	100.00
LAMMP gain from Lakas			

== See also ==
- Legislative districts of Agusan del Sur
