= Agusan del Sur's 2nd congressional district =

House of Representatives of the Philippines legislative district

- Constituency for the House of Representatives of the Philippines
- Map
- Location of Agusan del Sur within the Philippines
- Province: Agusan del Sur
- Region: Caraga
- Population: 373,363 (2020)
- Electorate: 230,722 (2022)
- Major settlements: Bunawan, La Paz, Loreto, Rosario, San Francisco, Santa Josefa, Trento, Veruela
- Area: 5,516.55 km^{2} (2,129.95 sq mi)

Current constituency
- Created: 2008
- Representative: Eddiebong Plaza
- Political party: NUP
- Congressional bloc: Majority

Agusan del Sur's 2nd congressional district is one of the two congressional district of the Philippines in the province of Agusan del Sur. It has been represented in the House of Representatives of the Philippines since 2010. Previously included in Agusan del Sur's 2nd congressional district from 1987 to 2010, it encompasses the southern part of the province, bordering the Davao Region. It is currently represented in the 20th Congress by Eddiebong Plaza of the National Unity Party.

== Recent election results from province-wide races ==
Year	Office	Results
2022	President	Leni Robredo (Independent) 44.09%
2022	Vice President	Sara Duterte (Lakas) 90.15%
2022	Governor	Santiago Cane Jr. (NUP) 100.00%
2025	Governor	Santiago Cane Jr. (NUP) 84.41%

== List of members representing the district ==
=== House of Representatives (1987–present) ===
No.	Portrait	Member	Term of office		Legislature	Party	Electoral history	Constituent LGUs
No.	Portrait	Member	Start	End	Legislature	Party	Electoral history	Constituent LGUs
District created October 20, 2008, from Agusan del Sur's at-large district.
1		Evelyn Plaza-Mellana	June 30, 2010	June 30, 2019	15th Congress	Lakas	Elected in 2010.	2010–present Bunawan, La Paz, Loreto, Rosario, San Francisco, Santa Josefa, Trento, Veruela
1		Evelyn Plaza-Mellana	June 30, 2010	June 30, 2019	16th Congress	NUP	Re-elected in 2013.	2010–present Bunawan, La Paz, Loreto, Rosario, San Francisco, Santa Josefa, Trento, Veruela
1		Evelyn Plaza-Mellana	June 30, 2010	June 30, 2019	17th Congress	PDP–Laban	Re-elected in 2016.	2010–present Bunawan, La Paz, Loreto, Rosario, San Francisco, Santa Josefa, Trento, Veruela
2		Eddiebong Plaza	June 30, 2019	Incumbent	18th Congress	NUP	Elected in 2019.	2010–present Bunawan, La Paz, Loreto, Rosario, San Francisco, Santa Josefa, Trento, Veruela
2		Eddiebong Plaza	June 30, 2019	Incumbent	19th Congress	NUP	Re-elected in 2022.	2010–present Bunawan, La Paz, Loreto, Rosario, San Francisco, Santa Josefa, Trento, Veruela
2		Eddiebong Plaza	June 30, 2019	Incumbent	20th Congress	NUP	Re-elected in 2025.	2010–present Bunawan, La Paz, Loreto, Rosario, San Francisco, Santa Josefa, Trento, Veruela

== Election results ==
=== 2010 ===
2010 Philippine House of Representatives election in Agusan del Sur
Party	Candidate	Votes	%
Lakas–Kampi	Evelyn Plaza-Mellana	61,018	55.08
Liberal	Ceferino Paredes Jr.	40,765	36.80
PDP–Laban	Reynaldo Quijada	7,630	6.55
Independent	Bienvenido Cebuala	1,364	1.23
Valid ballots		110,777	87.70
Invalid or blank votes		15,530	12.30
Total votes		126,307	100.00
Lakas–Kampi win (new seat)			

=== 2013 ===
2013 Philippine House of Representatives election in Agusan del Sur
Party	Candidate	Votes	%
NUP	Evelyn Plaza-Mellana (incumbent)	(?)	—
NPC	Rodolfo Plaza	(?)	—
NUP hold			

=== 2016 ===
2016 Philippine House of Representatives election in Agusan del Sur
Party	Candidate	Votes	%
NUP	Evelyn Plaza-Mellana (incumbent)	(?)	—
NUP hold			

=== 2019 ===
2019 Philippine House of Representatives election in Agusan del Sur
Party	Candidate	Votes	%
NUP	Eddiebong Plaza	111,328	85.90
Independent	Dodge Corro	9,945	7.67
PDSP	Maximino Robles Jr.	8,329	6.43
Total votes		129,602	100.00
NUP gain from PDP–Laban			

=== 2022 ===
2022 Philippine House of Representatives election in Agusan del Sur
Party	Candidate	Votes	%
NUP	Eddiebong Plaza (incumbent)	144,042	100.00
Total votes		144,042	100.00
NUP hold			

=== 2025 ===
2025 Philippine House of Representatives election in Agusan del Sur
Party	Candidate	Votes	%
NUP	Eddiebong Plaza (incumbent)	130,965	100.00
Total votes		130,965	100.00
NUP hold			

== See also ==
- Legislative districts of Agusan del Sur
