= San Francisco, Agusan del Sur =

Municipality in Agusan del Sur, Philippines

San Francisco
- Municipality
- Municipality of San Francisco
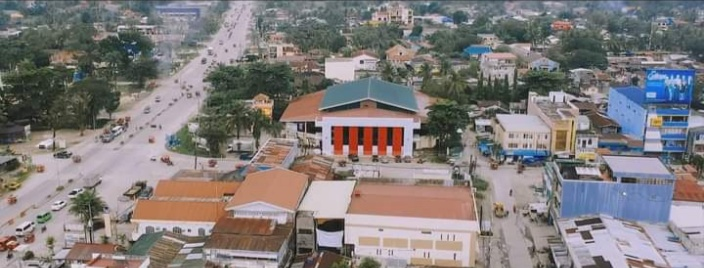
- Downtown area

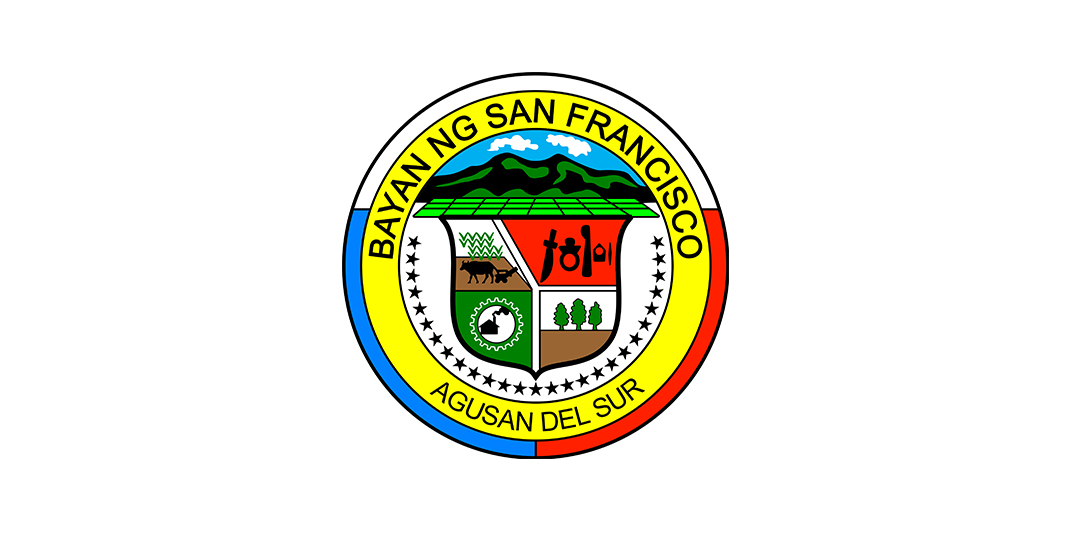
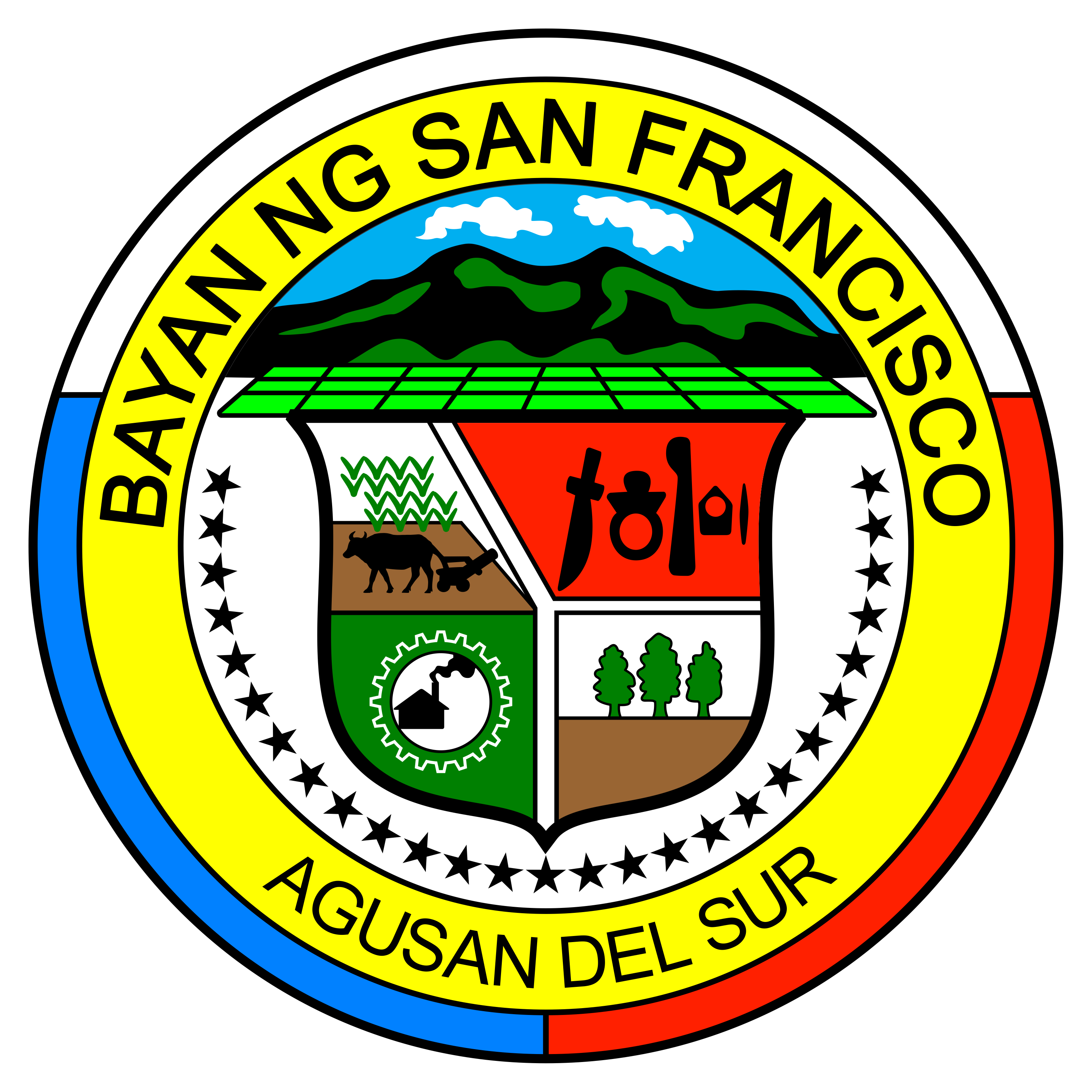
- Flag Seal

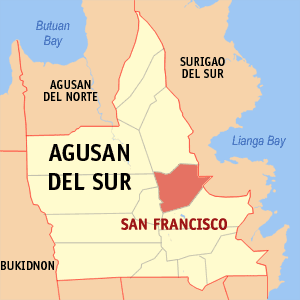
- Map of Agusan del Sur with San Francisco highlighted
- Interactive map of San Francisco
- Location within the Philippines
- Coordinates: 8°31′N 125°59′E
- Country: Philippines
- Region: Caraga
- Province: Agusan del Sur
- District: 2nd district
- Founded: June 21, 1959
- Barangays: 27 (see Barangays)

Government
  - Type: Sangguniang Bayan
  - Mayor: Grace Carmel Paredes-Bravo
  - Vice Mayor: Arth Ryan Palabrica
  - Representative: Adolph Edward G. Plaza
  - Electorate: 50,216 voters (2025)

Area
  - Total: 392.53 km^{2} (151.56 sq mi)
- Elevation: 89 m (292 ft)
- Highest elevation: 806 m (2,644 ft)
- Lowest elevation: 0 m (0 ft)

Population (2024 census)
  - Total: 79,718
  - Density: 203.09/km^{2} (525.99/sq mi)
  - Households: 18,945

Economy
  - Income class: 1st municipal income class
  - Poverty incidence: 21.39% (2023)
  - Revenue: ₱ 526.7 million (2024)
  - Assets: ₱ 2,544 million (2024)
  - Expenditure: ₱ 512.6 million (2024)
  - Liabilities: ₱ 775.7 million (2024)

Service provider
  - Electricity: Agusan del Sur Electric Cooperative (ASELCO)
- Time zone: UTC+8 (PST)
- ZIP code: 8501
- PSGC: 1600308000
- IDD : area code: +63 (0)85
- Native languages: Agusan; Butuanon; Cebuano; Higaonon; Tagalog
- Website: www.sfads.gov.ph

San Francisco, officially the Municipality of San Francisco (Cebuano: Lungsod sa San Francisco; Tagalog: Bayan ng San Francisco), is a municipality in the province of Agusan del Sur, Philippines. According to the 2024 census, it has a population of 79,718 people.

The town serves as the center of trade and commerce in the province of Agusan del Sur. In 2013, San Francisco topped first as the "Most Competitive Municipality in the Philippines in 2012" according to the National Competitiveness Council (NCC) from out of the 163 first-class municipalities covered by their index.

The protected area of the Agusan Marsh Wildlife Sanctuary can also be reached in San Francisco thru the Barangays Caimpugan and New Visayas.

The town is known for the gigantic Toog Tree of Alegria, which is the most sacred tribal tree for many of the Indigenous peoples of San Francisco. The town is also popular for its Irosin stone crafts, which has been the cottage industry of many Indigenous families in the area for hundreds of years. Due to the town's commendable folk arts and crafts made in stone, many scholars have suggested for its nomination in the UNESCO Creative Cities Network.

The town's name is sometimes colloquially shortened to "San France" or alternately spelled "San Franz" and "San Frans".

== History ==
The birth of San Francisco is associated with the history of Agusan and Surigao del Sur. Before San Francisco became a municipality, it was part of the District of Gibong, which was then governed by Deputy Governor Francisco Cataylo. During this period, the district comprised the barrios of Santa Ana, Caimpugan, Ebro, Borbon, La Caridad, Prosperidad, Azpetea and Los Arcos, with Santa Ana the seat of government. Like other barrios, Santa Ana comprised several sitios, including Sitio Hagpa, which was the site of the present day San Francisco. Hagpa was coined from a Manobo word for "swampy" as the sitio was a small village nestled along the Adlayan River and inhabited by Manobo tribes.

The opening of the province of Agusan del Sur to most parts of Mindanao came during the government of President Ramon Magsaysay who ordered the first road survey to be conducted by the Department of Highway in 1952. In early 1954, road construction began paving the way for the institution of public land subdivision and the in-migration of different local tribes and settlers from the various provinces of Mindanao, Visayas and Luzon.

Hagpa was later renamed San Francisco in honor of Deputy District Governor Francisco Cataylo. In early 1955, the first local government was established as San Francisco was created as a Municipal District. Francisca Tesoro Samson was appointed as the first Municipal District Mayor by then Provincial Governor Felixberto Dagani. On June 21, 1959, through Republic Act No. 2518, San Francisco was officially created into a regular municipality of the Province of Agusan. In the same year, the first local officials of the municipality were elected with Atty. Paquito Fuentes as the first elected municipal mayor, who served for three consecutive terms of office. He was succeeded by Engr. Bienvenido Y. Tumulak Sr. and was succeeded by his vice mayor, Cresencio Ausmolo who stayed in office by operation of law during the latter half-portion of his last term.

Eight years after its creation as a regular municipality, on June 17, 1967, through Republic Act No. 4979, the province of Agusan was divided into the provinces of Agusan del Norte and Agusan del Sur, in which San Francisco was part of the latter. The continued growth of Agusan del Sur also saw the development of the municipality of San Francisco. Its growing population later paved the way for the creation of the municipality of Rosario through Republic Act No. 5760 approved by President Diosdado Macapagal on June 21, 1969, just two years after the creation of Agusan del Sur. As a result, the several barrios of San Francisco including Bayugan III, Wasi-an, Santa Cruz, Cabawan, Cabantao, Marfil and Tagbayagan were incorporated in the newly created municipality. The barrios of Buenasuerte, Caimpogan, Pasta, Lapinigan, Ebro, New Visayas, Bayugan II, Borbon, Tagapua, Pisaan, Santa Ana, Hubang, Alegria, San Isidro, Das-agan, Ladgadan, Lucac, Bitan-agan and Poblacion consisting of five barrios as stated in PD No. 86 dated December 31, 1972, remained to form part of the 39,253-hectare Municipality of San Francisco. The barrios of Rizal, Ormaca, Mate and Karaos were later created and added to form final 27 barangays of the present day San Francisco.

== Geography ==
According to the Philippine Statistics Authority, the municipality has a land area of 392.53 square kilometres (151.56 sq mi) constituting 3.93% of the 9,989.52-square-kilometre- (3,856.98 sq mi) total area of Agusan del Sur.

San Francisco is also the site of the Mt. Magdiwata Watershed and Forest Reserve which was established by Proclamation No. 282 issued on October 23, 1993. Mount Magdiwata itself is 633 meters (2,077 ft) high. It provides forest cover for the town although it was historically a site for logging.

=== Climate ===
Climate data for San Francisco, Agusan del Sur
Month	Jan	Feb	Mar	Apr	May	Jun	Jul	Aug	Sep	Oct	Nov	Dec	Year
Mean daily maximum °C (°F)	27 (81)	27 (81)	28 (82)	29 (84)	29 (84)	29 (84)	29 (84)	30 (86)	30 (86)	29 (84)	28 (82)	28 (82)	29 (83)
Mean daily minimum °C (°F)	22 (72)	22 (72)	22 (72)	23 (73)	23 (73)	23 (73)	23 (73)	23 (73)	23 (73)	23 (73)	23 (73)	23 (73)	23 (73)
Average precipitation mm (inches)	152 (6.0)	116 (4.6)	90 (3.5)	68 (2.7)	88 (3.5)	96 (3.8)	78 (3.1)	73 (2.9)	70 (2.8)	96 (3.8)	125 (4.9)	132 (5.2)	1,184 (46.8)
Average rainy days	20.8	17.7	18.5	17.2	20.8	22.5	22.5	22.7	22.0	23.7	22.5	19.9	250.8
Source: Meteoblue (modeled/calculated data, not measured locally)

=== Barangays ===
San Francisco is politically subdivided into 27 barangays. Each barangay consists of puroks while some have sitios.

PSGC	Barangay	Population			±% p.a.	
		2024		2010		
160308001	Alegria	9.2%	7,310	6,053	▴	1.32%
160308015	Barangay 1 (Poblacion)	7.4%	5,902	4,741	▴	1.53%
160308016	Barangay 2 (Poblacion)	3.1%	2,506	2,993	▾	−1.23%
160308017	Barangay 3 (Poblacion)	4.6%	3,642	3,315	▴	0.66%
160308018	Barangay 4 (Poblacion)	3.7%	2,939	3,250	▾	−0.70%
160308019	Barangay 5 (Poblacion)	6.6%	5,239	4,926	▴	0.43%
160308002	Bayugan 2	5.8%	4,644	4,896	▾	−0.37%
160308025	Bitan-agan	1.3%	1,046	1,079	▾	−0.22%
160308003	Borbon	3.6%	2,850	2,696	▴	0.39%
160308026	Buenasuerte	2.0%	1,566	1,766	▾	−0.83%
160308005	Caimpugan	2.0%	1,590	1,751	▾	−0.67%
160308027	Das-agan	2.3%	1,824	1,803	▴	0.08%
160308006	Ebro	1.7%	1,325	1,496	▾	−0.84%
160308007	Hubang	4.0%	3,166	2,659	▴	1.22%
160308028	Karaus	3.9%	3,148	2,686	▴	1.11%
160308029	Ladgadan	1.2%	981	992	▾	−0.08%
160308008	Lapinigan	6.5%	5,150	4,627	▴	0.75%
160308009	Lucac	1.6%	1,294	966	▴	2.05%
160308010	Mate	1.9%	1,497	1,616	▾	−0.53%
160308011	New Visayas	1.7%	1,334	1,735	▾	−1.81%
160308030	Ormaca	1.0%	805	793	▴	0.10%
160308012	Pasta	3.8%	3,061	3,429	▾	−0.78%
160308013	Pisa-an	4.3%	3,429	2,611	▴	1.91%
160308020	Rizal	1.1%	904	1,331	▾	−2.65%
160308021	San Isidro	4.7%	3,737	3,089	▴	1.33%
160308022	Santa Ana	1.6%	1,256	1,283	▾	−0.15%
160308024	Tagapua	3.0%	2,397	2,404	▾	−0.02%
	Total		79,718	70,986	▴	0.81%

== Demographics ==
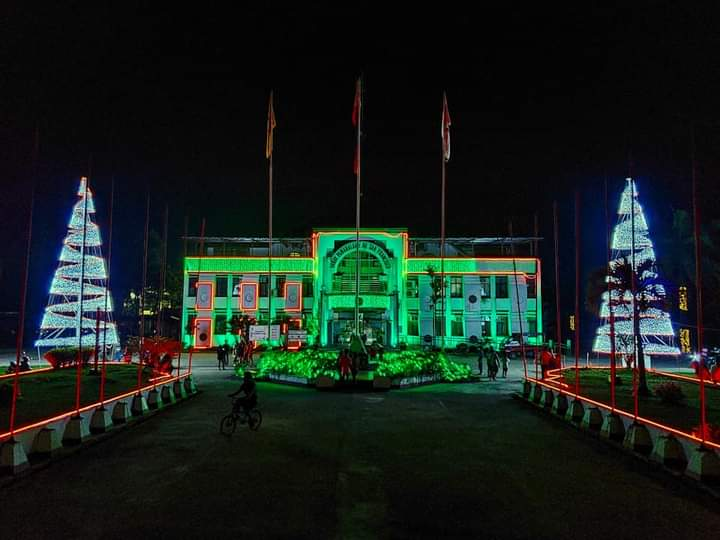
Municipal Hall

Population census of San Francisco
Year	Pop.	±% p.a.
1939	4,156	—
1948	5,434	+3.02%
1960	16,535	+9.72%
1970	17,636	+0.65%
1975	19,097	+1.61%
1980	27,153	+7.29%
1990	43,878	+4.92%
1995	50,844	+2.80%
2000	56,968	+2.47%
2007	62,881	+1.37%
2010	70,986	+4.51%
2015	74,542	+0.94%
2020	80,760	+1.70%
2024	79,718	−0.31%
Source: Philippine Statistics Authority

In the 2024 census, San Francisco had a population of 79,718. The population density was 200 inhabitants per square kilometre (520/sq mi).

== Economy ==
Poverty incidence of San Francisco (%)

Source: Philippine Statistics Authority

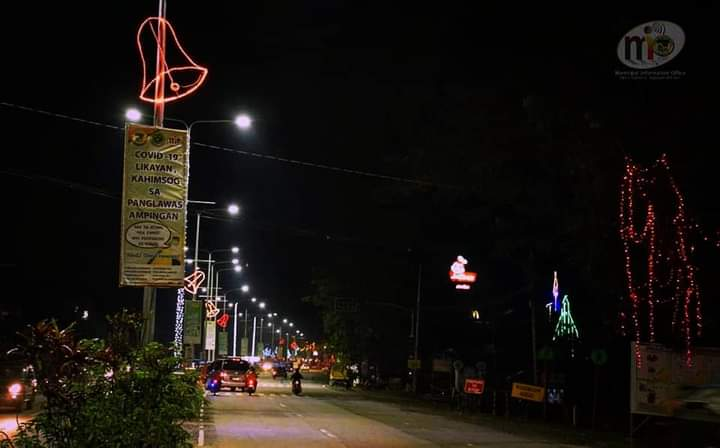
San Francisco highway during nighttime with Christmas decors at the street lights.

San Francisco is the "Commercial Capital of Agusan del Sur", serving as the primary commercial and service center in the province of Agusan del Sur. Situated within the crossroad leading to other production centers in the region, San Francisco serves as the primary distribution point of goods and people for the province. The presence of malls, hotels, restaurants, communication and transportation facilities makes San Francisco the training convention center of the province and a favored place for tourists to stay with Mount Magdiwata boosting its tourism sector.

== Transportation ==
San Francisco has a bus terminal named San Francisco Transport Terminal. All major buses including Bachelor Express, Davao Metro Shuttle and GO Mindanao bound for Davao, Butuan, Surigao, Tandag and Mangagoy. Philtranco also serve San Francisco, to and from Pasay.

San Francisco also have another public transportation called jeepney and multicab, their destination is Prosperidad, Rosario, Talacogon and Barobo.

Public Utility Van (PUV) also served San Francisco, bound for Davao, Butuan, Tandag, Mangagoy and Tagum.

== Education ==
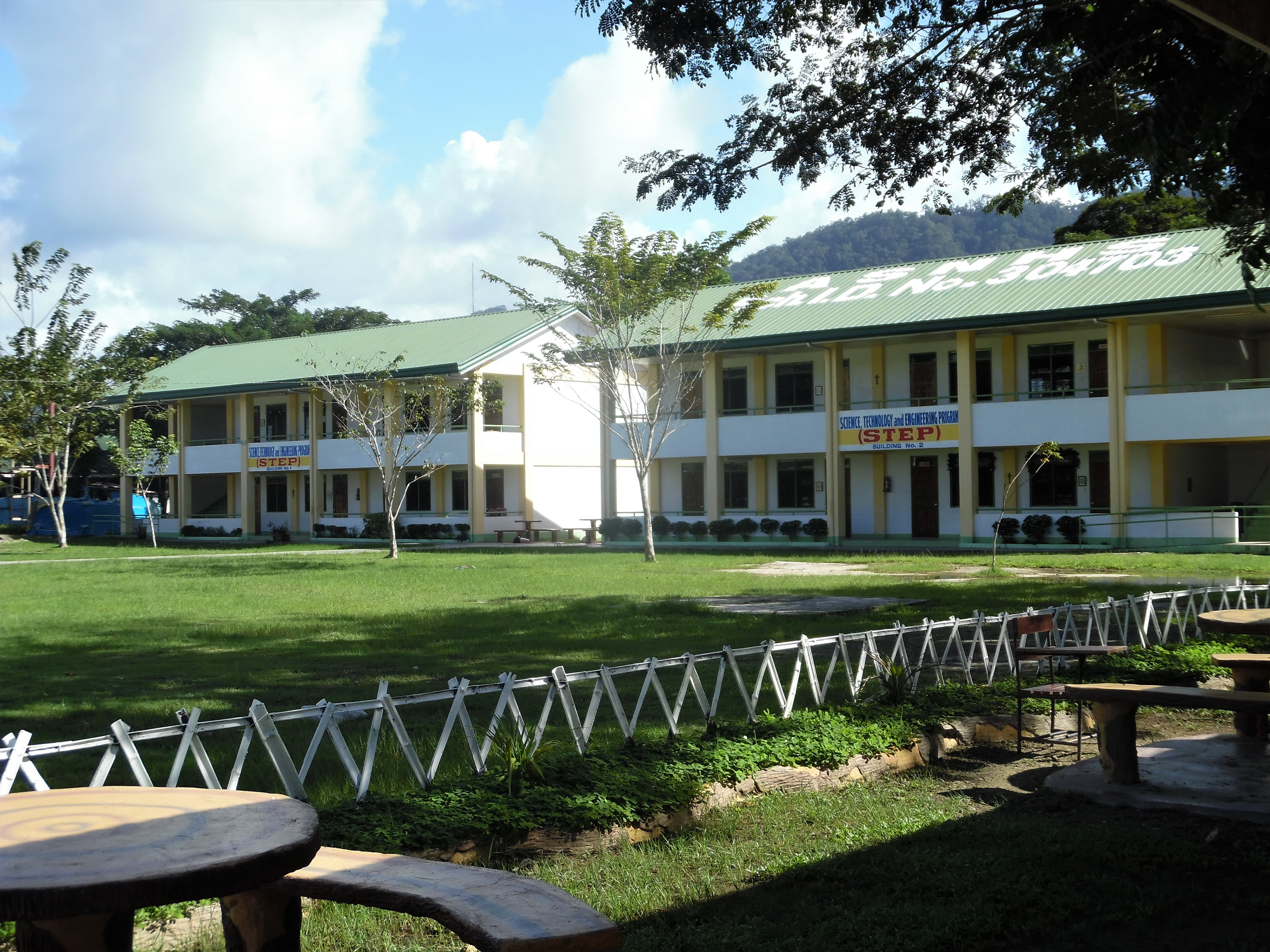
Agusan del Sur National High School

List of public and private educational institutions:

- Agusan del Sur National High School
- ACLC College of San Francisco
- Bayugan 2 National High School (formerly Bayugan 2 Integrated School)
- Bukidnon State University (San Francisco - External Studies Center)
- D.O. Plaza National High School
- Lapinigan National High School
- Mount Carmel College of San Francisco
- Saint Francis Xavier College
- San Francisco Colleges
- Southway College of Technology
