= Alfel Bascug =

Filipino politician

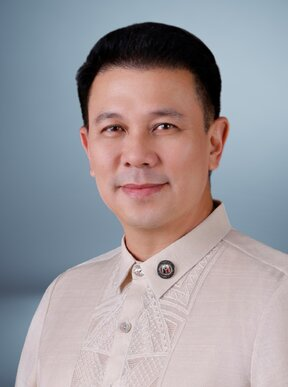
- Official portrait, 2025

Member of the Philippine House of Representatives from Agusan del Sur's 1st District
- Incumbent
- Assumed office June 30, 2019
- Preceded by: Maria Valentina Plaza

Personal details
- Born: Alfelito M. Bascug; September 8, 1972 (age 54) Butuan, Agusan del Norte, Philippines
- Party: National Unity Party

Alfelito "Alfel" Maraon Bascug is a Filipino politician. He currently serves as a member of the Philippine House of Representatives representing the 1st District of Agusan del Sur.

== Political career ==
=== House of Representatives (2019–present) ===
House of Representatives of the Philippines
Preceded by Maria Valentina Plaza	Representative, 1st District of Agusan del Sur; 2025–present	Incumbent
