= Agusan del Sur's 1st congressional district =

House of Representatives of the Philippines legislative district

- Constituency for the House of Representatives of the Philippines
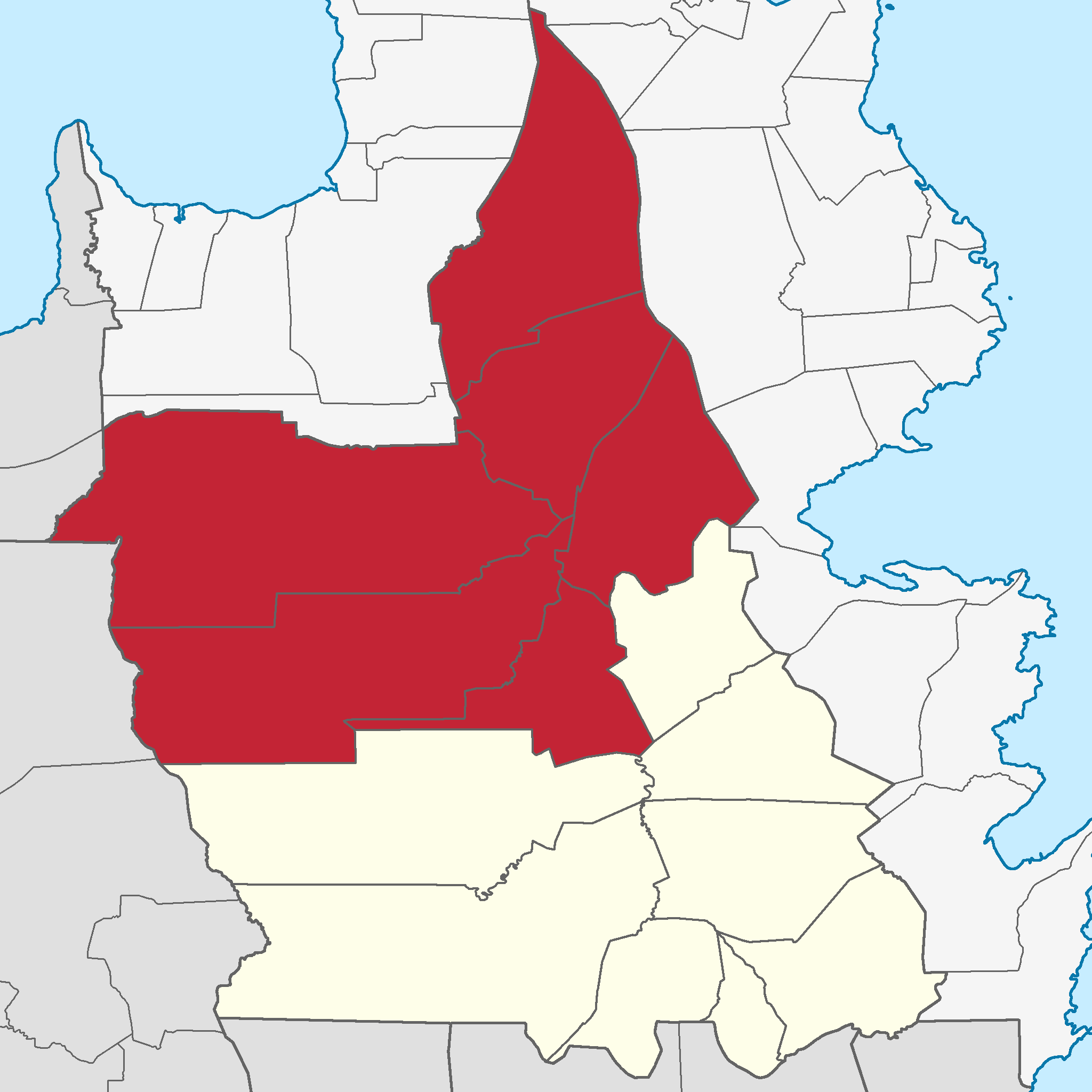
- Map of Agusan del Sur's 1st congressional district

- Location of Agusan del Sur within the Philippines
- Province: Agusan del Sur
- Region: Caraga
- Population: 366,004 (2020)
- Electorate: 211,906 (2022)
- Major settlements: Bayugan, Esperanza, Prosperidad, San Luis, Sibagat, Talacogon
- Area: 4,472.97 km^{2} (1,727.02 sq mi)

Current constituency
- Created: 2008
- Representative: Alfel Bascug
- Political party: NUP
- Congressional bloc: Majority

Agusan del Sur's 1st congressional district is one of the two congressional district of the Philippines in the province of Agusan del Sur. It has been represented in the House of Representatives of the Philippines since 2010. Previously included in Agusan del Sur's at-large congressional district from 1987 to 2010, it encompasses the northern part of the province, bordering Agusan del Norte. It is currently represented in the 20th Congress by Alfel Bascug of the National Unity Party.

== Recent election results from province-wide races ==
Year	Office	Results
2022	President	Bongbong Marcos (PFP) 46.67%
2022	Vice President	Sara Duterte (Lakas) 88.75%
2022	Governor	Santiago Cane Jr. (NUP) 100.00%
2025	Governor	Santiago Cane Jr. (NUP) 87.07%

== List of members representing the district ==
=== House of Representatives (1987–present) ===
No.	Portrait	Member	Term of office		Legislature	Party	Electoral history	Constituent LGUs
No.	Portrait	Member	Start	End	Legislature	Party	Electoral history	Constituent LGUs
District created October 20, 2008, from Agusan del Sur's at-large district.
1		Maria Valentina Plaza	June 30, 2010	June 30, 2019	15th Congress	Lakas	Elected in 2010.	2010–present Bayugan, Esperanza, Prosperidad, San Luis, Sibagat, Talacogon
1		Maria Valentina Plaza	June 30, 2010	June 30, 2019	16th Congress	NUP	Re-elected in 2013.	2010–present Bayugan, Esperanza, Prosperidad, San Luis, Sibagat, Talacogon
1		Maria Valentina Plaza	June 30, 2010	June 30, 2019	17th Congress	PDP–Laban	Re-elected in 2016.	2010–present Bayugan, Esperanza, Prosperidad, San Luis, Sibagat, Talacogon
2		Alfel Bascug	June 30, 2019	Incumbent	18th Congress	NUP	Elected in 2019.	2010–present Bayugan, Esperanza, Prosperidad, San Luis, Sibagat, Talacogon
2		Alfel Bascug	June 30, 2019	Incumbent	19th Congress	NUP	Re-elected in 2022.	2010–present Bayugan, Esperanza, Prosperidad, San Luis, Sibagat, Talacogon
2		Alfel Bascug	June 30, 2019	Incumbent	20th Congress	NUP	Re-elected in 2025.	2010–present Bayugan, Esperanza, Prosperidad, San Luis, Sibagat, Talacogon

== Election results ==
=== 2010 ===
2010 Philippine House of Representatives election in Agusan del Sur
Party	Candidate	Votes	%
Lakas–Kampi	Maria Valentina Plaza	75,986	65.25
Liberal	Roberto Aquino	40,464	34.75
Valid ballots		116,450	91.57
Invalid or blank votes		10,720	8.43
Total votes		127,170	100.00
Lakas–Kampi win (new seat)			

=== 2013 ===
2013 Philippine House of Representatives election in Agusan del Sur
Party	Candidate	Votes	%
NUP	Maria Valentina Plaza (incumbent)	(?)	—
Liberal	Roberto Aquino	(?)	—
NUP hold			

=== 2016 ===
2016 Philippine House of Representatives election in Agusan del Sur
Party	Candidate	Votes	%
NUP	Maria Valentina Plaza (incumbent)	(?)	—
NUP hold			

=== 2019 ===
2019 Philippine House of Representatives election in Agusan del Sur
Party	Candidate	Votes	%
NUP	Alfel Bascug	82,984	64.18
PDSP	Democrito Plaza III	46,307	35.82
Valid ballots		129,291	80.83
Invalid or blank votes		30,657	19.17
Total votes		159,948	100.00
NUP gain from PDP–Laban			

=== 2022 ===
2022 Philippine House of Representatives election in Agusan del Sur
Party	Candidate	Votes	%
NUP	Alfel Bascug (incumbent)	119,773	100.00
Total votes		119,773	100.00
NUP hold			

=== 2025 ===
2025 Philippine House of Representatives election in Agusan del Sur
Party	Candidate	Votes	%
NUP	Alfel Bascug (incumbent)	110,340	100.00
Total votes		110,340	100.00
NUP hold			

== See also ==
- Legislative districts of Agusan del Sur
