= Alex Bascug =

Filipino physician and politician (born 1936)

Member of the Philippine House of Representatives for Agusan del Sur's at-large district
- In office June 30, 1998 – June 30, 2001
- Preceded by: Ceferino Paredes Jr.
- Succeeded by: Rodolfo Plaza

Governor of Agusan del Sur
- In office September 3, 1995 – June 30, 1998
- Vice Governor: Virginia Getes
- Preceded by: Democrito Plaza
- Succeeded by: Valentina Plaza

Vice Governor of Agusan del Sur
- In office June 30, 1992 – September 3, 1995
- Governor: Democrito Plaza
- Preceded by: Vicente Encendencia
- Succeeded by: Virginia Getes

Personal details
- Born: July 9, 1936 (age 90)
- Party: LAMMP (1997–2001)
- Other political affiliations: LDP (1991–1997)
- Spouse: Felicidad Maraon

Alex Gonzales Bascug (born July 9, 1936) is a Filipino physician and politician who served as the representative for Agusan del Sur's at-large congressional district in the Philippine House of Representatives from 1998 to 2001. He previously served as vice governor of Agusan del Sur from 1992 to 1995 and as governor from 1995 to 1998.

== Vice Governor of Agusan del Sur (1992–1995) ==
Bascug's first known entry into politics was in 1992, when he ran as the vice gubernatorial running mate of incumbent representative Democrito Plaza, who ran for governor of Agusan del Sur under the Laban ng Demokratikong Pilipino ticket. Both won the election, and Bascug served his first term until 1995.

== Governor of Agusan del Sur (1995–1998) ==
Plaza and Bascug were re-elected in 1995 for a second term as governor and vice governor, respectively. However, Plaza died on September 2, 1995, two months into his new term. Bascug succeeded him as governor the following day and served until 1998.

== House of Representatives (1998–2001) ==
Bascug was elected to the House of Representatives in 1998, representing Agusan del Sur's lone congressional district. He defeated three-time candidate Generoso Sansaet and five other candidates, garnering 60,823 votes (41.34%). During the 11th Congress, he served as vice chairman of the House Committee on Health and as a member of the committees on Agriculture, Basic Education, Ecology, National Defense, Rural Development, Trade and Industry, and Tourism.

Bascug was among 30 representatives from Mindanao who signed the impeachment complaint against President Joseph Estrada on November 13, 2000.

== Electoral history ==
Electoral history of Alex Bascug
Year	Office	Party	Votes received				Result
Year	Office	Party	Total	%	P.	Swing	Result
1992	Vice Governor of Agusan del Sur	LDP	—N/a	—N/a	1st	—N/a	Won
1995	Vice Governor of Agusan del Sur	LDP	—N/a	—N/a	1st	—N/a	Won
1998	Representative (Agusan del Sur)	LAMMP	60,823	41.34%	1st	—N/a	Won

House of Representatives of the Philippines
Preceded by Ceferino Paredes Jr.	Member of the Philippine House of Representatives for Agusan del Sur's at-large district 1998–2001	Succeeded by Rodolfo Plaza
Political offices
Preceded by Democrito Plaza	Governor of Agusan del Sur; 1995–1998	Succeeded by Valentina Plaza
Preceded by Vicente Encendencia	Vice Governor of Agusan del Sur; 1992–1995	Succeeded by Virginia Getes
