= Philippine House Committee on Natural Resources =

Standing committee of the House of Representatives of the Philippines

Committee on Natural Resources
- 20th Congress

History
- New session started: To convene on July 28, 2025

Leadership
- Chairman: Vacant
- Minority Leader: Vacant

Website
- Committee on Natural Resources

The Philippine House Committee on Natural Resources, or House Natural Resources Committee is a standing committee of the Philippine House of Representatives.

== Jurisdiction ==
As prescribed by House Rules, the committee's jurisdiction is on natural resources, except energy and fisheries resources, which includes the following:

- Exploration, conservation, management and utilization
- Forests, parks and wildlife
- Lands of the public domain
- Marine resources
- Mines and minerals

== Members, 20th Congress ==
As of June 30, 2025, all committee membership positions are vacant until the House convenes for its first regular session on July 28.

== Historical membership rosters ==
=== 18th Congress ===
Position	Members	Party	Province/City	District
Chairperson	Elpidio Barzaga Jr.	NUP	Cavite	4th
Vice Chairpersons	Junie Cua	PDP–Laban	Quirino	Lone
Vice Chairpersons	Allen Jesse Mangaoang	Nacionalista	Kalinga	Lone
Vice Chairpersons	Franz Alvarez	NUP	Palawan	1st
Vice Chairpersons	Alan 1 Ecleo	PDP–Laban	Dinagat Islands	Lone
Vice Chairpersons	Ma. Lourdes Acosta-Alba	Bukidnon Paglaum	Bukidnon	1st
Members for the Majority	Luisa Lloren Cuaresma	NUP	Nueva Vizcaya	Lone
Members for the Majority	Wilfredo Caminero	NUP	Cebu	2nd
Members for the Majority	Adolph Edward Plaza	NUP	Agusan del Sur	2nd
Members for the Majority	Julienne Baronda	NUP	Iloilo City	Lone
Members for the Majority	Alfelito Bascug	NUP	Agusan del Sur	1st
Members for the Majority	Diego Ty	NUP	Misamis Occidental	1st
Members for the Majority	Vicente Veloso III	NUP	Leyte	3rd
Members for the Majority	Elias Bulut Jr.	NPC	Apayao	Lone
Members for the Majority	Solomon Chungalao	NPC	Ifugao	Lone
Members for the Majority	Cheryl Deloso-Montalla	Liberal	Zambales	2nd
Members for the Majority	Abdullah Dimaporo	NPC	Lanao del Norte	2nd
Members for the Majority	Ciriaco Gato Jr.	NPC	Batanes	Lone
Members for the Majority	Gerardo Valmayor Jr.	NPC	Negros Occidental	1st
Members for the Majority	Noel Villanueva	NPC	Tarlac	3rd
Members for the Majority	Sandra Eriguel	NUP	La Union	2nd
Members for the Majority	Elizalde Co	AKO BICOL	Party-list	
Members for the Majority	Macnell Lusotan	MARINO	Party-list	
Members for the Majority	Shirlyn Bañas-Nograles	PDP–Laban	South Cotabato	1st
Members for the Majority	Josephine Ramirez-Sato	Liberal	Occidental Mindoro	Lone
Members for the Majority	Adriano Ebcas	AKO PADAYON	Party-list	
Members for the Majority	Amihilda Sangcopan	AMIN	Party-list	
Members for the Majority	Presley De Jesus	PHILRECA	Party-list	
Members for the Majority	Alfredo Garbin Jr.	AKO BICOL	Party-list	
Members for the Majority	Princess Rihan Sakaluran	NUP	Sultan Kudarat	1st
Members for the Majority	Christian Unabia	Lakas	Misamis Oriental	1st
Members for the Majority	Roger Mercado	Lakas	Southern Leyte	Lone
Members for the Minority	Irene Gay Saulog	KALINGA	Party-list	
Members for the Minority	Eufemia Cullamat	Bayan Muna	Party-list	
Members for the Minority	Arlene Brosas	GABRIELA	Party-list	
Members for the Minority	Argel Joseph Cabatbat	MAGSASAKA	Party-list	
Members for the Minority	Alex Advincula	NUP	Cavite	3rd

==== Vice Chairpersons ====
- Marissa Andaya (Note: Died on July 5, 2020.) (Camarines Sur–1st, NPC)
- Nestor Fongwan (Note: Died on December 18, 2019.) (Benguet–Lone, PDP–Laban)

== See also ==
- House of Representatives of the Philippines
- List of Philippine House of Representatives committees
- Department of Environment and Natural Resources
