= Maria Valentina Plaza =

Filipino politician

Maria Valentina Galido Plaza
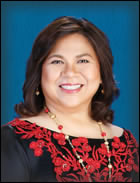
- Official portrait, 2013

Former Member of the Philippine House of Representatives from Agusan del Sur's 1st congressional district
- In office June 30, 2010 – June 30, 2019
- Preceded by: District established
- Succeeded by: Alfel Bascug

7th Governor of Agusan del Sur
- In office June 30, 2007 – June 30, 2010
- Vice Governor: Santiago Cane Jr.
- Preceded by: Eddiebong Plaza
- Succeeded by: Eddiebong Plaza

Personal details
- Born: June 1, 1967 (age 59) Pasay, Philippines
- Party: Independent (2019–present)
- Other political affiliations: PDSP (2018–2019); PDP–Laban (2015–2018); NUP (2011–2015); Lakas–CMD (until 2011)
- Education: University of the Philippines Los Baños (BS)

Maria Valentina Galido Plaza (born June 1, 1967) is a Filipino politician who as served as governor and representative of the first district of the province of Agusan del Sur. She was the province's second female governor.

== Early life and education ==
Plaza is the daughter of former governors Democrito Plaza and Valentina Plaza. She is also the sister of former governor Eddiebong Plaza and former congressman Rodolfo "Ompong" Plaza. She graduated from the University of the Philippines Los Baños with a degree in agricultural business.

== Political career ==
=== Governor ===
Although a neophyte, in 2007, Plaza chose to run for governor of Agusan del Sur with the help of her brother Eddiebong Plaza. She won as the second female governor after her mother.

=== Congresswoman ===
In the 2010 elections, Plaza was elected as the first representative of the newly created 1st district of the province of Agusan del Sur.
