= Santa Josefa =

Municipality in Agusan del Sur, Philippines

- Municipality
- Municipality of Santa Josefa
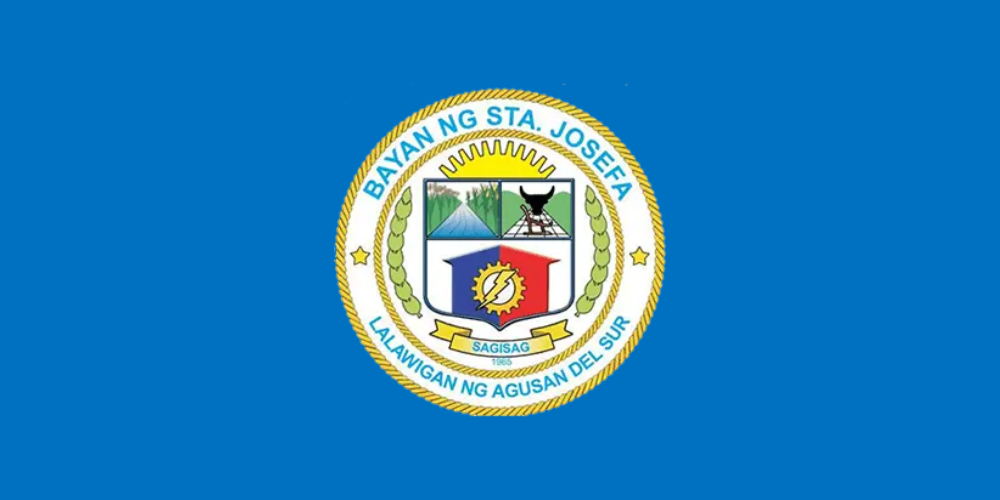
- Flag

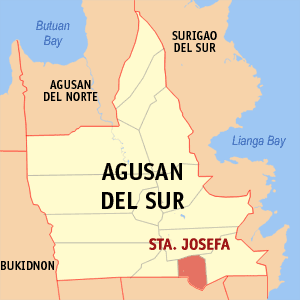
- Map of Agusan del Sur with Santa Josefa highlighted
- Interactive map of Santa Josefa
- Location within the Philippines
- Coordinates: 7°59′N 126°02′E
- Country: Philippines
- Region: Caraga
- Province: Agusan del Sur
- District: 2nd district
- Barangays: 11 (see Barangays)

Government
  - Type: Sangguniang Bayan
  - Mayor: Symond O. Caguiat
  - Vice Mayor: Richard M. Plaza
  - Representative: Adolph Edward G. Plaza
  - Electorate: 17,502 voters (2025)

Area
  - Total: 341.8 km^{2} (132.0 sq mi)
- Elevation: 82 m (269 ft)
- Highest elevation: 775 m (2,543 ft)
- Lowest elevation: 24 m (79 ft)

Population (2024 census)
  - Total: 24,667
  - Density: 72.17/km^{2} (186.9/sq mi)
  - Households: 6,343

Economy
  - Income class: 1st municipal income class
  - Poverty incidence: 19.12% (2023)
  - Revenue: ₱ 222.4 million (2024)
  - Assets: ₱ 703.3 million (2024)
  - Expenditure: ₱ 210.1 million (2024)
  - Liabilities: ₱ 189.6 million (2024)

Service provider
  - Electricity: Agusan del Sur Electric Cooperative (ASELCO)
- Time zone: UTC+8 (PST)
- ZIP code: 8512
- PSGC: 1600310000
- IDD : area code: +63 (0)85
- Native languages: Agusan; Butuanon; Cebuano; Higaonon; Tagalog

Santa Josefa, officially the Municipality of Santa Josefa (Cebuano: Lungsod sa Santa Josefa; Tagalog: Bayan ng Santa Josefa), is a municipality in the province of Agusan del Sur, Philippines. According to the 2024 census, it has a population of 24,667 people, making it the least populated town in the province.

== Geography ==
Santa Josefa is located at 7°59′N 126°02′E, making it the province's most southerly settlement.

According to the Philippine Statistics Authority, the municipality has a land area of 341.8 square kilometres (132.0 sq mi) constituting 3.42% of the 9,989.52-square-kilometre- (3,856.98 sq mi) total area of Agusan del Sur.

=== Climate ===
Climate data for Santa Josefa, Agusan del Sur
Month	Jan	Feb	Mar	Apr	May	Jun	Jul	Aug	Sep	Oct	Nov	Dec	Year
Mean daily maximum °C (°F)	27 (81)	27 (81)	27 (81)	29 (84)	29 (84)	29 (84)	30 (86)	30 (86)	30 (86)	30 (86)	29 (84)	28 (82)	29 (84)
Mean daily minimum °C (°F)	22 (72)	22 (72)	22 (72)	23 (73)	23 (73)	23 (73)	23 (73)	23 (73)	23 (73)	23 (73)	23 (73)	22 (72)	23 (73)
Average precipitation mm (inches)	105 (4.1)	80 (3.1)	58 (2.3)	39 (1.5)	62 (2.4)	75 (3.0)	69 (2.7)	62 (2.4)	59 (2.3)	71 (2.8)	69 (2.7)	69 (2.7)	818 (32)
Average rainy days	15.8	15.4	14.8	13.8	19.7	22.5	22.9	22.7	22.0	23.0	18.1	15.0	225.7
Source: Meteoblue

Santa Josefa is classified as Type II climate which has no dry season but with pronounced maximum rain period occurring from December to January.

=== Barangays ===
Santa Josefa is politically subdivided into 11 barangays. Each barangay consists of puroks while some have sitios.

PSGC	Barangay	Population			±% p.a.	
		2024		2010		
160310001	Angas	13.3%	3,271	3,119	▴	0.33%
160310002	Aurora	10.7%	2,651	2,396	▴	0.70%
160310003	Awao	9.0%	2,232	2,232	Steady	0.00%
160310010	Concepcion	4.3%	1,055	898	▴	1.12%
160310011	Pag-asa	4.5%	1,122	923	▴	1.36%
160310005	Patrocinio	9.1%	2,238	2,182	▴	0.18%
160310006	Poblacion	20.1%	4,962	4,783	▴	0.26%
160310007	San Jose	10.1%	2,486	2,315	▴	0.50%
160310008	Santa Isabel	9.6%	2,363	2,293	▴	0.21%
160310009	Sayon	10.6%	2,620	2,368	▴	0.70%
160310004	Tapaz	7.0%	1,729	1,647	▴	0.34%
	Total		24,667	25,156	▾	−0.14%

== Demographics ==
Population census of Santa Josefa
Year	Pop.	±% p.a.
1918	393	—
1939	663	+2.52%
1948	835	+2.60%
1960	1,687	+6.03%
1970	3,601	+7.87%
1975	4,972	+6.68%
1980	6,604	+5.84%
1990	11,392	+5.60%
1995	21,190	+12.33%
2000	22,730	+1.52%
2007	24,972	+1.31%
2010	25,156	+0.27%
2015	26,729	+1.16%
2020	26,432	−0.23%
2024	24,667	−1.65%
Source: Philippine Statistics Authority

In the 2024 census, Santa Josefa had a population of 24,667. The population density was 72 inhabitants per square kilometre (190/sq mi).

== Economy ==
Poverty incidence of Santa Josefa (%)

Source: Philippine Statistics Authority

Santa Josefa's main products are rice and corn.
