= Rodolfo Plaza =

Filipino politician

The Honorable Rodolfo Galido Plaza
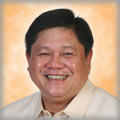

Member of the Philippine House of Representatives from Agusan del Sur
- In office June 30, 2001 – June 30, 2010
- Preceded by: Alex Bascug
- Succeeded by: Post dissolved (Note: He was succeeded by Maria Valentina Plaza (1st district) and Evelyn "Bebs" P. Mellana (2nd district))

Personal details
- Born: Rodolfo Galido Plaza; March 13, 1958 (age 68)
- Party: NPC (2001-present)
- Other political affiliations: LDP (until 2001)
- Parent(s): Democrito Plaza; Valentina G. Plaza
- Relatives: Adolph Edward Plaza (brother); Maria Valentina Plaza (sister)
- Occupation: Politician

Rodolfo "Ompong" Galido Plaza (born March 13, 1958) is a Filipino politician. A member of the Nationalist People's Coalition, he has been elected to three terms as a Member of the House of Representatives, representing the Lone District of Agusan del Sur, first in 2001 and most recently in 2007.

Plaza was alleged to have used his pork barrel nine times in the pork barrel scam, according to affidavits submitted to the National Bureau of Investigation in July 2013.

== Personal life ==
He is the son of former governors Democrito Plaza and Valentina G. Plaza and brother of former governor Adolph Edward Plaza and governor Maria Valentina Plaza.

== Notes ==
House of Representatives of the Philippines
| Preceded by Alex Bascug | Representative, Lone District of Agusan del Sur; 2001–2010 | Succeeded by Maria Valentina G. Plaza-Cornelio (1st District) and Evelyn "Bebs" P. Mellana (2nd District) |
