= Santiago Cane Jr. =

Filipino politician

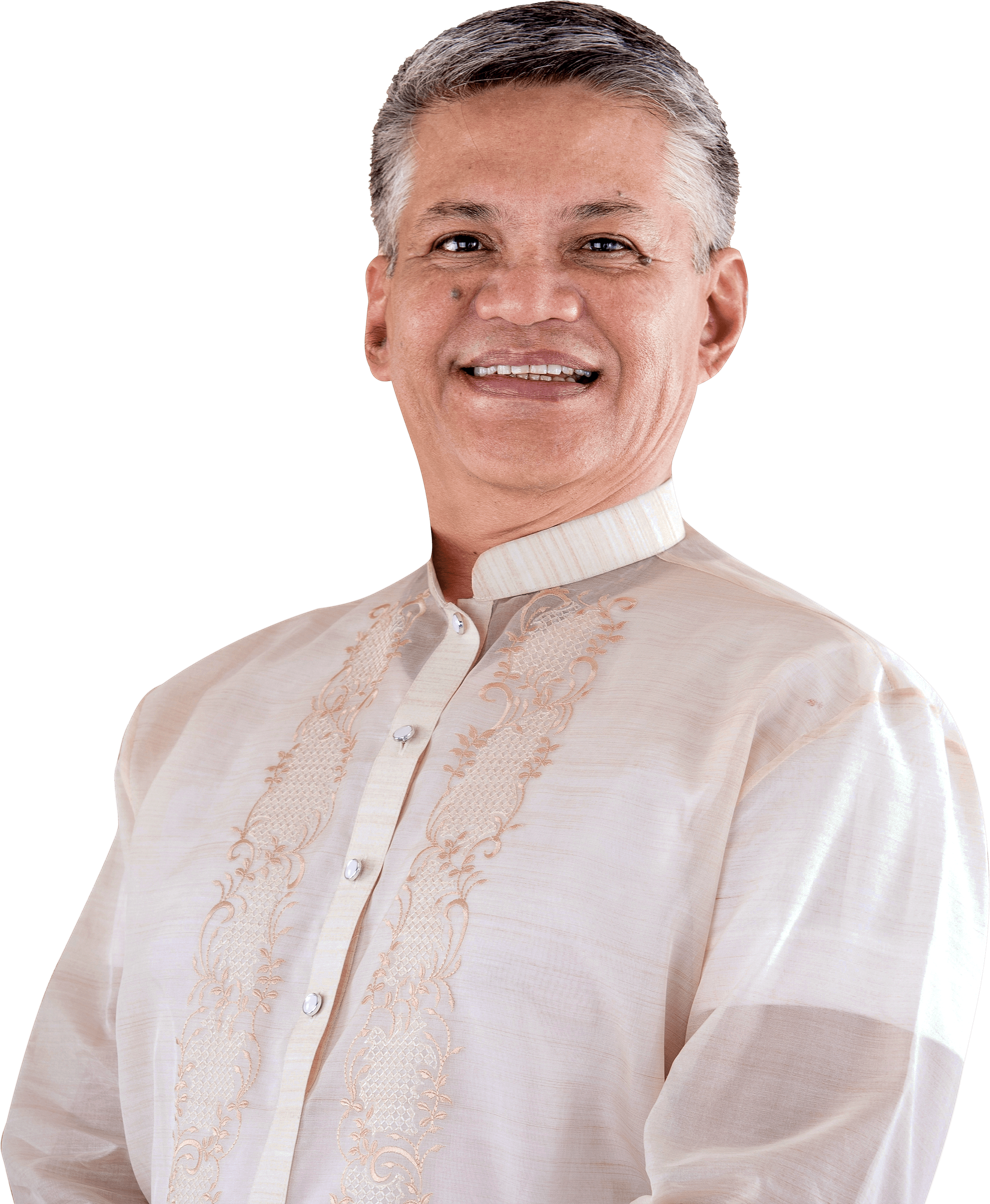
- Official portrait, 2019

9th Governor of Agusan del Sur
- Incumbent
- Assumed office June 30, 2019
- Vice Governor: Samuel Tortor (2019–2025); Patricia Anne Plaza (2025—present)
- Preceded by: Adolph Edward Plaza

Vice Governor of Agusan del Sur
- In office June 30, 2007 – June 30, 2016
- Governor: Maria Valentina Plaza (2007–2010); Adolph Edward Plaza (2010–2016)
- Preceded by: Virginia Getes
- Succeeded by: Samuel Tortor

Personal details
- Born: February 2, 1958 (age 68) Nasipit, Agusan, Philippines
- Party: National Unity Party
- Spouse: Hemlata Daryanani Cane
- Education: Father Saturnino Urios University (BS)

Santiago "Santi" Barriga Cane Jr. (born February 2, 1958) is a Filipino politician who is the governor of the province of Agusan del Sur since 2019. He was the Vice Governor of the province from 2007 to 2016.
