= Prosperidad =

Capital of Agusan del Sur, Philippines

- Municipality
- Municipality of Prosperidad
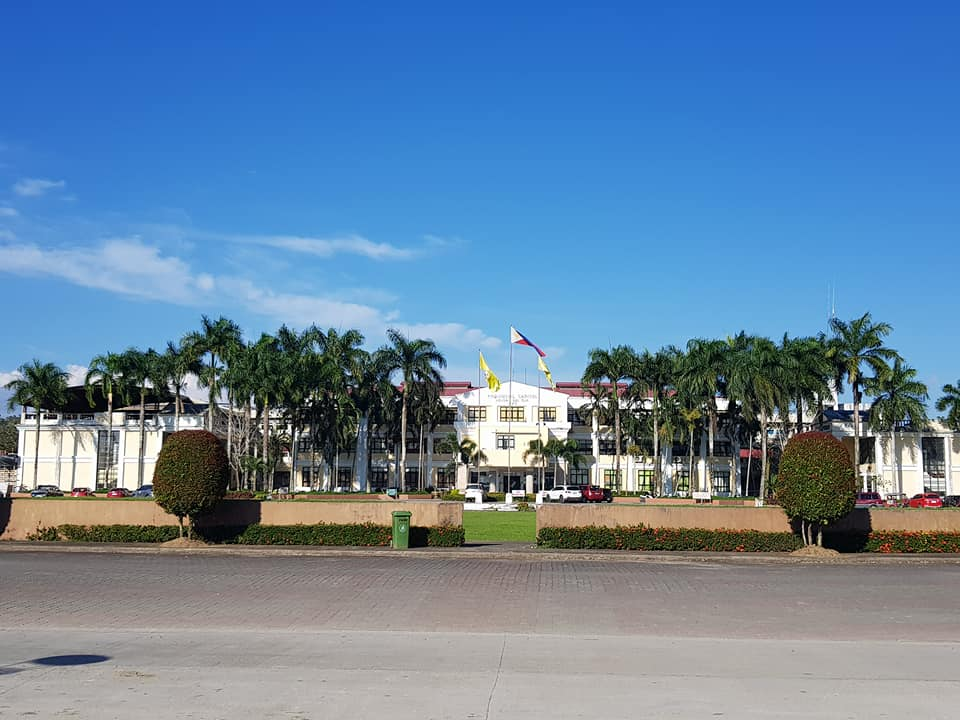
- Provincial Capitol in Prosperidad

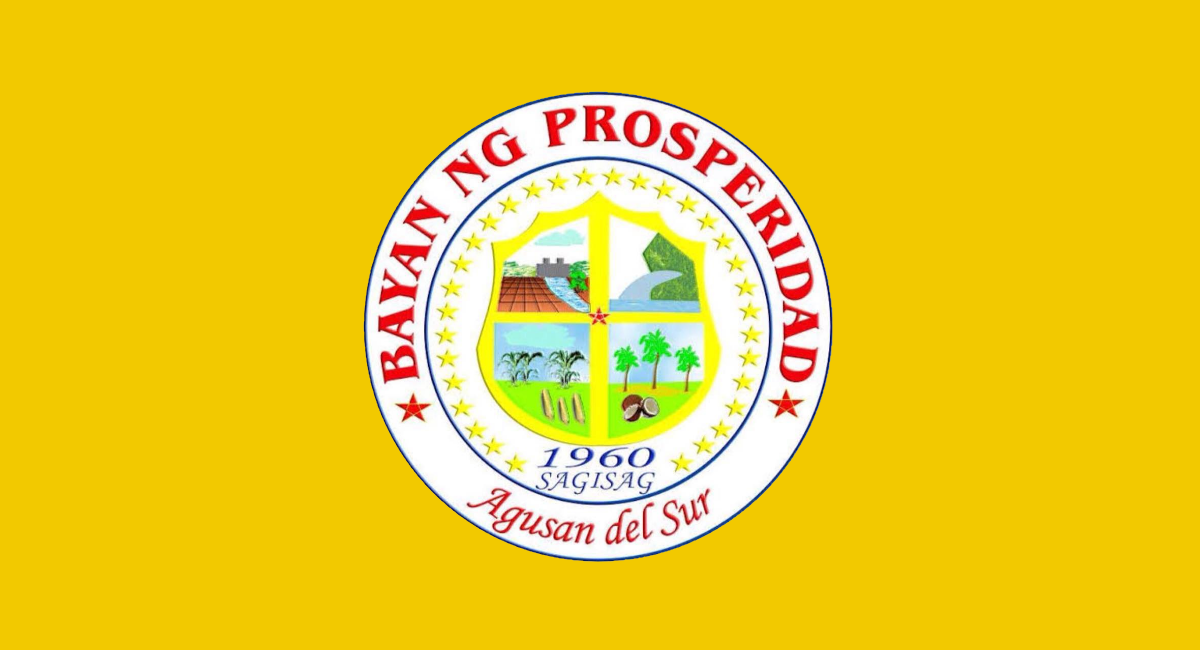
- Flag Seal

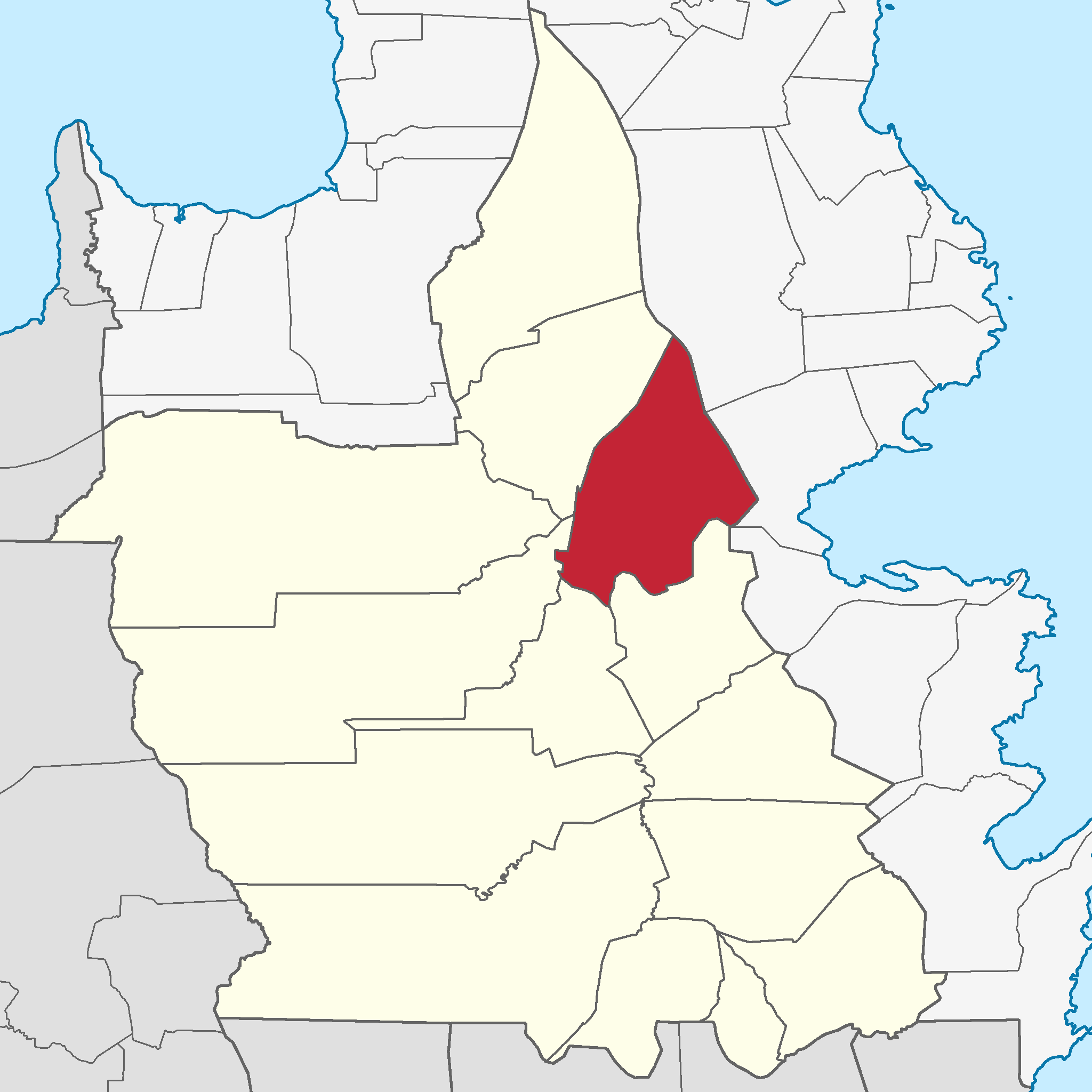
- Map of Agusan del Sur with Prosperidad highlighted
- Interactive map of Prosperidad
- Location within the Philippines
- Coordinates: 8°37′N 125°55′E
- Country: Philippines
- Region: Caraga
- Province: Agusan del Sur
- District: 1st district
- Founded: June 18, 1960
- Barangays: 32 (see Barangays)

Government
  - Type: Sangguniang Bayan
  - Mayor: Frederick Mark P. Mellana
  - Vice Mayor: Jesusimo L. Ronquillo
  - Representative: Alfelito M. Bascug
  - Municipal Council: Members: Cesar M. Romero Jr.; Gina A. Ceballos; Rixon P. Balad-on; Emidita A. Jagonia; Samson L. Auxtero; Alicia S. Demecillo; Nestor L. Corvera; Vicente V. Macadine Jr.
  - Electorate: 49,236 voters (2025)

Area
  - Total: 505.15 km^{2} (195.04 sq mi)
- Elevation: 277 m (909 ft)
- Highest elevation: 1,290 m (4,230 ft)
- Lowest elevation: 0 m (0 ft)

Population (2024 census)
  - Total: 90,162
  - Density: 178.49/km^{2} (462.28/sq mi)
  - Households: 20,869
- Demonym: Próspero(-a)

Economy
  - Income class: 1st municipal income class
  - Poverty incidence: 28.98% (2023)
  - Revenue: ₱ 486.6 million (2024)
  - Assets: ₱ 1,433 million (2024)
  - Expenditure: ₱ 402 million (2024)
  - Liabilities: ₱ 541.9 million (2024)

Service provider
  - Electricity: Agusan del Sur Electric Cooperative (ASELCO)
- Time zone: UTC+8 (PST)
- ZIP code: 8500
- PSGC: 1600306000
- IDD : area code: +63 (0)85
- Native languages: Agusan; Butuanon; Cebuano; Higaonon; Tagalog
- Catholic diocese: Roman Catholic Diocese of Prosperidad
- Named after: Prosperity
- Website: www.prosperidad.gov.ph

Prosperidad, officially the Municipality of Prosperidad (Cebuano: Lungsod sa Prosperidad; Tagalog: Bayan ng Prosperidad), is a municipality and capital of the province of Agusan del Sur, Philippines. According to the 2024 census, it has a population of 90,162 people.

Prosperidad was created on June 18, 1960, through Republic Act No. 2650.

Prosperidad is the venue of the Naliyagan Festival, an annual event celebrated by the entire province of Agusan del Sur. It also hosts its own festival called the Angot Festival celebrated every 28 September in honor of St. Michael the Archangel.

== History ==
Prior to the Spanish Colonial Period, a Manobo settlement thrived at the junction of the Sianib and Gibong River. This settlement was known to the natives as Culilay.

During the Spanish Colonial Period, the missionaries discovered the settlement and soon began the Christianization of the Manobos. The natives were given Christian names and the settlement was renamed from Culilay to Las Navas", as the site was full of bancas, being the means of transportation at the time.

At the start of the American Period, Las Navas was bustling with local trades, but experiencing constant flooding, thus a new community, a business center cops up on a nearby site and was named 'Prosperidad' derived from the word Prospero or "progressive" as the place experienced growth and prosperity during the time of American Governor Zapanta.

== Geography ==
According to the Philippine Statistics Authority, the municipality has a land area of 505.15 square kilometres (195.04 sq mi) constituting 5.06% of the 9,989.52-square-kilometre (3,856.98 sq mi) total area of Agusan del Sur.

=== Climate ===
Climate data for Prosperidad, Agusan del Sur
Month	Jan	Feb	Mar	Apr	May	Jun	Jul	Aug	Sep	Oct	Nov	Dec	Year
Mean daily maximum °C (°F)	27 (81)	27 (81)	28 (82)	29 (84)	29 (84)	29 (84)	29 (84)	30 (86)	30 (86)	29 (84)	28 (82)	28 (82)	29 (83)
Mean daily minimum °C (°F)	22 (72)	22 (72)	22 (72)	23 (73)	23 (73)	23 (73)	23 (73)	23 (73)	23 (73)	23 (73)	23 (73)	23 (73)	23 (73)
Average precipitation mm (inches)	152 (6.0)	116 (4.6)	90 (3.5)	68 (2.7)	88 (3.5)	96 (3.8)	78 (3.1)	73 (2.9)	70 (2.8)	96 (3.8)	125 (4.9)	132 (5.2)	1,184 (46.8)
Average rainy days	20.8	17.7	18.5	17.2	20.8	22.5	22.5	22.7	22.0	23.7	22.5	19.9	250.8
Source: Meteoblue

=== Barangays ===
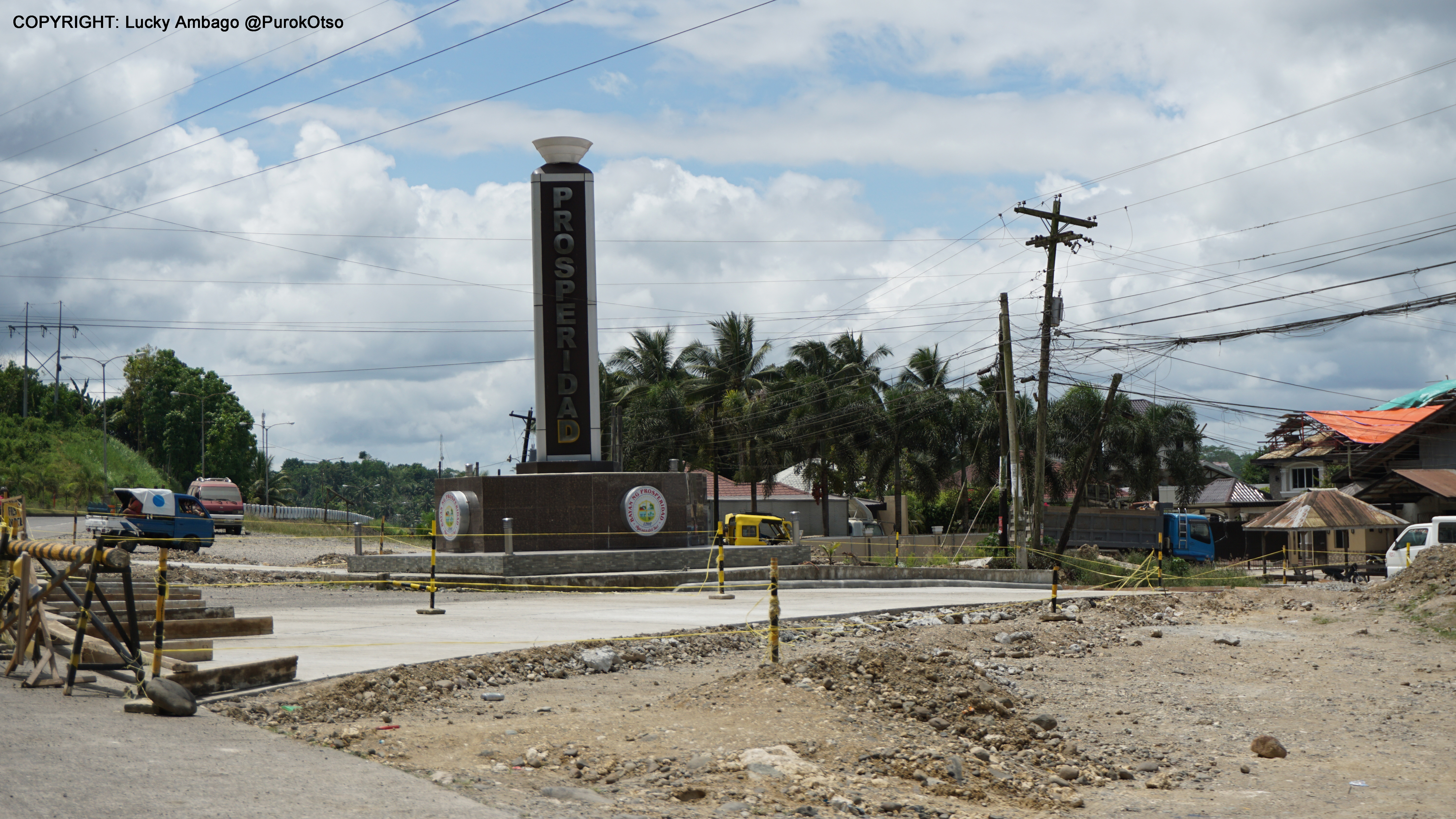
Barangay Poblacion (Bahbah)

Prosperidad is politically subdivided into 32 barangays. Each barangay consists of puroks while some have sitios.

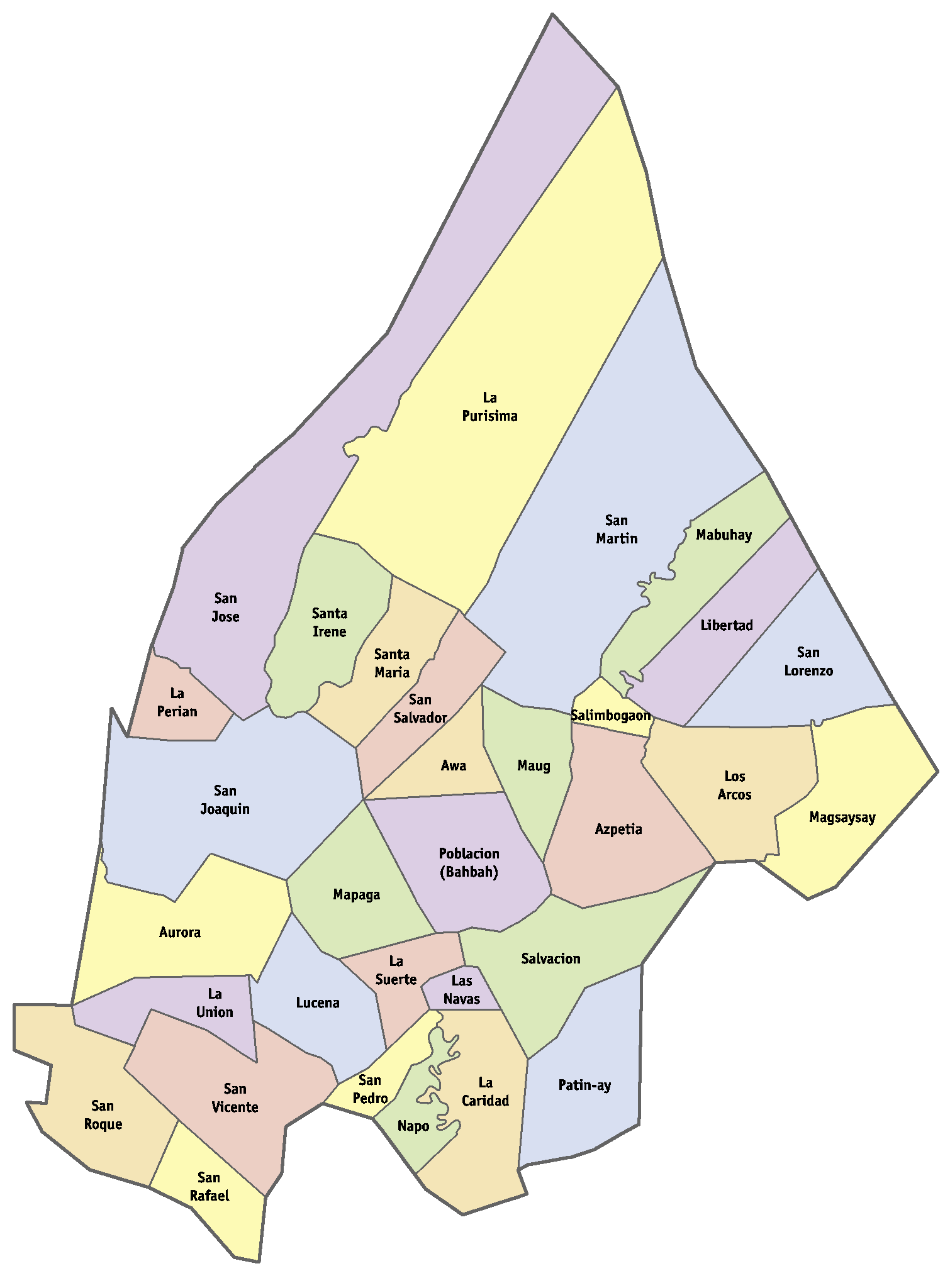
Political map of Prosperidad

PSGC	Barangay	Population			±% p.a.	
		2024		2010		
160306001	Aurora	3.6%	3,251	2,999	▴	0.56%
160306002	Awa	2.1%	1,888	1,802	▴	0.32%
160306003	Azpetia	2.1%	1,850	1,708	▴	0.55%
160306006	La Caridad	2.0%	1,769	1,591	▴	0.74%
160306033	La Perian	0.9%	835	762	▴	0.64%
160306034	La Purisima	2.5%	2,276	2,224	▴	0.16%
160306007	La Suerte	2.0%	1,772	1,490	▴	1.21%
160306008	La Union	2.1%	1,853	1,509	▴	1.43%
160306009	Las Navas	2.0%	1,785	1,535	▴	1.05%
160306010	Libertad	1.1%	985	816	▴	1.31%
160306011	Los Arcos	2.9%	2,606	2,324	▴	0.80%
160306012	Lucena	3.9%	3,511	3,400	▴	0.22%
160306013	Mabuhay	2.2%	2,013	1,938	▴	0.26%
160306014	Magsaysay	2.6%	2,339	1,944	▴	1.29%
160306015	Mapaga	1.7%	1,558	1,394	▴	0.77%
160306017	Napo	1.1%	953	984	▾	−0.22%
160306016	New Maug	1.6%	1,480	1,460	▴	0.09%
160306018	Patin-ay	9.4%	8,505	7,562	▴	0.82%
160306004	Poblacion (Bahbah)	14.1%	12,731	12,180	▴	0.31%
160306020	Salimbogaon	0.9%	790	790	Steady	0.00%
160306021	Salvacion	2.9%	2,659	2,315	▴	0.96%
160306022	San Joaquin	1.9%	1,720	1,484	▴	1.03%
160306023	San Jose	2.9%	2,579	2,436	▴	0.40%
160306024	San Lorenzo	1.5%	1,310	1,483	▾	−0.86%
160306025	San Martin	2.6%	2,379	1,929	▴	1.46%
160306026	San Pedro	0.9%	851	1,395	▾	−3.37%
160306027	San Rafael	2.2%	1,973	1,918	▴	0.20%
160306035	San Roque	1.2%	1,093	719	▴	2.94%
160306029	San Salvador	1.7%	1,567	1,522	▴	0.20%
160306030	San Vicente	4.1%	3,728	3,444	▴	0.55%
160306031	Santa Irene	6.8%	6,148	5,899	▴	0.29%
160306032	Santa Maria	2.1%	1,874	1,672	▴	0.79%
	Total		90,162	76,628	▴	1.13%

== Demographics ==
Population census of Prosperidad
Year	Pop.	±% p.a.
1918	2,212	—
1939	4,180	+3.08%
1948	4,417	+0.61%
1960	12,438	+9.01%
1970	23,328	+6.48%
1975	26,557	+2.63%
1980	33,824	+4.95%
1990	51,189	+4.23%
1995	61,804	+3.59%
2000	70,815	+2.96%
2007	75,390	+0.87%
2010	76,628	+0.59%
2015	82,631	+1.45%
2020	88,321	+1.41%
2024	90,162	+0.50%
Source: Philippine Statistics Authority

In the 2024 census, Prosperidad had a population of 90,162. The population density was 180 inhabitants per square kilometre (470/sq mi).

== Economy ==
Poverty incidence of Prosperidad (%)

Source: Philippine Statistics Authority

== Infrastructure ==
Datu Lipus Makapandong - Gov. D.O. Plaza Sports Complex

=== Sports and recreation ===
The Patin-ay Sports Complex (Officially known as Datu Lipus Makapandong - Gov. D.O. Plaza Sports Complex) was constructed from 2018 to 2021. It cost ₱700 million and has an artificial turf with a rubberized track oval, a covered court, and an Olympic-size swimming pool. The main stadium of the complex has a capacity of 3,000, the aquatic center 1,500, and the basketball court 600. The sports complex is the host for the Palarong Pambansa in 2026. It was opened on June 11, 2023, for the Naliyagan Festival events.

In addition to the above venues, the local government allocated additional ₱1 billion to construct a new EOC Evacuation Center with the capacity of 2,000 people, a second grandstand of the existing track oval with additional capacity for 2,000 more people, a touchpad for the existing Olympic-size Swimming pool, multi-purpose covered courts, a rhythmic gymnastics-exclusive gym, and a renovated commissary building with modern kitchen facilities and function halls.

== Education ==
A satellite campus of the Philippine Normal University is located in Poblacion (popularly known as Bahbah) which was established in 1968.
