= Governor of Agusan del Sur =

Local chief executive

- Gobernador ng Agusan del Sur (Filipino)
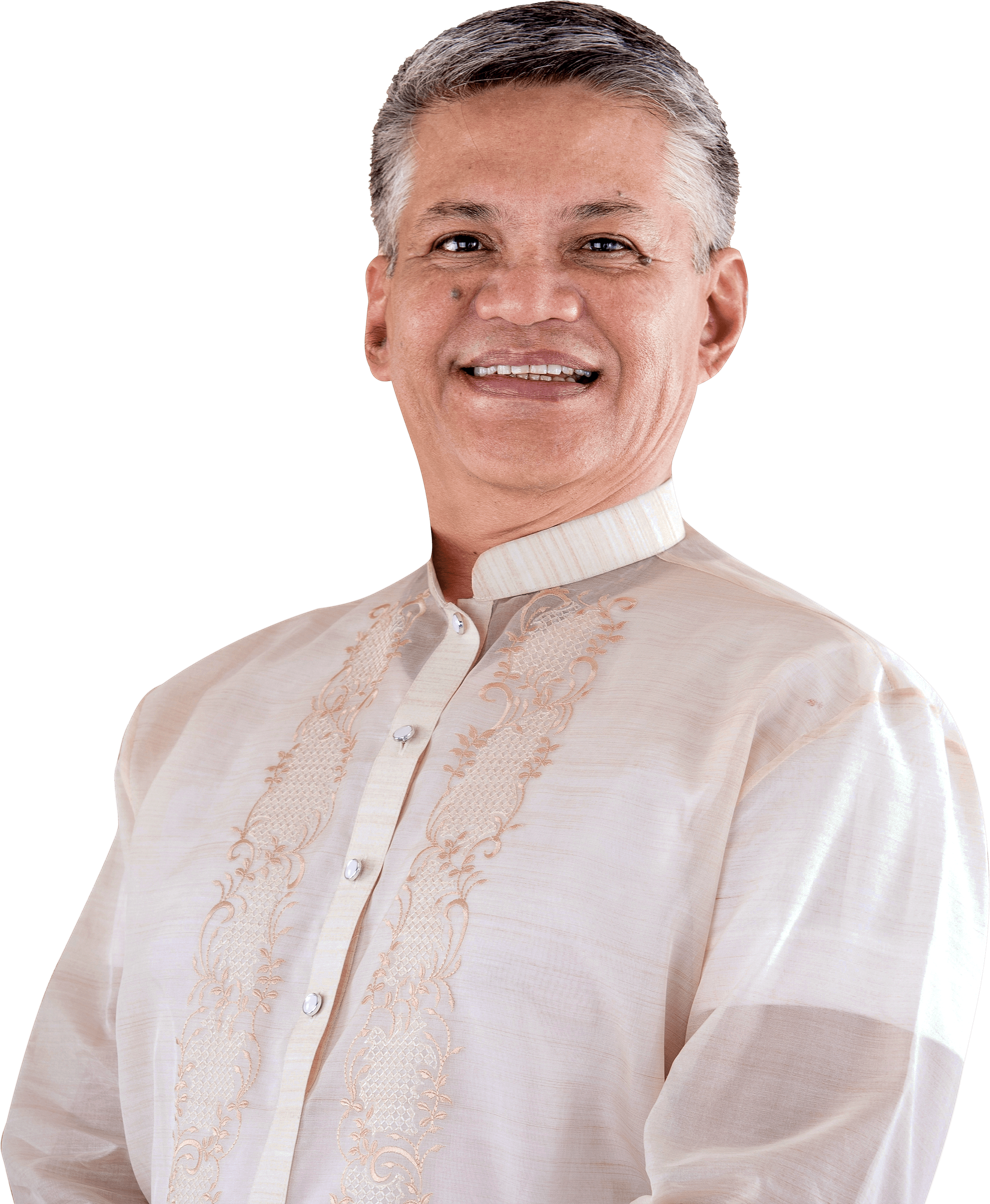
- Incumbent; Santiago Cane Jr. since June 30, 2019
- Style: Honorable (formal)
- Seat: Agusan Del Sur Provincial Capitol
- Term length: 3 years
- Inaugural holder: Rufino Otero
- Formation: June 17, 1967

The governor of Agusan del Sur is the local chief executive of the Philippine province of Agusan del Sur. The position was established following the division of Agusan into the provinces of Agusan del Norte and Agusan del Sur in 1967, with its first governor elected during the 1969 elections.

== List ==
No.	Image	Term	Name	Remarks
1		December 30, 1969–March 26, 1986	Rufino C. Otero	
2		March 26, 1986–June 30, 1992	Ceferino S. Paredes Jr.	Initially appointed OIC governor by President Corazon Aquino and was later elected in his own right
3		June 30, 1992–September 3, 1995	Democrito Plaza	Died in office during his second term
4		September 3, 1995–June 30, 1998	Alex Bascug	Previously Vice Governor, served out the remaining tenure of Governor Plaza
5		June 30, 1998–June 30, 2001	Valentina G. Plaza	
6		June 30, 2001–June 30, 2007	Adolph Edward G. Plaza	
7		June 30, 2007–June 30, 2010	Maria Valentina G. Plaza	
8		June 30, 2010–June 30, 2019	Adolph Edward G. Plaza	
9		June 30, 2019–present	Santiago B. Cane Jr.	
