= Eddiebong Plaza =

Filipino politician

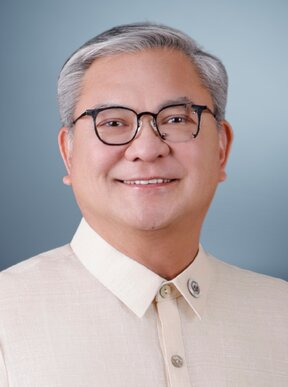
- Official portrait, 2025

Member of the Philippine House of Representatives from Agusan del Sur's 2nd District
- Incumbent
- Assumed office June 30, 2019
- Preceded by: Evelyn Plaza-Mellana

6th and 8th Governor of Agusan del Sur
- In office June 30, 2010 – June 30, 2019
- Vice Governor: Santiago Cane Jr. (2010–2016); Samuel Tortor (2016–2019)
- Preceded by: Maria Valentina Plaza
- Succeeded by: Santiago Cane Jr.
- In office June 30, 2001 – June 30, 2007
- Vice Governor: Virginia Getes
- Preceded by: Valentina Plaza
- Succeeded by: Maria Valentina Plaza

Personal details
- Born: Adolph Edward Galido Plaza; August 21, 1962 (age 64) Manila, Philippines
- Party: NUP (2011–present)
- Other political affiliations: Lakas-CMD (2004–2011); LDP (2001–2004)
- Spouse: Maribel Mijares
- Children: 1
- Education: Cebu Institute of Technology - University (BS)
- Profession: Industrial engineer, politician

Adolph Edward "Eddiebong" Galido Plaza (born August 21, 1962) is a Filipino industrial engineer and politician. He currently serves as a member of the Philippine House of Representatives representing the 2nd District of Agusan del Sur.

== Political career ==
=== House of Representatives (2019–present) ===
House of Representatives of the Philippines
| Preceded by Evelyn Plaza-Mellana | Representative, 2nd District of Agusan del Sur; 2025–present | Incumbent |
Political offices
| Preceded by Maria Valentina Plaza | Governor of Agusan del Sur; 2010–2019; 2001–2007 | Succeeded by Santiago Cane Jr. |
| Preceded by Valentina Plaza | Governor of Agusan del Sur; 2010–2019; 2001–2007 | Succeeded by Maria Valentina Plaza |
