= List of Philippine place names of Spanish origin =

As a result of more than three centuries of Spanish dominance in the islands that are now the republic of the Philippines, an overwhelming number of places in the country have Spanish or Hispanic names. As with Filipino surnames and many other aspects of Filipino culture, place names in the Philippines have received a great deal of Spanish influence, with many places in the former Spanish colony having been named after those in Spain and Latin America. The name Philippines itself originated from its old official name Filipinas in honor of King Philip II of Spain. Spanish language has also become one of the country's official languages from the late 16th century until 1986 when it was designated as a voluntary language and it remains so to this day.

== Provinces ==
- Abra (Spanish for "opening." Originally called El Abra de Vigan -- "The Opening of Vigan")
- Aurora (Spanish given name. Named in honor of Philippine First Lady Aurora Quezon)
- Camarines Norte and Camarines Sur (Camarines is the plural form of the Spanish word camarín which means "boat sheds". Norte pertains to the former province's geographical location being on the north, and Sur pertains to the latter province's geographical location being on the south.)
- Isabela (Spanish given name. Named after Isabella II, the reigning queen of Spain at the time of the province's creation in 1856.)
- La Union (Spanish for "the union," referring to the merging of towns from southern Ilocos Sur and northern Pangasinan that resulted in the creation of the province in 1854.)
- Laguna (Spanish for "lake," or "lagoon," referring to the large body of freshwater (Laguna de Bay, Spanish for "Lake of Bay") that was named after the province's first capital, the town of Bay.)
- Negros Occidental and Negros Oriental (Negros is Spanish for "blacks," referring to the dark-skinned Negritos that inhabited the island. Occidental refers to the former province's geographic location on the island's western half, and Oriental refers to the latter province's geographic location on the island's eastern half. The political division of the island was by a royal decree issued by the King of Spain and executed by the Governor General on January 1, 1890.)
- Nueva Ecija (Spanish for "new Écija", after a town in province of Sevilla, whose topography Don Fausto Cruzat y Góngora associated to.)
- Nueva Vizcaya (Spanish for "new Biscay", after the province in the Basque Country of Spain.)
- Quezon (Spanish surname. The province, formerly known as Tayabas, was renamed in 1949 in honor of Philippine president Manuel Quezon.)
- Quirino (Spanish surname. Named after Philippine president Elpidio Quirino.)
- Rizal (Spanish surname. Named after Philippine national hero José Rizal.)

== Cities ==
- Alaminos, Pangasinan (Spanish surname. Named after the Spanish Governor-General of the Philippines, Juan Alaminos y Vivar.)
- Angeles, Pampanga (contraction of its original Spanish name El Pueblo de los Angeles which means "The Town of Angels.")
- Cadiz, Negros Occidental (named after the Spanish city of Cádiz.)
- Cagayan de Oro, Misamis Oriental ("Golden Cagayan")
- Calaca, Batangas ("skull")
- Carmona, Cavite (named after the town of Carmona in Seville, Spain.)
- Dasmariñas, Cavite (Spanish surname. Named after the Spanish Governor-General of the Philippines, Gómez Pérez Dasmariñas.)
- El Salvador, Misamis Oriental (Spanish for "The Saviour", named after Jesus Christ.)
- Escalante, Negros Occidental (named after the municipality of Escalante in Cantabria, Spain.)
- General Santos (Spanish name. Named after Filipino general Paulino Santos.)
- General Trias, Cavite (Spanish name. Named after Filipino patriot Mariano Trías.)
- Isabela, Basilan (Spanish given name. Named after Queen Isabella II of Spain.)
- La Carlota, Negros Occidental (named after the municipality of La Carlota.)
- Las Piñas (Spanish for "The Pineapples")
- Legazpi, Albay (Spanish surname. Named after the first Spanish Governor-General of the Philippines, Miguel López de Legazpi.)
- Lucena, Quezon (named after the Spanish municipality of Lucena.)
- Marikina (Spanish surname. Named after Spanish Governor-General Félix Berenguer de Marquina.)
- Muñoz, Nueva Ecija (Spanish surname. Named after Francisco Muñoz, Spanish politician and former gobernadorcillo.)
- Oroquieta, Misamis Occidental (named after the barrio of Oroquieta in the district of Villaverde in Madrid, Spain.)
- Ozamiz, Misamis Occidental (Spanish surname. Named after José Ozámiz, a Filipino politician.)
- Puerto Princesa, Palawan (contraction of its original Spanish name Puerto de la Princesa which means "Port of the Princess" named after Princess Eulalia of Spain.)
- Quezon City (Spanish surname. Named after Manuel Luis Quezon, the second president of the Philippines at the time of city's creation in 1939.)
- Roxas, Capiz (Spanish surname. Named after Manuel Acuña Roxas, the fifth president of the Philippines.)
- San Carlos, Negros Occidental ("Saint Charles Borromeo")
- San Carlos, Pangasinan ("Saint Charles Borromeo")
- San Fernando, La Union ("Saint Ferdinand", King of Spain.)
- San Fernando, Pampanga ("Saint Ferdinand", King of Spain.)
- San Jose, Nueva Ecija ("Saint Joseph")
- San Jose del Monte, Bulacan ("Saint Joseph of the Mountain")
- San Juan, Metro Manila ("Saint John the Baptist")
- San Pablo, Laguna ("Saint Paul the First Hermit")
- San Pedro, Laguna ("Saint Peter the Apostle")
- Santa Rosa, Laguna ("Saint Rose of Lima")
- Santiago, Isabela ("Saint James the Apostle")
- Santo Tomas, Batangas ("Saint Thomas Aquinas")
- Toledo, Cebu (named after the Spanish city of Toledo.)
- Trece Martires, Cavite (Spanish for "thirteen martyrs.")
- Urdaneta, Pangasinan (Spanish surname. Named after Andrés de Urdaneta, Spanish friar, circumnavigator and explorer.)
- Valencia, Bukidnon (named after the Spanish city of Valencia.)
- Valenzuela, Metro Manila (Spanish surname. Named after Pío Valenzuela, a Filipino patriot.)
- Victorias, Negros Occidental (from Nuestra Señora de las Victorias, Spanish for "Our Lady of Victories".)

== Municipalities ==
=== A ===
- Abra de Ilog, Mindoro Occidental ("river opening of Ilog")
- Agoncillo, Batangas (Spanish surname. Named after Filipino patriot Felipe Agoncillo.)
- Aguilar, Pangasinan (Spanish surname. Named after Spanish Governor-General Rafael María de Aguilar y Ponce de León.)
- Aguinaldo, Ifugao (Spanish surname. Named after Filipino president Emilio Aguinaldo.)
- Alaminos, Laguna (Spanish surname. Named after Spanish governor general Juan Alaminos y Vivar.)
- Albuera, Leyte (named after the village of La Albuera in Badajoz, Spain.)
- Alburquerque, Bohol (named after the town of Alburquerque in Badajoz, Spain.)
- Alcala, Cagayan (Spanish surname. Named after Spanish Governor-General Francisco de Paula Alcalá de la Torre.)
- Alcala, Pangasinan (named after the city of Alcalá de Henares in Spain.)
- Alcantara, Cebu (named after the town of Alcántara in Caceres, Spain.)
- Alcantara, Romblon (Spanish surname. Named after Filipino politician Ciriaco Alcantara.)
- Alcoy, Cebu (named after the town of Alcoy in Alicante, Spain.)
- Alegria, Cebu ("happiness" / named after the town of Alegría in the Basque Country, Spain.)
- Alegria, Surigao del Norte ("happiness")
- Alfonso, Cavite (Spanish given name. Named after King Alfonso XII of Spain.)
- Alfonso Castañeda, Nueva Vizcaya (Spanish name. Named after a Filipino politician.)
- Alfonso Lista, Ifugao (Spanish name. Named after a Filipino politician.)
- Aliaga, Nueva Ecija (named after the town of Aliaga in Aragon, Spain.)
- Alicia, Bohol (Spanish given name. Named after Filipino First Lady Alicia Syquia Quirino.)
- Alicia, Isabela
- Alicia, Zamboanga Sibugay
- Almagro, Samar (named after the city of Almagro in Castile-La Mancha, Spain.)
- Almeria, Biliran (named after the city of Almería in Andalusia, Spain.)
- Altavas, Aklan (Spanish surname. Named after Filipino senator Jose Altavas.)
- Amadeo, Cavite (Spanish given name. Named after King Amadeo I of Spain)
- Anda, Bohol (Spanish surname. Named after Spanish Governor-General Simón de Anda y Salazar.)
- Anda, Pangasinan
- Antequera, Bohol (named after the city of Antequera in Malaga, Spain.)
- Araceli, Palawan (derived from Nuestra Señora de Araceli, Spanish name for "Our Lady of the Altar of the Sky".)
- Arteche, Eastern Samar (Spanish surname. Named after Filipino politician Pedro Arteche.)
- Asturias, Cebu (named after the principality of Asturias, Spain.)
- Asuncion, Davao del Norte (derived from Nuestra Señora de la Asunción, Spanish name for "Our Lady of the Assumption")
- Aurora, Isabela (Spanish given name which means "dawn". Named after Filipino First Lady Aurora Quezon.)
- Aurora, Zamboanga del Sur

=== B ===
- Ballesteros, Cagayan (Spanish surname. Named after Filipino priest Gregorio Ballesteros.)
- Barbaza, Antique (Spanish surname. Named after Spanish governor Enrique Barbaza.)
- Barcelona, Sorsogon (named after the Spanish city of Barcelona.)
- Barotac Nuevo, Iloilo ("New Barotac")
- Barotac Viejo, Iloilo ("Old Barotac")
- Basco, Batanes (Spanish surname. Named after Spanish Governor-General José Basco y Vargas.)
- Basilisa, Dinagat Islands (Spanish given name.)
- Basista, Pangasinan (Spanish surname of unknown origin.)
- Bautista, Pangasinan (derived from San Juan Bautista, Spanish name for "Saint John the Baptist")
- Benito Soliven, Isabela (Spanish name. Named after Filipino politician Benito T. Soliven.)
- Bien Unido, Bohol ("well united")
- Bilar, Bohol (named after the municipality of Elvillar in the Basque Country, Spain.)
- Bonifacio, Misamis Occidental (Spanish surname. Named after Filipino patriot Andres Bonifacio.)
- Borbon, Cebu (named after Spain's King Philip V of Borbon)
- Braulio E. Dujali, Davao del Norte (Spanish name. Named after a Filipino pioneer.)
- Buenavista, Agusan del Norte ("good view")
- Buenavista, Bohol
- Buenavista, Guimaras
- Buenavista, Marinduque
- Buenavista, Quezon
- Bugallon, Pangasinan (Spanish surname. Named after Filipino revolutionary José Torres Bugallón)
- Burdeos, Quezon (named after the French city of Bordeaux by a Spanish friar, which in Spanish is "Burdeos")
- Burgos, Ilocos Norte (named after the Spanish city of Burgos, Castille)
- Burgos, Ilocos Sur
- Burgos, Isabela
- Burgos, La Union
- Burgos, Pangasinan
- Burgos, Surigao del Norte
- Bustos, Bulacan ("tombs")

=== C ===
- Cagayancillo, Palawan ("Little Cagayan")
- Calatrava, Negros Occidental (named after the town of Calatrava la Vieja in Castile-La Mancha, Spain.)
- Calatrava, Romblon
- Candelaria, Quezon (derived from Nuestra Señora de la Candelaria, Spanish name for "Our Lady of Candlemas")
- Candelaria, Zambales
- Cardona, Rizal (named after the town of Cardona in Catalonia, Spain.)
- Carles, Iloilo (Spanish/Catalan surname. Named after Spanish governor Jose Maria Carles.)
- Carmen, Agusan del Norte (derived from Nuestra Señora de Monte Carmelo commonly referred to as Virgen del Carmen, Spanish for "Our Lady of Mount Carmel.")
- Carmen, Bohol
- Carmen, Cebu
- Carmen, Cotabato
- Carmen, Davao del Norte
- Carmen, Surigao del Sur
- Carrascal, Surigao del Sur ("oak plantation"/named after Carrascal del Río, a Spanish town.)
- Castilla, Sorsogon (named after the Kingdom of Castile (Spain) )
- Castillejos, Zambales (Spanish surname. Named after Spanish General Juan Primo y Prata Marques de los Castillejos.)
- Cervantes, Ilocos Sur (named after the town in Galicia, Spain where novelist Miguel de Cervantes was born.)
- Clarin, Bohol (Spanish surname. Named after Filipino senator Aniceto Clarin.)
- Clarin, Misamis Occidental
- Claver, Surigao del Norte (shortened version of the original name San Pedro Claver, Spanish for "Saint Peter Claver", the municipality's patron saint.)
- Claveria, Cagayan (Spanish surname. Named after Spanish Governor-General Narciso Clavería y Zaldúa.)
- Claveria, Masbate
- Claveria, Misamis Oriental
- Compostela, Cebu (named after the town of Santiago de Compostela in Galicia, Spain.)
- Compostela, Davao de Oro
- Concepcion, Iloilo (derived from La Inmaculada Concepcion, Spanish for "Immaculate Conception".)
- Concepcion, Misamis Occidental
- Concepcion, Romblon
- Concepcion, Tarlac
- Consolacion, Cebu (derived from Nuestra Señora de Consolación, Spanish name for "Our Lady of Consolation.")
- Corcuera, Romblon (Spanish surname. Named after Spanish Governor-General Sebastián Hurtado de Corcuera.)
- Cordoba, Cebu (named after the city of Córdoba in Andalusia, Spain.)
- Cordon, Isabela ("cord")
- Corella, Bohol (named after the town of Corella in Navarre, Spain.)
- Cortes, Bohol (Spanish surname. Named after the Spanish conquistador of the Americas Hernán Cortés.)
- Cortes, Surigao del Sur
- Cuartero, Capiz (Spanish surname. Named after Spanish bishop Mariano Cuartero.)
- Cuenca, Batangas ("river basin")

=== D ===
- Del Carmen, Surigao del Norte (contraction of its original name Virgen del Carmen, Spanish for "Virgin of Mount Carmel.")
- Del Gallego, Camarines Sur (Spanish surname. Named after Spanish-Filipino businessman Juan del Gallego.)
- Delfin Albano, Isabela (Spanish name. Named after Filipino politician Delfin B. Albano.)
- Dolores, Abra (derived from Nuestra Señora de los Dolores, Spanish name for "Our Lady of Sorrows")
- Dolores, Eastern Samar
- Dolores, Quezon
- Don Carlos, Bukidnon (Spanish name. Named after Filipino politician Carlos Fortich.)
- Don Marcelino, Davao del Sur (Spanish name. Named after Filipino pioneer Marcelino Maruya.)
- Don Victoriano, Misamis Occidental (Spanish name. Named after Filipino-Chinese politician Victoriano Chiongbian.)
- Donsol, Sorsogon (Spanish name. Named after Don for Mister and Sol for sun.)
- Doña Remedios Trinidad, Bulacan (Spanish name. Named after Remedios T. Romualdez, mother of Filipino First Lady Imelda Marcos)
- Dueñas, Iloilo (named after the town of Dueñas in Palencia, Spain.)
- Duero, Bohol (named after "Rio Duero" in the Iberian peninsula.)
- Dupax del Norte, Nueva Vizcaya ("Dupax of the North")
- Dupax del Sur, Nueva Vizcaya ("Dupax of the South")

=== E ===
- Echague, Isabela (Spanish surname. Named after Spanish Governor-General Rafaél de Echagüe y Bermingham.)
- El Nido, Palawan ("The Bird's Nest")
- Enrile, Cagayan (Spanish surname. Named after Spanish Governor-General Pascual Enrile y Alcedo.)
- Enrique B. Magalona, Negros Occidental (Spanish name. Named after a Filipino politician.)
- Enrique Villanueva, Siquijor (Spanish name. Named after Filipino politician Enrique C. Villanueva.)
- Esperanza, Agusan del Sur ("hope" / from Nuestra Señora de la Esperanza, Spanish for "Our Lady of Hope")
- Esperanza, Masbate
- Esperanza, Sultan Kudarat
- Estancia, Iloilo ("ranch")

=== F ===
- Famy, Laguna (Spanish surname. Named after Filipino president Emilio Aguinaldo y Famy.)
- Ferrol, Romblon (named after the city of Ferrol in Galicia, Spain.)
- Flora, Apayao (Spanish given name. Named after the wife of Filipino congressman Alfredo Lam-en.)
- Floridablanca, Pampanga ("white flower")

=== G ===
- Gabaldon, Nueva Ecija (Spanish surname. Named after Filipino senator Isauro Gabaldon.)
- Gainza, Camarines Sur (Spanish surname. Named after Spanish bishop Francisco Gainza.)
- Gandara, Samar (Spanish surname. Named after Spanish Governor-General José de la Gándara y Navarro.)
- Garchitorena, Camarines Sur (Spanish surname. Named after Spanish-Filipino revolutionary Andres Garchitorena.)
- Garcia Hernandez, Bohol (Spanish surname. Named after two missionaries - (Narciso Hernandez de Jesus y Maria, O.A.R., Spanish Parish Priest of Guindulman and Jose Garcia de la Virgen de los Remedios, O.A.R., Filipino Parish Priest of Loon.)
- General Emilio Aguinaldo, Cavite (Spanish name. Named after Filipino president Emilio Aguinaldo.)
- General Luna, Quezon (Spanish surname. Named after Filipino patriot General Antonio Luna.)
- General Luna, Surigao del Norte
- General Mamerto Natividad, Nueva Ecija (Spanish name. Named after a Filipino revolutionary.)
- General Mariano Alvarez, Cavite (Spanish name. Named after Filipino patriot Mariano Álvarez.)
- General Tinio, Nueva Ecija (Spanish name. Named after Filipino revolutionary General Manuel Tinio.)
- Gerona, Tarlac (named after the city of Girona in Catalonia, Spain.)
- Getafe, Bohol (named after the city of Getafe in Madrid, Spain.)
- Gloria, Oriental Mindoro (Spanish given name. Named after Filipino president Gloria Arroyo.)
- Gonzaga, Cagayan (Spanish surname. Named after Filipino politician Gracio Gonzaga.)
- Governor Generoso, Davao Oriental (Spanish surname. Named after Filipino politician Sebastian Generoso.)
- Gregorio del Pilar, Ilocos Sur (Spanish name. Named after Filipino patriot Gregorio del Pilar.)

=== H ===
- Hermosa, Bataan ("beautiful"/a contraction of its original name Llana Hermosa which means "beautiful plains.")
- Hernani, Eastern Samar (named after the town of Hernani in the Basque Country, Spain.)

=== I ===
- Imelda, Zamboanga Sibugay (Spanish given name. Named after Filipino First Lady Imelda Marcos.)
- Infanta, Pangasinan (named after Princess Infanta Eulalia of Spain.)
- Infanta, Quezon
- Isabel, Leyte (Spanish given name. Named after Queen Isabella II of Spain.)
- Isabela, Negros Occidental (Spanish given name. Named after Queen Isabella II of Spain.)

=== J ===
- Jaen, Nueva Ecija (named after the city of Jaén in Andalusia, Spain.)
- Javier, Leyte (Spanish surname. Named after Filipino teacher and pioneer Daniel Falcon Javier.)
- Jimenez, Misamis Occidental (Spanish surname. Named after Spanish missionary Francisco Jimenez de Fermin.)
- Jose Abad Santos, Davao del Sur (Spanish name. Named after the Chief Justice of the Supreme Court of the Philippines (José Abad Santos.)
- Jose Dalman, Zamboanga del Norte (Spanish name. Named after Filipino patriot Jose Dalman.)
- Josefina, Zamboanga del Sur (Spanish given name. Named after Josefina Edralin, mother of Filipino president Ferdinand Marcos.)
- Jovellar, Albay (Spanish surname. Named after Spanish Governor-General Joaquín Jovellar.)
- Julita, Leyte (Spanish given name. Named after Filipino pioneer Julita Caladcad.)

=== L ===
- La Castellana, Negros Occidental (named after Paseo de la Castellana in Madrid, Spain.)
- La Libertad, Negros Oriental ("the freedom")
- La Libertad, Zamboanga del Norte
- La Paz, Abra (derived from Nuestra Señora da la Paz, Spanish name for "Our Lady of Peace.")
- La Paz, Agusan del Sur
- La Paz, Leyte
- La Paz, Tarlac
- La Trinidad, Benguet ("The Trinity")
- Labrador, Pangasinan (contraction of San Isidro Labrador, Spanish name for "Saint Isidore the Laborer")
- Lanuza, Surigao del Sur (Spanish surname of unknown origin.)
- Larena, Siquijor (Spanish surname. Named after Filipino politician Demetrio Larena.)
- Las Navas, Northern Samar ("the plains")
- Las Nieves, Agusan del Norte ("the snows"; from Nuestra Señora de las Nieves, Spanish for "Our Lady of the Snows.")
- Laurel, Batangas (Spanish surname. Named after Filipino president José P. Laurel.)
- Lavezares, Northern Samar (Spanish surname. Named after Spanish Governor-General Guido de Lavezaris.)
- Lazi, Siquijor (derived from the Spanish surname Lacy. Named after Spanish Governor-General Manuel Pavía y Lacy.)
- Leganes, Iloilo (named after the city of Leganés in Madrid, Spain.)
- Lemery, Batangas (Spanish surname. Named after Spanish Governor-General José Lémery e Ibarrola.)
- Lemery, Iloilo
- Leon, Iloilo (named after the city of León in central Spain.)
- Leon B. Postigo, Zamboanga del Norte (Spanish name. Named after a Filipino general.)
- Lezo, Aklan (named after the town of Lezo in the Basque Country, Spain.)
- Libertad, Antique ("freedom")
- Libertad, Misamis Oriental
- Llanera, Nueva Ecija (Spanish surname. Named after Filipino revolutionary General Mariano Llanera.)
- Llorente, Eastern Samar (Spanish surname. Named after Filipino politician Julio Llorente.)
- Lope de Vega, Northern Samar (named after the Spanish poet Lope de Vega.)
- Lopez, Quezon (Spanish surname. Named after Spanish politician Don Candido Diaz Lopez.)
- Lopez Jaena, Misamis Occidental (Spanish surname. Named Filipino patriot Graciano López Jaena.)
- Loreto, Agusan del Sur (derived from Nuestra Señora de Loreto, Spanish name for "Our Lady of Laurel.")
- Loreto, Surigao del Norte
- Los Baños, Laguna ("The Baths")
- Luisiana, Laguna (Spanish given name. Named after Spanish politician Luis Bernardo.)
- Luna, Apayao (Spanish surname. Named after Filipino painter Juan Luna.)
- Luna, Isabela
- Luna, La Union

=== M ===
- Macrohon, Southern Leyte (Spanish surname. Named after Spanish Governor-General Manuel MacCrohon.)
- Madrid, Surigao del Sur (named after the Spanish capital city of Madrid.)
- Madridejos, Cebu (named after the town of Madridejos in Castile-La Mancha, Spain.)
- Magallanes, Agusan del Norte (named after Portuguese explorer Ferdinand Magellan, in Spanish: Fernando de Magallanes.)
- Magallanes, Cavite
- Magallanes, Sorsogon
- Magdalena, Laguna (Spanish given name derived from Santa Maria Magdalena, Spanish for "Saint Mary Magdalene.")
- Malvar, Batangas (Spanish surname. Named after Filipino patriot General Miguel Malvar.)
- Manolo Fortich, Bukidnon (Spanish name. Named after a Filipino politician.)
- Marcos, Ilocos Norte (Spanish surname. Named after Filipino president Ferdinand Marcos.)
- Maria, Siquijor (Spanish given name; contraction of its original name Santa Maria.)
- Maria Aurora, Aurora (Spanish given name. Named after Filipino presidential daughter Maria Aurora Quezon.)
- Mayorga, Leyte (named after the Spanish island of Mallorca.)
- Medellin, Cebu (named after the village of Medellín in Badajoz, Spain.)
- Mendez, Cavite (Spanish surname. Named after Spanish naval officer Casto Méndez Núñez.)
- Mercedes, Camarines Norte (Spanish given name. Named after Spain's Princess Mercedes of Asturias.)
- Mercedes, Eastern Samar
- Merida, Leyte (named after the city of Mérida in Extremadura, Spain.)
- Mexico, Pampanga (named after Mexico City, then the capital of New Spain in present-day Mexico.)
- Milagros, Masbate ("miracles", derived from Milagros de Nuestra Señora, Spanish for "The Miracles of Our Lady.")
- Mina, Iloilo ("mine")
- Minglanilla, Cebu (named after the town of Minglanilla in Castile-La Mancha, Spain.)
- Moises Padilla, Negros Occidental (Spanish name. Named after a Filipino politician.)
- Molave, Zamboanga del Sur (from Molave, a Philippine timber tree; in Tagalog, "mulawin")
- Moncada, Tarlac (named after the municipality of Moncada in Valencia, Spain.)
- Mondragon, Northern Samar (named after the town of Mondragón in the Basque Country, Spain.)
- Monkayo, Davao de Oro (named after Mount Moncayo in Spain.)
- Monreal, Masbate (Spanish surname. Named after Filipino politician Bernardino G. Monreal.)
- Montevista, Davao de Oro ("mountain view")
- Murcia, Negros Occidental (named after the Spanish city of Murcia.)

=== N ===
- Nabas, Aklan (derived from Spanish surname Navas. Named after Spanish Governor General Cárlos María de la Torre y Nava Cerrada.)
- Natividad, Pangasinan (derived from Natividad de Nuestro Señor Jesucristo, Spanish for "The Nativity of Our Lord Jesus Christ.")
- Naval, Biliran (derived from "La Naval de Manila.")
- New Corella, Davao del Norte (named after the town of Corella in Navarra, Spain.)
- New Lucena, Iloilo (named after the town of Lucena in Andalusia, Spain.)
- Norala, South Cotabato (derived from Norte de Alah, Spanish for "North Alah (Valley).")
- Norzagaray, Bulacan (Spanish surname. Named after Spanish Governor-General Fernándo Norzagaray y Escudero.)
- Nueva Era, Ilocos Norte ("New Era")
- Nueva Valencia, Guimaras ("New Valencia"; named after the Spanish city of Valencia.)
- Numancia, Aklan (named after the town of Numantia in Castile & Leon, Spain.)

=== O ===
- Obando, Bulacan (Spanish surname. Named after Spanish Governor-General Francisco José de Ovando.)
- Ocampo, Camarines Sur (Spanish surname. Named after Filipino politician Julian Ocampo.)

=== P ===
- Padre Burgos, Quezon (Spanish name. Named after Filipino priest and martyr Father José Burgos.)
- Padre Burgos, Southern Leyte
- Padre Garcia, Batangas (Spanish name. Named after Filipino priest and patriot Father Vicente Garcia.)
- Palo, Leyte ("stick")
- Pamplona, Cagayan (named after the city of Pamplona in Navarra, Spain.)
- Pamplona, Camarines Sur
- Pamplona, Negros Oriental
- Pastrana, Leyte (named after the town of Pastrana in Guadalajara, Spain.)
- Pateros ("duck-raisers")
- Pavia, Iloilo (Spanish surname. Named after Spanish Governor-General Manuel Pavía y Lacy.)
- Peñablanca, Cagayan ("white rock")
- Peñaranda, Nueva Ecija (Spanish surname. Named after Spanish engineer José Maria Peñaranda.)
- Peñarrubia, Abra ("red rock")
- Perez, Quezon (Spanish surname. Named after Filipino politician Filemón E. Perez.)
- Pilar, Abra (derived from Nuestra Señora del Pilar, Spanish name for "Our Lady of the Pillar.")
- Pilar, Bataan
- Pilar, Bohol
- Pilar, Capiz
- Pilar, Cebu
- Pilar, Sorsogon
- Pilar, Surigao del Norte
- Pililla, Rizal ("Little Pila")
- Piñan, Zamboanga del Norte (derived from piña, Spanish for "pineapple.")
- Pio V. Corpuz, Masbate (Spanish name. Named after a Filipino politician.)
- Pio Duran, Albay (Spanish name. Named after Filipino politician Pio S. Duran.)
- Placer, Masbate ("sandbank")
- Placer, Surigao del Norte
- Plaridel, Bulacan (Spanish surname. Named after Filipino patriot Marcelo H. Del Pilar, whose pen name was Plaridel.)
- Plaridel, Misamis Occidental
- Plaridel, Quezon
- Polanco, Zamboanga del Norte (Spanish surname. Named after Spanish missionary Father Juan Polanco.)
- Pontevedra, Capiz (named after the city of Pontevedra in Galicia, Spain.)
- Pontevedra, Negros Occidental
- Pozorrubio, Pangasinan ("red well")
- Presentacion, Camarines Sur (Spanish surname. Named after Filipino politician Teodorico Presentacion.)
- President Carlos P. Garcia, Bohol (Spanish name. Named after Filipino President Carlos P. Garcia.)
- President Manuel Roxas, Zamboanga del Norte (Spanish name. Named after Filipino president Manuel Roxas)
- President Quirino, Sultan Kudarat (Spanish surname. Named after Filipino President Elpidio Quirino.)
- President Roxas, Capiz (Spanish surname. Named after Filipino President Manuel Roxas.)
- President Roxas, Cotabato
- Prieto Diaz, Sorsogon (Spanish surnames. Named after Filipino politicians Gabriel Prieto and Severino Díaz.)
- Prosperidad, Agusan del Sur ("prosperity")
- Puerto Galera, Oriental Mindoro ("Port of the Galleys")
- Pura, Tarlac (derived from pura raza ilocana, Spanish for "pure ilocano race" in reference to its early settlers.)

=== Q ===
- Quezon, Bukidnon (Spanish surname. Named after Filipino president Manuel Luis Quezon.)
- Quezon, Isabela
- Quezon, Nueva Ecija
- Quezon, Nueva Vizcaya
- Quezon, Palawan
- Quezon, Quezon
- Quirino, Ilocos Sur (Spanish surname. Named after Filipino president Elpidio Quirino.)
- Quirino, Isabela

=== R ===
- Ramon, Isabela (Spanish given name. Named after Filipino president Ramon Magsaysay.)
- Ramon Magsaysay, Zamboanga del Sur
- Ramos, Tarlac (Spanish surname. Named after Filipino politician Alfonso Ramos.)
- Real, Quezon (contraction of its original name Puerto Real, Spanish for "Royal Port.")
- Reina Mercedes, Isabela ("Queen Mercedes"; Named after Queen Mercedes of Spain.)
- Remedios T. Romualdez, Agusan del Norte (Spanish name. Named after Remedios T. Romualdez, mother of Filipino First Lady Imelda Marcos.)
- Rizal, Cagayan (Spanish surname. Named after Filipino patriot José Rizal.)
- Rizal, Kalinga
- Rizal, Laguna
- Rizal, Nueva Ecija
- Rizal, Occidental Mindoro
- Rizal, Palawan
- Rizal, Zamboanga del Norte
- Rodriguez, Rizal (Spanish surname. Named after Filipino politician Eulogio Rodriguez. Its former name is Montalban, from the town of Montalbán in Aragon, Spain.)
- Ronda, Cebu (named after the city of Ronda in Malaga, Spain.)
- Rosales, Pangasinan (Spanish surname. Named after Spanish member of the Real Audiencia Antonio Rosales.)
- Rosario, Agusan del Sur ("rosary" / from Nuestra Señora del Rosario, Spanish for "Our Lady of the Rosary.")
- Rosario, Batangas
- Rosario, Cavite
- Rosario, La Union
- Rosario, Northern Samar
- Roseller Lim, Zamboanga Sibugay (Spanish name. Named after Filipino-Chinese senator Roseller Lim.)
- Roxas, Isabela (Spanish surname. Named after Filipino president Manuel Roxas.)
- Roxas, Oriental Mindoro
- Roxas, Palawan

=== S ===
- Salcedo, Eastern Samar (Spanish surname. Named after Spanish conquistador Juan de Salcedo.)
- Salcedo, Ilocos Sur
- Salvador, Lanao del Norte (Spanish given name which means "savior." Named after Filipino politician Salvador T. Lluch.)
- Salvador Benedicto, Negros Occidental (Spanish name. Named after a Filipino politician.)
- San Agustin, Isabela ("Saint Augustine of Hippo")
- San Agustin, Romblon
- San Agustin, Surigao del Sur
- San Andres, Catanduanes ("Saint Andrew")
- San Andres, Quezon
- San Andres, Romblon
- San Antonio, Northern Samar ("Saint Anthony of Padua")
- San Antonio, Nueva Ecija
- San Antonio, Quezon
- San Antonio, Zambales
- San Benito, Surigao del Norte (derived from San Benedicto, Spanish for "Saint Benedict". San Benito is a diminutive form of San Benedicto.)
- San Clemente, Tarlac ("Saint Clement")
- San Dionisio, Iloilo ("Saint Dionysius")
- San Emilio, Ilocos Sur ("Saint Emilius")
- San Enrique, Iloilo ("Saint Henry")
- San Enrique, Negros Occidental
- San Esteban, Ilocos Sur ("Saint Stephen")
- San Fabian, Pangasinan ("Saint Fabian")
- San Felipe, Zambales ("Saint Philip")
- San Fernando, Bukidnon ("Saint Ferdinand")
- San Fernando, Camarines Sur
- San Fernando, Cebu
- San Fernando, Masbate
- San Fernando, Romblon
- San Francisco, Agusan del Sur ("Saint Francis of Assisi")
- San Francisco, Cebu
- San Francisco, Quezon
- San Francisco, Southern Leyte
- San Francisco, Surigao del Norte
- San Gabriel, La Union ("Saint Gabriel")
- San Guillermo, Isabela ("Saint William the Great")
- San Ildefonso, Bulacan ("Saint Ildephonsus of Toledo")
- San Ildefonso, Ilocos Sur
- San Isidro, Abra ("Saint Isidore the Laborer")
- San Isidro, Bohol
- San Isidro, Davao Oriental
- San Isidro, Isabela
- San Isidro, Leyte
- San Isidro, Northern Samar
- San Isidro, Nueva Ecija
- San Isidro, Surigao del Norte
- San Jacinto, Masbate ("Saint Hyacinth")
- San Jacinto, Pangasinan
- San Joaquin, Iloilo ("Saint Joachim")
- San Jorge, Samar ("Saint George")
- San Jose, Batangas ("Saint Joseph")
- San Jose, Camarines Sur
- San Jose, Dinagat Islands
- San Jose, Negros Oriental
- San Jose, Northern Samar
- San Jose, Occidental Mindoro
- San Jose, Romblon
- San Jose, Tarlac
- San Jose de Buan, Samar ("Saint Joseph of Buan")
- San Jose de Buenavista, Antique ("Saint Joseph of Buenavista")
- San Juan, Abra ("Saint John the Baptist")
- San Juan, Batangas
- San Juan, Ilocos Sur
- San Juan, La Union
- San Juan, Siquijor
- San Juan, Southern Leyte
- San Julian, Eastern Samar ("Saint Julian of Cuenca")
- San Leonardo, Nueva Ecija ("Saint Leonard of Port Maurice")
- San Lorenzo, Guimaras ("Saint Lawrence")
- San Lorenzo Ruiz, Camarines Norte (Spanish name. Named after the first Filipino saint, Lorenzo Ruiz.)
- San Luis, Agusan del Sur ("Saint Louis of Toulouse")
- San Luis, Aurora
- San Luis, Batangas
- San Luis, Pampanga
- San Manuel, Isabela ("Saint Emmanuel")
- San Manuel, Pangasinan
- San Manuel, Tarlac
- San Marcelino, Zambales ("Saint Marcellinus" or Spanish Governor General Marcelino de Oraá Lecumberri)
- San Mariano, Isabela ("Saint Marian")
- San Mateo, Isabela ("Saint Matthew")
- San Mateo, Rizal
- San Miguel, Bohol ("Saint Michael")
- San Miguel, Bulacan
- San Miguel, Catanduanes
- San Miguel, Iloilo
- San Miguel, Leyte
- San Miguel, Surigao del Sur
- San Miguel, Zamboanga del Sur
- San Narciso, Quezon ("Saint Narcissus")
- San Narciso, Zambales
- San Nicolas, Batangas ("Saint Nicholas")
- San Nicolas, Ilocos Norte
- San Nicolas, Pangasinan
- San Pablo, Isabela ("Saint Paul the Apostle")
- San Pablo, Zamboanga del Sur
- San Pascual, Batangas ("Saint Paschal Baylon")
- San Pascual, Masbate
- San Policarpo, Eastern Samar ("Saint Polycarp")
- San Quintin, Abra ("Saint Quentin")
- San Quintin, Pangasinan
- San Rafael, Bulacan ("Saint Raphael")
- San Rafael, Iloilo
- San Remigio, Antique ("Saint Remy")
- San Remigio, Cebu
- San Ricardo, Southern Leyte ("Saint Richard")
- San Roque, Northern Samar ("Saint Roch")
- San Sebastian, Samar ("Saint Sebastian")
- San Simon, Pampanga ("Saint Simon the Apostle")
- San Teodoro, Oriental Mindoro ("Saint Theodore")
- San Vicente, Camarines Norte ("Saint Vincent Ferrer")
- San Vicente, Ilocos Sur
- San Vicente, Northern Samar
- San Vicente, Palawan
- Sanchez-Mira, Cagayan (Spanish surname. Named after Spanish brigadier general Manuel Sanchez Mira.)
- Santa, Ilocos Sur ("Holy")
- Santa Ana, Cagayan ("Saint Anne")
- Santa Ana, Pampanga
- Santa Barbara, Iloilo ("Saint Barbara")
- Santa Barbara, Pangasinan
- Santa Catalina, Ilocos Sur ("Saint Catherine of Alexandria")
- Santa Catalina, Negros Oriental
- Santa Cruz, Davao del Sur ("Holy Cross")
- Santa Cruz, Ilocos Sur
- Santa Cruz, Laguna
- Santa Cruz, Marinduque
- Santa Cruz, Occidental Mindoro
- Santa Cruz, Zambales
- Santa Elena, Camarines Norte ("Saint Helena")
- Santa Fe, Cebu ("Holy Faith")
- Santa Fe, Leyte
- Santa Fe, Nueva Vizcaya
- Santa Fe, Romblon
- Santa Ignacia, Tarlac (Spanish name. Named after Filipino venerable Mother "Ignacia del Espíritu Santo")
- Santa Josefa, Agusan del Sur (derived from Santa Maria Josefa del Corazon de Jesus, Spanish for "Saint Mary Joseph of the Heart of Jesus.")
- Santa Lucia, Ilocos Sur ("Saint Lucy")
- Santa Magdalena, Sorsogon (derived from Santa Maria Magdalena, Spanish name for "Saint Mary Magdalene.)
- Santa Marcela, Apayao ("Saint Marcella")
- Santa Margarita, Samar ("Saint Margaret")
- Santa Maria, Bulacan ("Saint Mary")
- Santa Maria, Davao del Sur
- Santa Maria, Ilocos Sur
- Santa Maria, Isabela
- Santa Maria, Laguna
- Santa Maria, Pangasinan
- Santa Maria, Romblon
- Santa Monica, Surigao del Norte ("Saint Monica")
- Santa Praxedes, Cagayan ("Saint Praxedes")
- Santa Rita, Pampanga ("Saint Rita of Cascia")
- Santa Rita, Samar
- Santa Rosa, Nueva Ecija ("Saint Rose of Lima")
- Santa Teresita, Batangas ("Saint Therese of the Child Jesus")
- Santa Teresita, Cagayan
- Santander, Cebu (named after the city of Santander in Cantabria, Spain.)
- Santiago, Agusan del Norte ("Saint James the Great")
- Santiago, Ilocos Sur
- Santo Domingo, Albay ("Saint Dominic")
- Santo Domingo, Ilocos Sur
- Santo Domingo, Nueva Ecija
- Santo Niño, Cagayan ("Holy Child")
- Santo Niño, Samar
- Santo Niño, South Cotabato
- Santo Tomas, Davao del Norte ("Saint Thomas Aquinas")
- Santo Tomas, Isabela
- Santo Tomas, La Union
- Santo Tomas, Pampanga ("Saint Thomas the Apostle")
- Santo Tomas, Pangasinan
- Sebaste, Antique (Spanish/Latin, biblical place.)
- Senator Ninoy Aquino, Sultan Kudarat (Spanish name. Named after Filipino senator Benigno Aquino Jr.)
- Sergio Osmeña Sr., Zamboanga del Norte (Spanish name. Named after Filipino president Sergio Osmeña.)
- Sevilla, Bohol (named after the Spanish city of Seville.)
- Sierra Bullones, Bohol ("foggy mountains")
- Silvino Lobos, Northern Samar (Spanish name. Named after Filipino local leader Silvino Lobos.)
- Socorro, Oriental Mindoro (derived from Nuestra Señora del Perpetuo Socorro, Spanish name for "Our Lady of Perpetual Help.")
- Socorro, Surigao del Norte
- Sofronio Española, Palawan (Spanish name. Named after a Filipino politician.)
- Solana, Cagayan (named after the municipality of La Solana in Castile-La Mancha, Spain.)
- Solano, Nueva Vizcaya (Spanish surname. Named after Spanish Governor-General Ramón María Solano y Llanderal.)
- Solsona, Ilocos Norte (named after the town of Solsona in Catalonia, Spain.)
- Surallah, South Cotabato (derived from Sur de Alah, Spanish for "South Alah (Valley).")

=== T ===
- Talavera, Nueva Ecija (derived from Talavera de la Reina from a place in Spain.)
- Tarragona, Davao Oriental (named after the city of Tarragona in Catalonia, Spain.)
- Teresa, Rizal (Spanish given name. Named after Spanish politician Teresa Rodriguez Candelaria.)
- Tobias Fornier, Antique (Spanish name. Named after a Filipino politician.)
- Toboso, Negros Occidental (named after the town of El Toboso in Toledo, Spain.)
- Tolosa, Leyte (named after the town of Tolosa in the Basque Country, Spain.)
- Tomas Oppus, Southern Leyte (Spanish name. Named after Filipino politician Tomas G. Oppus.)
- Torrijos, Marinduque (named after the town of Torrijos in Toledo, Spain)
- Trento, Agusan del Sur (Spanish/Italian, named after the Italian holy city of "Trento.")
- Trinidad, Bohol (Spanish given name which means "trinity". Named after Filipino First Lady Trinidad Roxas.)
- Tudela, Cebu (named after the town of Tudela in Navarra, Spain.)
- Tudela, Misamis Occidental
- Tuy, Batangas (named after the town of Tuy in Galicia, Spain.)

=== U ===
- Urbiztondo, Pangasinan (Spanish surname. Named after Spanish Governor-General Juan Antonio de Urbiztondo, Marquis of La Solana.)

=== V ===
- Valderrama, Antique (Spanish surname. Named after Spanish Governor-General Manuel Blanco Valderrama.)
- Valencia, Bohol (named after the Spanish city of Valencia.)
- Valencia, Negros Oriental
- Valladolid, Negros Occidental (named after the city of Valladolid in Castile and León, Spain.)
- Vallehermoso, Negros Oriental ("beautiful valley")
- Veruela, Agusan del Sur (derived from Santa María de Veruela, Spanish for "Saint Mary of Veruela.")
- Victoria, Laguna ("victory". Named after Filipino presidential daughter Victoria Quirino-Delgado.)
- Victoria, Northern Samar
- Victoria, Oriental Mindoro
- Victoria, Tarlac
- Villaba, Leyte (derived from the Spanish town of Villalba.)
- Villanueva, Misamis Oriental (Spanish surname. Named after a Mexican-American military captain.)
- Villareal, Samar ("royal village")
- Villasis, Pangasinan (derived from Villacis. Named after Spanish Governor-General Rafael Maria Aguilar y Fernandez de Santillan Miño y Villacis.)
- Villaverde, Nueva Vizcaya ("green village". Named after Spanish missionary Juan Villaverde.)
- Villaviciosa, Abra (named after the town of Villaviciosa in Asturias, Spain which means "fertile village.")
- Vincenzo A. Sagun, Zamboanga del Sur (Spanish name. Named after a Filipino politician.)
- Vinzons, Camarines Norte (Spanish surname. Named after Filipino politician Wenceslao Vinzons.)

=== Z ===
- Zamboanguita, Negros Oriental ("Little Zamboanga")
- Zaragoza, Nueva Ecija (named after the Spanish city of Zaragoza.)
- Zarraga, Iloilo (Spanish surname. Named after Spanish politician Eugenio Pedro Zarraga.)
- Zumarraga, Samar (named after the town of Zumarraga in the Basque Country, Spain.)

== Region ==
- Cordillera Administrative Region

== Barrios and districts ==
This is not an exhaustive list.

- Arevalo
- Buena Suerte
- California
- Ciudad Real
- Egaña
- Fabrica
- Galicia
- Intramuros
- Los Angeles
- Milagrosa
- Palo Alto
- Pariancillo Villa
- Peñafrancia
- Poblacion
- Ramirez (son of Ramiro, King of Aragon), a barangay of Magallanes
- Rio Tuba
- San Buenaventura
- Santa Mesa
- Suarez
- Veinte Reales
- Villarica

== Islands ==
This is not an exhaustive list.

- Bajo de Masinloc ("Masinloc Shoal")
- Bantoncillo Island ("little Banton")
- Bucas Grande ("Big Bucas")
- Caballo Island ("Horse")
- Camotes Islands (sweet potatoes)
- Carabao Island ("Water Buffalo")
- Carlota Island
- Carnaza Island ("bait")
- Corregidor Island ("correction")
- Cuatro Islas ("Four Islands")
- Dos Hermanos Islands ("Two Brothers")
- El Fraile Island ("The Friar")
- Great Santa Cruz Island (Anglicized from Isla Grande de Santa Cruz)
- Isabel Island
- Isla de Convalecencia ("island of convalescence")
- Islas de Gigantes ("Islands of Giants")
- La Monja Island ("The Nun")
- Little Santa Cruz Island (Anglicized from Isla Chica de Santa Cruz)
- Maestre de Campo Island ("Field Commander")
- Malapascua Island ("Bad Christmas")
- Negros (Spanish for "blacks," referring to the dark-skinned Negritos that inhabited the island.) (the name applies to the entire island (Negros Oriental and Negros Occidental))
- Pan de Azucar Island ("sugar loaf")
- Pescador Island ("Fisherman")
- San Miguel Island
- Santiago Island
- Tablas Island ("Flanks")
- Verde Island ("Green")

== Mountains and hills ==
This is not an exhaustive list.

- Caraballo Mountains
- Cordillera Central
- Corregidor Caldera
- Cuernos de Negros
- Laguna Caldera
- Mount Halcon
- Mount Mirador
- Mount Santa Rita
- Mount Santo Tomas
- Mount Sembrano
- Sierra Madre

== Streets and roads ==
This is not an exhaustive list.

- Antero Soriano Highway
- Ayala Avenue
- Colon Street
- Doña Soledad Avenue
- Epifanio de los Santos Avenue
- Escolta Street
- España Boulevard
- Gregorio Araneta Avenue
- Julia Vargas Avenue
- Maria Clara L. Lobregat Highway
- Mendiola Street
- Ortigas Avenue
- Osmeña Boulevard
- Padre Burgos Avenue
- Paseo de Roxas

== Rivers ==
This is not an exhaustive list.

- Abra River
- Chico River
- Marikina River
- Muleta River
- Puerto Princesa Subterranean River
- Rio Grande de Cagayan
- Rio Grande de Mindanao
- Rio Grande de Pampanga
- San Cristobal River
- San Juan River
- Santa Cruz River

== Bays and inlets ==
- Cañacao Bay
- Honda Bay (Anglicized from Bahia Honda, lit. "deep bay")
- Illana Bay
- Isla Verde Passage
- Magellan Bay
- Moro Gulf
- San Bernardino Strait
- San Juanico Strait
- San Miguel Bay
- San Pedro Bay
- Tañon Strait

== Lakes ==
- La Mesa Lake
- Laguna de Bay
- Lake Venado
- San Roque Lake

== See also ==
- Spanish influence on Filipino culture
- List of Philippine provincial name etymologies
- List of Philippine city name etymologies
- List of Philippine place names of English origin
