= Names of the Philippines =

The nation's coat of arms showing its official name in Filipino, the national language of the Philippines

There have been several names of the Philippines (Filipino: Pilipinas, [pɪlɪˈpinɐs]; Spanish: Filipinas) in different cultures and at different times, usually in reference to specific island groups within the current archipelago. Even the name Philippines itself was originally intended to apply only to Leyte, Samar, and nearby islands. It was bestowed by the Spanish explorer Ruy López de Villalobos or one of his captains Bernardo de la Torre in 1543 in honor of the crown prince Philip, later Philip II. Mindanao, which they reached first and assumed to be the greater land, they named after the reigning emperor Charles V, who was also Spain's king Carlos I. Over the course of Spanish colonization, the name was eventually extended to cover the entire chain. It has survived with minor changes. The Philippine Revolution called its state the Philippine Republic (Spanish: República Filipina). The US military and civilian occupations called their territory the Philippine Islands (Spanish: Islas Filipinas). During the Third Philippine Republic, the state's official name was formally changed to the Philippines.

== Present name ==
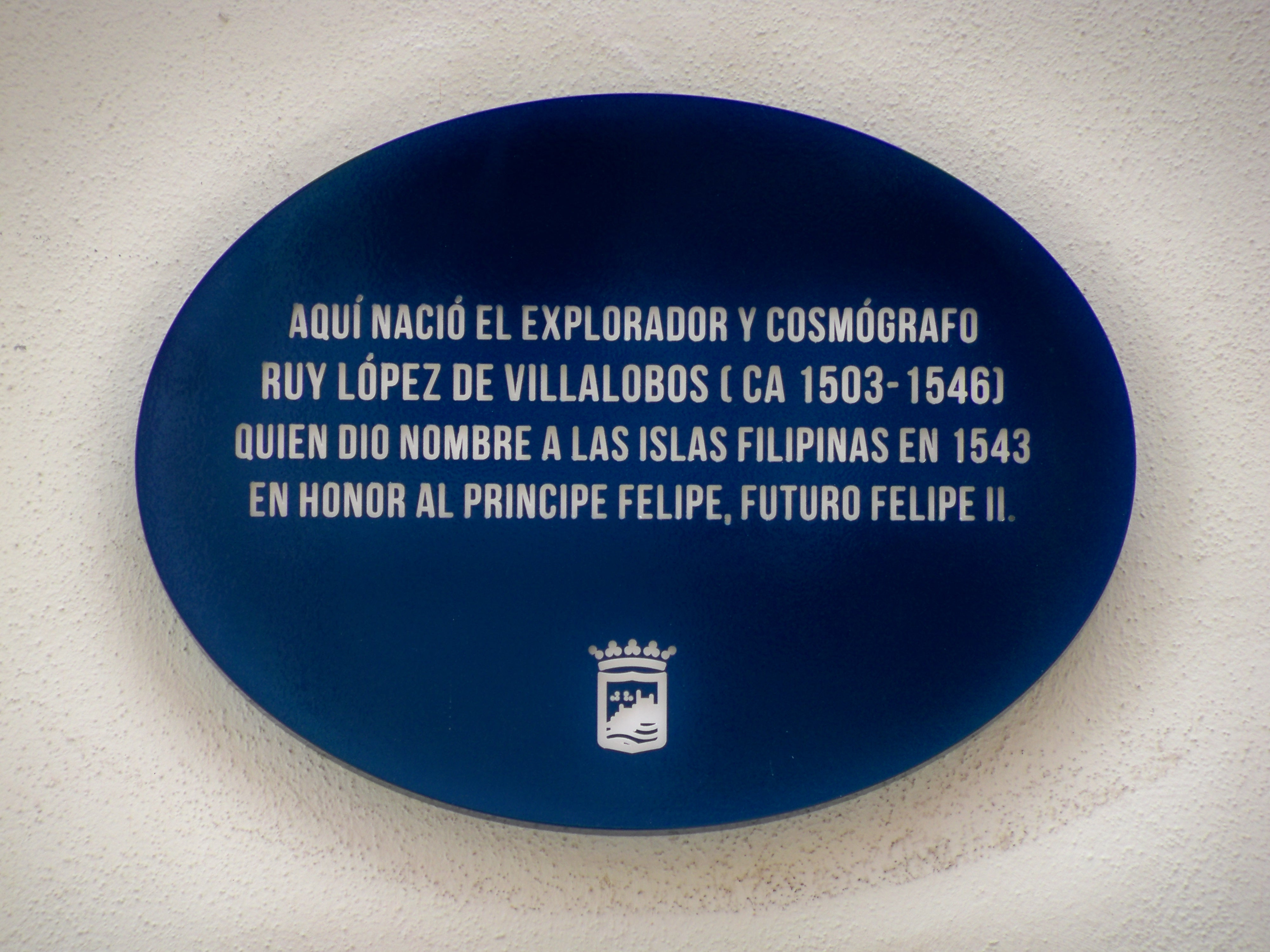
The plaque in Málaga, Spain, commemorating López de Villalobos for naming the Philippines. Some sources credit his captain Bernardo de la Torre for the name instead.

One of the earliest maps depicting the Philippines. A 1561 map of Southeast Asia by the Italian cartographer Giacomo Gastaldi, using the name Philippine Island (Latin: Philippina) for Leyte but not the entire archipelago

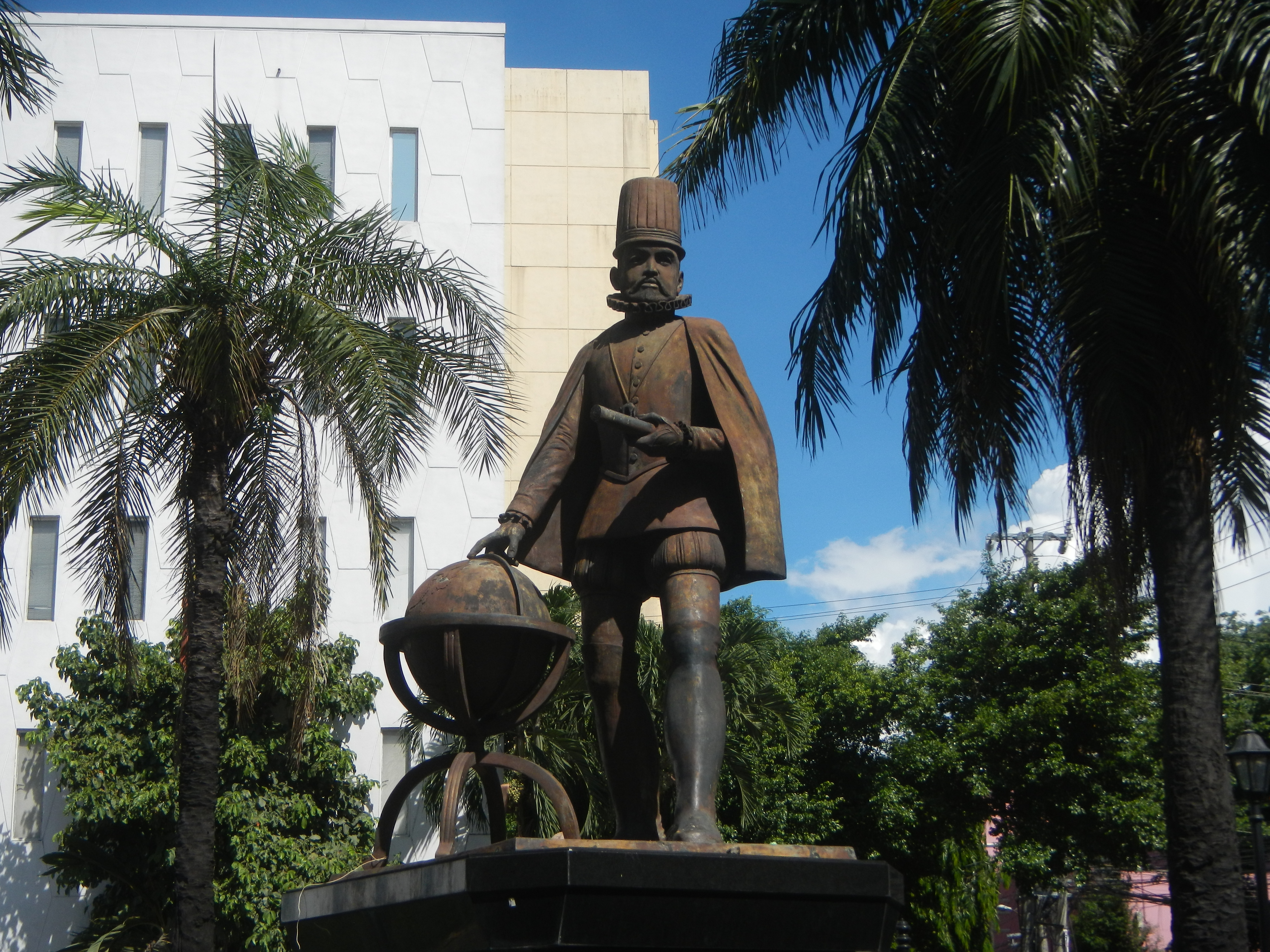
Philip II statue in Plaza de España inside the old Manila.

The present name of the Philippines was bestowed by the Spanish explorer Ruy López de Villalobos or one of his captains Bernardo de la Torre in 1543, during an expedition intended to establish greater Spanish control at the western end of the division of the world established between Spain and Portugal by the treaties of Tordesillas and Zaragoza. Having already named Mindanao for their king, the Habsburg emperor Charles V, the Philippine Island honored his son, crown prince Philip, later Philip II of Spain. The name Felipina and Islas Felipinas originally applied to only Leyte, Samar, and their nearby islands before shifting to Islas Filipinas and spreading to the rest. This was borrowed into English as the Philippine Islands soon after, a name which was used throughout America's military and civilian occupations of the archipelago.

=== Present name in other languages ===
The 1987 Constitution provides that Filipino and English be official languages of the Philippines. It does not contain a provision specifically designating an official name for the country; however, "Republic of the Philippines" is used consistently throughout its provisions (in English). Article XIV, section 8 of the Constitution also mandates that the constitution be also promulgated in Filipino but no such official Filipino version exists. "Republika ng Pilipinas" is the de facto name of the country used in Filipino. When standing alone in English, the country's name is always preceded by the article the. However, the definite article ang does not precede the name in Filipino contexts.

The country has throughout its history been known as Filipinas. The earliest known use of Pilipinas in Tagalog was by the Katipunan in their deciphered 1892 foundational document. In the 1930s, the scholar Lope K. Santos introduced the abakada alphabet for writing Tagalog which no longer used the letter F as this sound was absent and was usually pronounced by speakers of several Philippine languages as "P". The abakada alphabet also subsequently spread to other Philippine languages (which had been using spelling systems based on the Spanish abecedario). Thus, the form Pilipinas propagated and came into general use. The Commission on the Filipino Language and National Artist, Virgilio S. Almario urged the usage of Filipinas as the country's official name to reflect its origin and history, and to be inclusive of all languages in the country of which phonologies contain /f/, represented by the grapheme F in the present-day Philippine alphabet. This policy was later undone in 2021 by the new commissioner, Arthur Casanova, for being unconstitutional. The commission now recommends the use of Pilipinas over Filipinas when communicating in Filipino.

At international meetings, only the English name usually appears to identify the Philippines (e.g., when there are meetings in the United Nations or the Association of Southeast Asian Nations) in this setting. This is also the tradition even if the meeting is held within the Philippines. The country's name in other languages is more often than not based on either Filipinas or Philippines, both ultimately rooted in the Latin Philippinae.

Language	Short form (Philippines)	Transliteration	Long form (Republic of the Philippines)	Transliteration
Afrikaans	Filippyne		Republiek van die Filippyne	
Albanian	Filipinet		Republika e Filipineve	
Amharic	ፊሊፒንስ	Filipins	ፊሊፒንስ ሪፐብሊክ	Filipins Ripäblik
Arabic	الفِلِبِّين	al-Filibbīn	جُمْهُورِيَّةُ الفِلِبِّين	Jumhūrīyyatu al-Filibbīn
Armenian	Ֆիլիպիններ	Filipinner	Ֆիլիպիններում Հանրապետություն	Filippinerum Hanrapetut'yun
Azerbaijani	Filippin		Filippin Respublikası	
Basque	Filipinetan		Filipinetako Errepublikako	
Bambara	Filipine jamana na		Filipine jamana ka jamana	
Belarusian	Філіпіны	Filipiny	Рэспубліка Філіпіны	Respublika Filipiny
Bengali	ফিলিপাইন	Filipain	ফিলিপাইন প্রজাতন্ত্র	Filipain Projatôntro
Bulgarian	Филипини	Filipini	Република Филипини	Republika Filipini
Burmese	ဖိလစ်ပိုင်	Philipai	ဖိလစ်ပိုင်သမ္မတနိုင်ငံ	Philipai Thammada Nainggan
Cantonese	菲律賓	Fēileuhtbān	菲律賓共和國	Fēileuhtbān Guhngwòhgwok
Catalan	Filipines		República de les Filipines	
Croatian	Filipini		Republika Filipini	
Czech	Filipíny		Filipínská republika	
Danish	Filippinerne		Republikken Filippinerne	
Dutch	Filipijnen		Republiek der Filipijnen	
Esperanto	Filipinoj		Respubliko Filipinoj	
Estonian	Filipiinid		Filipiini Vabariik	
Finnish	Filippiinit		Filippiinien Tasavalta	
Fijian	Filipin		Matanitu Tugalala o Filipin	
French	Philippines		République des Philippines	
Georgian	ფილიპინები	P'ilipinebi	ფილიპინების რესპუბლიკა	P'ilipinebis respublika
German	Philippinen		Republik der Philippinen	
Greek	Φιλιππίνες	Filippínes	Δημοκρατία των Φιλιππίνων	Di̱mokratía to̱n Filippíno̱n
Haryanvi	फ़िलिपीण	Filippínn	फ़िलिपीण गणराज्य	Filippínn Gannrājya
Hebrew	פיליפינים	Filipinim	הרפובליקה של הפיליפינים	Ha'republika shel ha'Filipinim
Hindi	फ़िलीपीन्स	Filipīns	फ़िलीपींस गणराज्य	Filīpīns Gaṇarājya
Hokkien	菲律賓 呂宋	Hui-li̍p-pin; Lū-sòng	菲律賓共和國	Hui-li̍p-pin kiōng-hô-kok
Hungarian	Fülöp-szigetek		Fülöp-szigeteki Köztársaság	
Icelandic	Filippseyjar		Lýðveldið Filippseyjar	
Indonesian	Filipina		Republik Filipina	
Irish	Na hOileáin Fhilipíneacha		Poblacht na nOileán Filipíneacha	
Italian	Filippine		Repubblica delle Filippine	
Japanese	フィリピン	Firipin	フィリピン共和国	Firipin kyōwakoku
Kazakh	Филиппиндер	Filippinder	Филиппин Республикасы	Filippin Respublikasy
Khmer	ហ្វីលីពីន	Filippin	សាធារណរដ្ឋហ្វីលីពីន	Sathéaranakrâth Filippin
Korean	필리핀	Pillipin	필리핀 공화국	Pillipin Gonghwaguk
Kurdish	Filîpîn		Komara Filîpînan	
Lao	ຟີລິບປິນ	Filipin	ສາທາລະນະລັດຟີລິບປິນ	Sāthālanalat Filipin
Latin	Philippinae		Respublica Philippinarum	
Latvian	Filipīnas		Filipīnu Republika	
Lithuanian	Filipinai		Filipinų Respublika	
Lojban	pilipinas		la pilipinas. zei gubyseltru	
Macedonian	Филипини	Filipini	Република Филипини	Republika Filipini
Malaysian	Filipina		Republik Filipina	
Maltese	Filippini		Repubblika tal-Filippini	
Mandarin	菲律宾	Fēilǜbīn	菲律宾共和国	Fēilǜbīn Gònghéguó
Marathi	फिलिपिन्स	Filipins	फिलिपिन्सचे प्रजासत्ताक	Filipinsce prajāsattāk
Norwegian	Filippinene		Republikken Filippinene	
Persian	فیلیپین	Filipin	جمهوری فیلیپین	Jomhuri Filipin
Polish	Filipiny		Republika Filipin	
Portuguese	Filipinas		República das Filipinas	
Romanian	Filipine		Republica Filipinelor	
Russian	Филиппины	Filipiny	Республика Филиппины	Respublika Filipiny
Serbian	Филипини	Filipini	Република Филипини	Republika Filipini
Sinhala	පිලිපීනය	Pilipinaya	පිලිපීන ජනරජය	Pilipina Janarajaya
Slovak	Filipíny		Filipínska Republika	
Slovene	Filipini		Republika Filipini	
Somali	Filibiin		Jamhuuriyada Filibiin	
Spanish	Filipinas		República de Filipinas	
Swahili	Ufilipino		Jamhuri ya Ufilipino	
Swedish	Filippinerna		Republiken Filippinerna	
Tamil	பிலிப்பைன்ஸ்	Pilippaiṉs	பிலிப்பைன்ஸ் குடியரசு	Pilippaiṉs kuṭiyaracu
Thai	ฟิลิปปินส์	Filippin	สาธารณรัฐฟิลิปปินส์	Sāthāranarat Filippin
Turkish	Filipinler		Filipinler Cumhuriyeti	
Turkmen	Filippinler		Filippinler Respublikasy	
Ukrainian	Філіпіни	Filippiny	Республіка Філіппіни	Respublika Filippiny
Urdu	فلپائن	Filipāʾin	جمہوریہ فلپائن	Jamhūriya Filipāʾin
Uzbek	Filippin		Filippin Respublikasi	
Vietnamese	Phi-líp-pin / Phi Luật Tân		Cộng hoà Phi-líp-pin / Cộng hoà Phi Luật Tân	
Welsh	Philipinau		Gweriniaeth Ynysoedd y Philipinau	

== Historical names ==
In addition to the Philippines, the archipelago of a country has historically had numerous other names:

- Panyupayana. Scholars and traders from the Indian subcontinent historically referred to the Philippines as Panyupayana, a term which emanated from the geopolitical orientation of the Indians, that started with the cosmological orientation. This is manifested by the Puranas and other Indian literature, such as Ramayana and Mahabharata, which also has versions in the Philippines such as Maharadia Lawana.
- Ma-i. According to the Zhao Rugua's (趙汝适) book Zhu Fan Zhi (诸蕃志/諸蕃誌) written around the 13th century during the Song dynasty, there was a group of islands found in southern South China Sea called Ma-i (麻逸, Hokkien POJ: Mâ-i̍t, Mandarin Pinyin: Máyì). The islands groups were later invaded and renamed and identified by the Spanish to be the island of Mindoro. This was further proved by Ferdinand Blumentritt in his 1882 book, Versuch einer Ethnographie der Philippinen (An Attempt to the Study of Ethnography of the Philippines) that Ma-i was the Chinese local name of present-day Mindoro. On the other hand, historians claimed that Ma-i was not an island, but all the south of South Sea islands groups and Manila itself, which was known to be an overseas Chinese settlement which was in constant contact with the Chinese mainland as early as the 9th century AD.
  - Ma-i consists of the 三洲 (Hokkien POJ: Sam-chiu, Mandarin Pinyin: Sānzhōu, lit. "Three islands") group of islands: Kia-ma-yen (卡拉棉, Hokkien POJ: Khá-la-miân, Mandarin Pinyin: Kǎlāmián, "Calamian"), 巴拉望 (Hokkien POJ: Pa-la-bāng, Mandarin Pinyin: Bālāwàng, "Palawan") and Pa-ki-nung (布桑加, Hokkien POJ: Pò͘-song-ka, Mandarin Pinyin: Bùsāngjiā, "Busuanga").
    - Aside from 三洲, Ma-i also consists of the islands of Pai-p'u-yen (巴布延, Hokkien POJ: Pa-pò͘-iân, Mandarin Pinyin: Bābùyán, "Babuyan"), P'u-li-lu (波利略, Hokkien POJ: Po-lī-lio̍k, Mandarin Pinyin: Bōlìlüè, "Polillo"), Lim-kia-tung (林加延, Hokkien POJ: Lîm-ka-iân, Mandarin Pinyin: Línjiāyán, "Lingayen"), Liu-sung (呂宋, Hokkien POJ: Lū-sòng, Mandarin Pinyin: Lǚsòng, "Luzon") and Li-ban (盧邦, Hokkien POJ: Lô͘-pang, Mandarin Pinyin: Lúbāng, "Lubang"). It was said that these islands had contacts with Chinese traders from Canton (Guangdong) as early as 982 AD.
  - Liusung (呂宋, Hokkien POJ: Lū-sòng, Mandarin Pinyin: Lǚsòng) was the name ascribed by the Chinese to the present-day island of Luzon. It originated from the Tagalog word lusong, a wooden mortar that is used to pound rice. When the Spanish produced maps of the Philippines during the early 17th century, they called the island Luçonia which was later respelled as Luzonia, then Luzon.
- Las islas de San Lázaro (St. Lazarus' Islands). Named by Ferdinand Magellan in 1521 when he reached the islands of Homonhon in Samar (now Eastern Samar) on the feast day of Saint Lazarus of Bethany.
- Las islas de Poniente (Islands to the West). Another name from Ferdinand Magellan in 1521 when he learned that the Las islas de San Lázaro also included Cebu and Leyte islands. However, various sources claimed that Magellan was not the one who renamed the area, but his chroniclers instead. The name came from the fact that the islands were reached from Spain en route approaching the left part of the globe. Conversely, the Portuguese called the archipelago Ilhas do oriente (Islands to the East) because they approached the islands from the east of Portugal in the late 1540s.
  - The Portuguese referred the whole island of Luzon as ilhas Luções, or Luzones Islands.
  - Mindanao was formerly called ilhas de Liquíos Celebes because of the existence of Celebes Sea south of Mindanao.
  - Caesarea Caroli or Karoli was the name given by Villalobos or De la Torre to the island of Mindanao when they reached the sea near it in 1543. This was named after Charles V of the Holy Roman Empire (and I of Spain).
  - The southern island of Sarangani was renamed by Villalobos as Antonia, in honor of Antonio de Mendoza y Pacheco, the Viceroy of New Spain who commissioned Villalobos expedition to the Philippines.
  - Villalobos also named the littoral zone between the islands of Samar and Leyte as Tendaya.
  - King Philip II of Spain, through a Royal Decree, bestowed the name Nuevo Reino de Castilla (New Kingdom of Castilla) to the island of Luzon during the expedition of Miguel López de Legazpi.
- Pearl of the Orient/Pearl of the Orient Seas (Spanish: Perla de oriente/Perla del mar de oriente) is the sobriquet of the Philippines. The term originated from the idea of Spanish Jesuit missionary Fr. Juan J. Delgado in 1751. In his last poem Mi último adiós, Dr. José Rizal referred the country with this name. In the 1960 revision of Lupang Hinirang, the Philippine national anthem, the Tagalog version of this phrase was included as the translation from the original Spanish.

Mi último adiós, original Spanish (1896, first stanza)

Adios, Patria adorada, region del sol querida,
Perla del Mar de Oriente, nuestro perdido Eden!
A darte voy alegre la triste mustia vida,
Y fuera más brillante más fresca, más florida,
Tambien por tí la diera, la diera por tu bien.

English translation

Farewell, my adored Land, region of the sun caressed,
Pearl of the Orient Sea, our Eden lost,
With gladness I give you my Life, sad and repressed;
And were it more brilliant, more fresh and at its best,
I would still give it to you for your welfare at most.

"Lupang Hinirang", official Filipino lyrics
(1958, rev. 1960s, first stanza)

Bayang magiliw,
Perlas ng Silanganan
Alab ng puso,
Sa Dibdib mo'y buhay.

Original Spanish lyrics

Tierra adorada,
hija del sol de Oriente,
su fuego ardiente
en ti latiendo está.

=== Uncertain names ===
- Maniolas. According to Fr. Francisco Colin in 1663, a Jesuit cleric and an early historian of the Philippines, Maniolas was the name used by Claudius Ptolemy to refer to the group of islands south of China (i.e. Luzon). Colin quoted Ptolemy's writings speaking about the Maniolas islands, which is probably Manila. This theory was further supported by José Rizal and Pedro A. Paterno. Rizal also said that the country was recorded to Ptolemy's maps when a sailor named Hippalus told him the existence of "beautiful islands" in southeastern Far East. However, Trinidad Pardo de Tavera rejected this notion on his 1910 book, Notas para una cartografia de Filipinas (Notes for the Philippine Cartography).
- Baroussai. Along with Maniolas is the Baroussai which was also quoted from Ptolemy. Barrousai is believed to be the Visayas with Mindanao, thus, composing majority of the now Philippine archipelago. Some scholars however have identified Baroussai with Barus in Sumatra.
- Ophir (Hebrew: אוֹפִיר) is a region of islands mentioned in the Bible, most famous for its wealth. Accounts mention that King Solomon received the riches of the region every three years. At the emergence of the hydrography of Spanish colonies in Asia in the early 17th century, Dominican Gregorio García wrote that Ophir was indeed located in the Moluccas and the Philippines. In 1609, Juan de Pineda wrote a diverse collection of literature relating Biblical accounts of Solomon, Ophir and the islands. Former Prime Minister Pedro A. Paterno said in one of his works on conjectural anthropology that Ophir is the Philippines because the scented wood Solomon received from Ophir also exists in the Islands. This notion was however, later dismissed by modern historians as merely alluding and comparing the Philippines' position to the Spanish economy with that of Ophir to Solomon's kingdom—the sudden discovery and colonisation of the Islands bringing wealth and prosperity to the realm.
- Tawalisi, was an ancient kingdom in Southeast Asia reached by explorer Ibn Battuta. He reached the kingdom when he left Sumatra and headed towards China. According to the historical accounts of the explorer, he met Urduja, a legendary warrior princess from Pangasinan. However, according to William Henry Scott, Tawilisi and its warrior-princess Urduja are "fabulous, fairy-tale, fiction".

== Proposals for renaming ==
During the Third Philippine Republic is when the shortened name Philippines began to appear a name that was officially adopted.

Since the official naming of the country as "the Philippine Islands" under American colonial rule and even earlier as "Filipinas", etc. under Spanish colonial rule, the primary reason for the country's name-change has always been "to break away from colonialism". A holistically government-backed name has yet to be determined, although a pan-Malay word reflecting the nation's island identity has been proposed as more appropriate, or one related to the archipelago's pre-Hispanic excellence in sailing and boat-building.

=== Proposed names ===
- Haring Bayang Katagalugan (Sovereign Tagalog Nation). Andrés Bonifacio's suggested name for the Filipino nation, intended to be governed by the 1896–1897 Republika ng Katagalugan (Tagalog Republic), although unrecognized by non-Tagalog Filipinos. The name drew flak because of connotations of regionalism. A historian claimed that Bonifacio's usage of "Katagalugan" was not meant to demean other ethnic groups as the word itself meant "people of the river", from the word "taga-ilog", which supposed to represent the ocean-faring ancestors of all Philippine ethnic groups. This was later used by Macario Sakay for his 1902–1906 government that was suppressed by the Americans.
- Kapatiran ("Brotherhood"), or its semi-equivalent Katipunan ("Assembly"/"Gathering").
- Luzviminda. A portmanteau of the first syllables of the country's three major island groups: Luzon; Visayas; and Mindanao. The term has sometimes been interchanged with Luzvimindas, due to the territorial claim of the country on eastern Sabah in Borneo.

- Mahárlika (Sanskrit: mahardhikka (महर्द्धिक), "freeman"). In Pre-Hispanic Philippines, the mahárlika was the common Tagalog term for freedmen, not for the royalty. The maharlika were the largest sector of society, and included warriors, artisans, artists, and others. Unlike the rulers, maharlika did not participate in politics. In 1978, then-president and dictator Ferdinand Marcos supported a House Bill mandating the country's renaming to Mahárlika under military rule. Marcos claimed that Mahárlika was the name of the guerilla force he allegedly led during World War II. This claim would later be disproven, as testified by an Army investigation which "found no foundation" for the late dictator's claims. Eddie Ilarde, who filed the bill, wrongfully stated that Maharlika connoted royalty and wrongfully translated the term as "nobly created". In the book Vocabulario de la lengua tagala, the term translates into "alipin na itinuring na malaya" or "a slave that was treated as free". Historians noted that in some accounts, the term means "big phallus" or "large male genitalia". The bill did not pass since the term was seen by numerous ethnic groups as "imperial in nature". The proposal was revived by populist president Rodrigo Duterte in February 2019, but the name was dropped a month later. The name change was still supported by the government, although a new name had to be determined.
- Malaysia. Filipino politicians also suggested adopting the name for the country. A bill in the Senate was presented in 1962 to change the name of the Philippines to Malaysia, but leaders of the nationalist movement of the modern state would adopt the name while the bill was in Congress.
- Rizalia. Named after Filipino patriot José Rizal, in a similar fashion to Bolivia being named after Simón Bolivar.

- República Rizalina ("Rizaline Republic"). While exiled in Japan, former revolutionary general Artemio Ricarte proposed the name and had already drafted a constitution for this attempt at a revolutionary government. The term has been pushed by many pro-Rizal Filipinos, however, the term itself is criticized by many as Rizal was not in favor of Philippine independence during the Philippine revolution against Spain as he believed that the Philippines was "not yet ready" to be separated from "mother Spain". However, historians agree through surfaced historical documents that Rizal "believed in the supreme right of revolution" but "did not think it timely in 1896, and considered the people and the country unprepared for it."

== See also ==
- List of Philippine provincial name etymologies
- List of Philippine city name etymologies
- Toponymy
