= List of Philippine place names of English origin =

As a consequence of former American and, also earlier for a short period, British sovereignty over the islands that are now the Philippines, there are many places in the country with English names.

English has been one of the country's two official languages since independence from the United States in 4 July 1946. As a result, many place names have either been translated to or given new English names. The name Philippines is itself anglicised from the islands' Spanish name, Filipinas.

== Province ==
- Mountain Province

== Municipalities ==
- Adams, Ilocos Norte
- Allen, Northern Samar (named after American military governor Robert Allen.)
- Boston, Davao Oriental (named after the American city of Boston.)
- Brooke's Point, Palawan (named after the British ruler of Sarawak James Brooke.)
- Conner, Apayao (named after American governor Norman Conner.)
- General MacArthur, Eastern Samar (named after the American general Douglas MacArthur.)
- Jones, Isabela (named after American legislator William Atkinson Jones.)
- Lakewood, Zamboanga del Sur (named after American governor general Leonard Wood.)
- MacArthur, Leyte
- New Washington, Aklan (named after the first U.S. president George Washington.)
- Saint Bernard, Southern Leyte (named after Saint Bernard.)
- Taft, Eastern Samar (named after the U.S. president and former civil governor William Howard Taft.)
- Turtle Islands, Tawi-Tawi

== Barrios and districts ==
- Addition Hills
- Bay City
- Beverly Hills
- Brookspoint
- Clark Freeport Zone
- Camp John Hay
- Camp O'Donnell
- Eastwood City
- Forbes Park
- Greenhills, San Juan
- Newport City
- Rockwell Center
- Triangle Park

== Islands ==
- Crocodile Island
- Fortune Island (from the Spanish origin "Isla de Fortun")
- Hundred Islands (from the Spanish origin "Las Cien Islas")
- White Island

== Mountains and volcanoes ==
- Cleopatra Needle
- Mount Leonard Kniaseff
- Mount Parker
- Mount Victoria
- Mount Saint Paul
- Smith Volcano
- Sleeping Beauty Mountain
- Thumb Peak

== Lakes ==
- Alligator Lake
- Lake Ernestine
- Lake Leonard
- Lake Wood

== Highways and roads ==
This is not an exhaustive list.

- Airport Road
- Andrews Avenue
- Annapolis Street
- Commonwealth Avenue
- Connecticut Street
- Congressional Avenue
- Dalton Pass
- East Avenue
- Elliptical Road
- F.B. Harrison Street
- Fields Avenue
- Gilmore Avenue
- Governor's Drive
- Kennon Road
- Lawton Avenue
- MacArthur Highway
- McKinley Road
- New York Street
- North Avenue
- Pioneer Avenue
- Roosevelt Avenue
- Session Road
- Shaw Boulevard
- Taft Avenue
- United Nations Avenue
- Wilson Street
- Wyoming Street

== See also ==
- List of Philippine provincial name etymologies
- List of Philippine city name etymologies
- List of Philippine place names of Spanish origin
