= Gingoog =

Component city in Misamis Oriental, Philippines

- Component city
- City of Gingoog
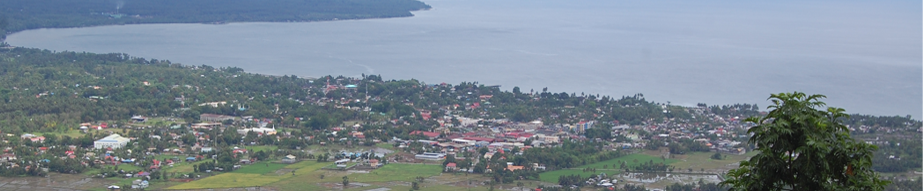
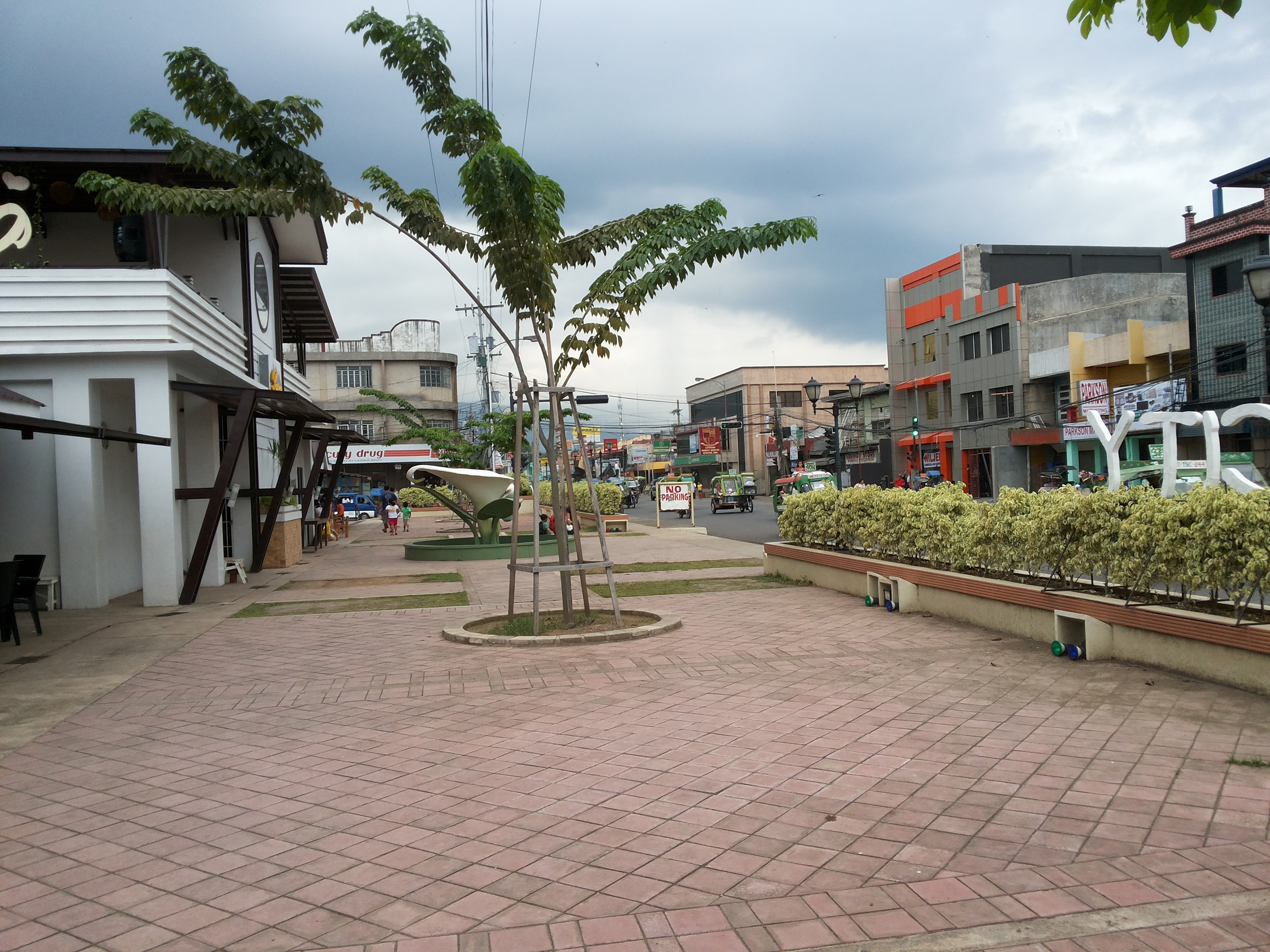
- From top, left to right: Skyline view, Downtown, Cebu Pacific Flight 387 Memorial Park

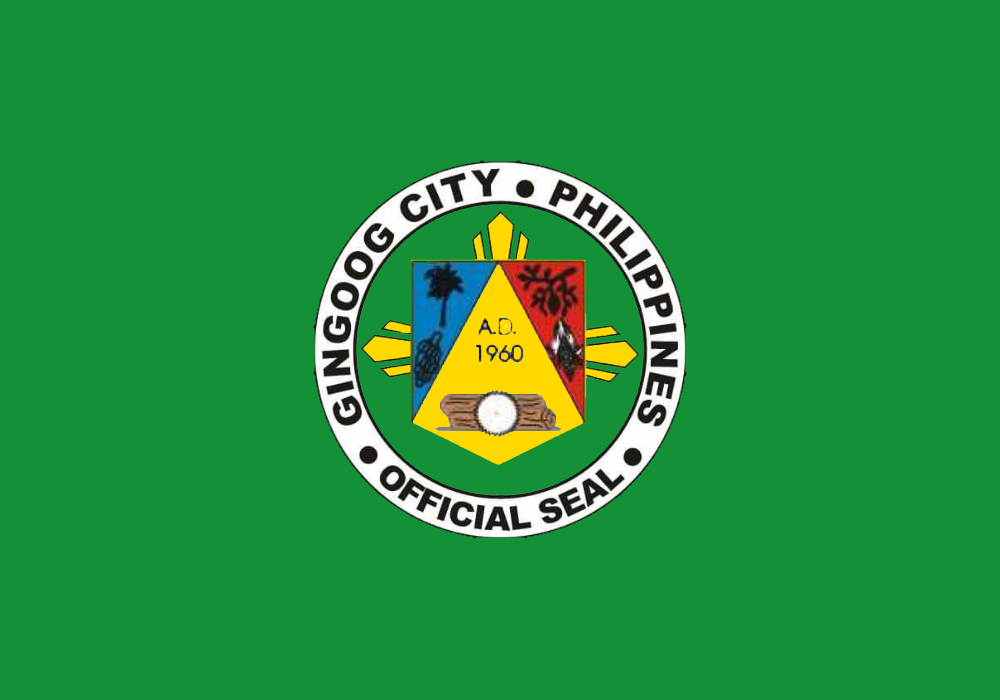
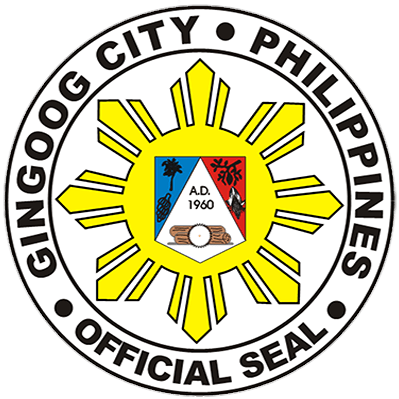
- Flag Seal
- Nickname: City of Good luck
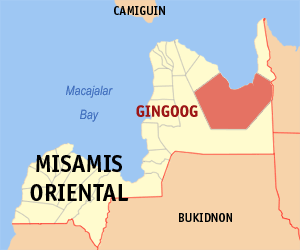
- Map of Misamis Oriental with Gingoog highlighted
- Interactive map of Gingoog
- Location within the Philippines
- Coordinates: 8°49′N 125°06′E
- Country: Philippines
- Region: Northern Mindanao
- Province: Misamis Oriental
- District: 1st district
- Settled: 1750
- Incorporated: 1908
- Cityhood: June 18, 1960
- Barangays: 79 (see Barangays)

Government
  - Type: Sangguniang Panlungsod
  - Mayor: Erick G. Cañosa
  - Vice Mayor: Thaddeus "Tadoy" Lugod
  - Representative: Karen Lagbas
  - City Council: Members: Evelyn G. Cañosa; Patpat Guanzon; Jerome Magan; Steph Kho; Jam Militante; Bebot Villahermosa; Agaw Motoomull; Alam Na Gomez; Judeline Bernaldez; Rodrigande Miole
  - Electorate: 96,058 voters (2025)

Area
  - Total: 568.44 km^{2} (219.48 sq mi)
- Elevation: 476 m (1,562 ft)
- Highest elevation: 2,411 m (7,910 ft)
- Lowest elevation: 0 m (0 ft)

Population (2024 census)
  - Total: 138,895
  - Density: 244.34/km^{2} (632.85/sq mi)
  - Households: 31,148

Economy
  - Income class: 1st city income class
  - Poverty incidence: 30.55% (2023)
  - Revenue: ₱ 1,535 million (2024)
  - Assets: ₱ 4,896 million (2024)
  - Expenditure: ₱ 1,407 million (2024)
  - Liabilities: ₱ 874.4 million (2024)

Service provider
  - Electricity: Misamis Oriental 2 Rural Electric Cooperative (MORESCO 2)
- Time zone: UTC+8 (PST)
- ZIP code: 9014
- PSGC: 104308000
- IDD : area code: +63 (0)88
- Native languages: Cebuano; Binukid; Subanon; Tagalog
- Website: https://www.gingoog.gov.ph

Gingoog (Binukid pronunciation: ['hiŋuʔog] HEE-ngu-og), officially the City of Gingoog (Cebuano: Dakbayan sa Hingoog; Filipino: Lungsod ng Gingoog), is a component city in the province of Misamis Oriental, Philippines. According to the 2024 census, it has a population of 138,895 people.

Like other municipalities in the Philippines that retained Spanish-based orthography, the city name is spelled as Gingoog but is pronounced as ['hiŋuʔog] or HEE-ngu-og since it originated as a Binukid word.

== History ==
The term Gingoog originally came from the word "Hingoog", which means "Goodluck", from a Lumad tribe of Manobo who settled in the area. The word implies good fortune, thus Gingoog means the "City of Good Luck". The natives of this place are the ones with the family names of "Gingco", and "Gingoyon".

Gingoog was founded as a mission by Spanish missionaries in 1750. It was one of the oldest localities in Misamis Oriental Province, older than the province's capital and economic hub, Cagayan de Oro which was founded in 1871. During the late Spanish colonial period, influential families of Spanish descent settled and governed the area. They built large, two-story wooden ancestral houses in the traditional Spanish-colonial style, which remain preserved in the old downtown (Poblacion) area today. Among them, Don Manuel Lugod became the town's first Spanish language teacher and a prominent local pioneer.

The territory of then-independent Gingoog was made part of Talisayan for a while, since the passage of Act No. 951, issued by the Philippine Commission on October 21, 1903, which reduced the number of municipalities in the then-undivided Misamis province from 24 to 10, until becoming the first former municipality to be reconstituted thereafter through Act No. 1618, enacted on March 20, 1907 and took effect on August 10.

During the early 20th century, with its abundant natural resources, Gingoog slowly continued to edge forward their economic progress, attracting migrants from Luzon and Visayas to settle in the area as their new home. After the World War II, the fast and vast production output of agriculture (specifically coconut & coffee) and logging industry created a momentum of progress that led to the initiation of Gingoog’s early independence from the Province of Misamis Oriental.

In 1957, the sitio of Binuangan was converted into a barrio known as Talisay.

=== Cityhood ===
Gingoog was turned into a city via Republic Act No. 2668 signed by President Carlos P. Garcia circa June 18, 1960.

On October 19, 1978, Miguel Paderanga of Mahinog, Misamis Oriental (now part of Camiguin) was appointed by president Ferdinand Marcos as the new mayor of Gingoog City.

== Geography ==
Gingoog is located in the Province of Misamis Oriental in the Northern Mindanao Region on Mindanao island. The city is approximately 122 kilometres (76 mi) east of Cagayan de Oro and 74 kilometres (46 mi) west of Butuan. It is bounded on the east by the Municipality of Magsaysay; on the west by the Municipality of Medina; on the south by the Municipality of Claveria; and on the north by Gingoog Bay. Its total land area is 56,844 hectares (140,460 acres).

=== Barangays ===
Gingoog is politically subdivided into 79 barangays. Each barangay consists of puroks while some have sitios.

In 1957, the sitio of Malibod was converted into a barrio.

The 79 barangays are the following:

- Agay-ayan
- Alagatan
- Anakan
- Bagubad
- Bakidbakid
- Bal-ason
- Bantaawan
- Binakalan
- Capitulangan
- Daan-Lungsod
- Dinawehan
- Eureka
- Hindangon
- Kalagonoy
- Kalipay
- Kamanikan
- Kianlagan
- Kibuging
- Kipuntos
- Lawaan
- Lawit
- Libertad
- Libon
- Lunao
- Lunotan
- Malibud
- Malinao
- Maribucao
- Mimbuntong
- Mimbalagon
- Mimbunga
- Minsapinit
- Murallon
- Odiongan
- Pangasihan
- Pigsaluhan
- Punong
- Ricoro
- Samay
- Sangalan
- San Jose
- San Juan
- San Luis
- San Miguel
- Santiago
- Tagpako
- Talisay
- Talon
- Tinabalan
- Tinulongan
- Barangay 1
- Barangay 2
- Barangay 3
- Barangay 4
- Barangay 5
- Barangay 6
- Barangay 7
- Barangay 8
- Barangay 9
- Barangay 10
- Barangay 11
- Barangay 12
- Barangay 13
- Barangay 14
- Barangay 15
- Barangay 16
- Barangay 17
- Barangay 18
- Barangay 18-A
- Barangay 19
- Barangay 20
- Barangay 21
- Barangay 22
- Barangay 22-A
- Barangay 23
- Barangay 24
- Barangay 24-A
- Barangay 25
- Barangay 26

=== Climate ===
Climate data for Gingoog, Misamis Oriental
Month	Jan	Feb	Mar	Apr	May	Jun	Jul	Aug	Sep	Oct	Nov	Dec	Year
Mean daily maximum °C (°F)	28 (82)	28 (82)	29 (84)	30 (86)	30 (86)	30 (86)	30 (86)	30 (86)	30 (86)	29 (84)	29 (84)	28 (82)	29 (85)
Mean daily minimum °C (°F)	23 (73)	23 (73)	23 (73)	23 (73)	25 (77)	25 (77)	25 (77)	25 (77)	25 (77)	25 (77)	24 (75)	24 (75)	24 (75)
Average precipitation mm (inches)	327 (12.9)	254 (10.0)	185 (7.3)	128 (5.0)	215 (8.5)	273 (10.7)	248 (9.8)	243 (9.6)	214 (8.4)	246 (9.7)	271 (10.7)	271 (10.7)	2,875 (113.3)
Average rainy days	24.3	21.1	22.5	20.6	28.3	28.8	29.4	29.0	28.0	28.3	26.0	24.2	310.5
Source: Meteoblue

== Demographics ==
Population census of Gingoog
Year	Pop.	±% p.a.
1903	2,876	—
1918	5,391	+4.28%
1939	16,746	+5.55%
1948	30,699	+6.97%
1960	52,677	+4.60%
1970	65,522	+2.20%
1975	66,577	+0.32%
1980	79,937	+3.72%
1990	82,582	+0.33%
1995	87,530	+1.10%
2000	102,379	+3.42%
2007	112,247	+1.28%
2010	117,908	+1.81%
2015	124,648	+1.06%
2020	136,698	+1.96%
2024	138,895	+0.38%
Source: Philippine Statistics Authority

=== Languages ===
The majority of Gingoog's population speak Cebuano (spoken with Northern Mindanao variant), although the early inhabitants of the city are mostly Higaonons, who still inhabit the mountains to avoid contact with migrants from Cebu, Bohol, Siquijor and Negros Oriental who came to the area and occupied the coastal parts of the area long before Spanish presence in the area. There is also a sizeable speakers of Boholano dialect of Cebuano in Gingoog. Higaonon is also spoken by the city's indigenous people of the same name who live in the mountains. Tagalog/Filipino and English are widely understood and often used for administrative functions by the local government and in education, with the former is also varyingly spoken with Batangas dialect due to ethnic Tagalog residents who came from Batangas in various numbers. Other languages also spoken varyingly in Gingoog are Bicolano, Ilocano, Hiligaynon, Kapampangan, Pangasinan, Waray, Butuanon, Surigaonon, as well as Maranao, Maguindanaon and Tausug.

== Economy ==
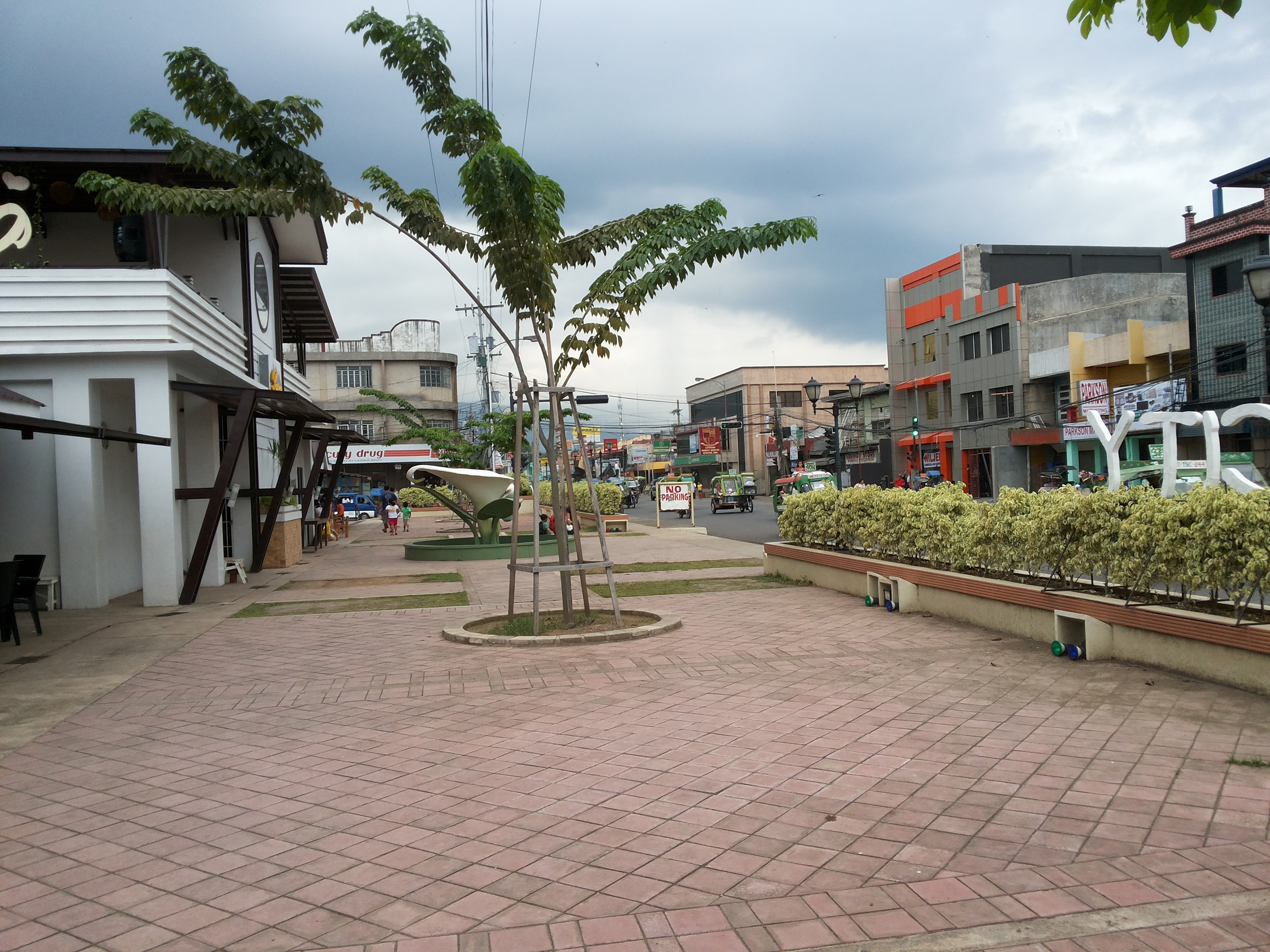
Downtown Gingoog

Poverty incidence of Gingoog (%)

Source: Philippine Statistics Authority

The city's total income during year 2000 reached ₱296,731.65, of which 292,077.262.40 or 98.43% accrued in the general fund while ₱4,653,809.25 or 1.5% accrued in the special education fund. Comparatively, the 1999 income level of ₱250.64 million has increased by ₱46.09 million or 18.39%. The biggest bulk of the city's income was derived from tax revenues complementing around 95.5% of the total earnings of the year. One major component of this income class is the Internal Revenue Allotment (IRA) which contributed a total amount of ₱259.69 million or 93.04%. Said IRA has increased by ₱37.43 million or 16.83% against that of 1999. Local revenue contributed only 10.04% of the city's total annual income.

Total expenditure incurred by the city for the whole year reached to about ₱243.54 million, of which ₱239.66 million was spent from the general fund and ₱3.88 million was spent from the special education Fund. Comparatively, an increase of about ₱9.76 million or 4.17% over 1999.

By expense class, personal services absorbed as much as ₱161.74 million or 66.41%. That includes the services of the devolved employees, newly created positions as mandated by R.A. 7160 and project engaged workers. Maintenance and other operating expenses followed with ₱45.35 million, or 18.62%, then capital outlay with ₱36.46 million, or 14.97%.

== Government ==
=== List of mayors ===
- Perfecto Ubalde (1955–1959)
- Julio J. Ganaban (1959–1963)
- Domingo C. de Lara (1963–1967)
- Romulo Rodriguez Jr. (1967–1971)
- Arturo S. Lugod (1971–1978; 1988–1995)
- Miguel Paderanga (1978–1986)
- Romulo Rodriguez (1995–2004)
- Ruth S. de Lara-Guingona (2004–2013)
- Stella Marie Guingona (2013–2019)
- Erick Cañosa (2019–present)
