= Mount Mirador =

Mountain in Baguio, Philippines

- Location within Luzon Location within Philippines

Highest point
- Coordinates: 16°25′00″N 120°35′00″E

Geography
- Location: Luzon
- Country: Philippines
- Region: Cordillera Administrative Region
- Province: Benguet
- City/municipality: Baguio
- Parent range: Cordillera Central

Mount Mirador is a mountain situated in the city of Baguio in the Cordillera Central mountain range, Luzon Island in the Philippines. A meteorological station was established in September 1909 and was the second highest station during that time with the first being the meteorological station in Mount Fuji. Said station was also equipped with a time ball and a typhoon signal for the benefit of Baguio city.

The mountain provided pockets of Japanese resistance against the USAFIP-NL military and guerrilla regiment during the liberation of Baguio city.
