= Saint Richard =

Saint Richard is usually Richard of Chichester (otherwise Richard of Wych(e), Richard of Droitwich, and Richard of Burford) and may also refer to

- Richard the Pilgrim (died 720), Anglo-Saxon saint, supposed father of Saints Willibald, Winibald, and Walpurga
- Richard of Vaucelles (died 1169), French saint
- Richard of Andria (died 1196), Italian saint
- Richard of Chichester, (c. 1197–1253), English saint
- Richard Reynolds (martyr) (c. 1492–1535), English saint
- Richard Gwyn (c. 1537–1584), Welsh saint
- Richard Martin (martyr) (died 1588), English saint
- Richard Pampuri (1897–1930), Italian saint

== See also ==
- Richardis (c. 840–895), French saint
