= Magellan Bay =

- Location within the Philippines Magellan Bay (Philippines)
- Location: Cebu, Philippines
- Coordinates: 10°19′51.6″N 124°1′10.92″E
- Type: bay
- Part of: Camotes Sea
- Settlements: Lapu-Lapu

Magellan Bay is a bay located northeast of Mactan Island, near the city of Lapu-Lapu in the Philippines. The bay is named after the Portuguese explorer Ferdinand Magellan, who was killed in this area by the forces of Lapu-Lapu.
