= Misamis =

Misamis can refer to two present-day provinces in the Philippines:

- Misamis Occidental
- Misamis Oriental

"Misamis" is sometimes used to refer to both provinces. It may also refer to :

- Misamis (province), the former undivided province, corresponds to the present provinces of Misamis Occidental, Misamis Oriental, Camiguin, Bukidnon, Lanao del Sur, Lanao del Norte, some parts of Zamboanga del Norte, and some parts of Cotabato.

Cities

- Ozamiz, previously known as Misamis, a city located in Misamis Occidental
- Cagayan de Oro, also known as Cagayan de Misamis, capital of the province of Misamis Oriental
