= Mindoro (disambiguation) =

Mindoro is an island in the Philippines.

Mindoro may also refer to:

- Mindoro (province), a Philippines province of 1921–1950 on the island
- Battle of Mindoro, a World War II battle between Japan and the United States on the island
- Mindoro Airport, in the Philippines (but not on the island)
- USS Mindoro (CVE-120) (1945–1961), a ship of the U.S. Navy
- Mindoro, Wisconsin, United States, an unincorporated community

== Species ==
- Mindoro black rat
- Mindoro bleeding-heart, a bird
- Mindoro bulbul, a songbird
- Mindoro climbing rat
- Mindoro crocodile
- Mindoro hawk-owl
- Mindoro imperial pigeon
- Mindoro narrow-disked gecko
- Mindoro racket-tail, a parrot
- Mindoro scops owl
- Mindoro shrew
- Mindoro stripe-faced fruit bat
- Mindoro striped rat
- Mindoro tree frog
- Mindoro warty pig
