= List of provincial name etymologies of the Philippines =

List of provinces of the Philippines and their name origins

The provinces of the Philippines are mainly named after geographic features like rivers and islands, after abundant flora and fauna, after ethnic groups or individuals, or bear a name of older local origin.

== Directions in Spanish ==
Some provinces are prefixed/suffixed with a Spanish word denoting one of the four cardinal directions. These are:

- Spanish: Norte, lit. 'North'
  - Spanish: del Norte, lit. 'of the North'
- Spanish: Sur, lit. 'South'
  - Spanish: del Sur, lit. 'of the South'
- Spanish: Oriental, lit. 'East'
- Spanish: Occidental, lit. 'West'

== Provincial names ==
Abra

- abra, Spanish: abra, lit. 'gap; opening'. Originally the area called in Spanish: El Abra de Vigan, lit. 'The Gap/Opening of Vigan', only referred to the narrow but conspicuous gap along the Malayan (Ilocos) mountain range through which the Tineg River has cut an exit. This topographic feature, now called the Banaoang Gap, is situated southeast of the city of Vigan, where the Quirino Bridge is now located; it serves as the natural entrance to the fertile Tineg River basin. Over time the phrase was shortened, and the area which Abra referred to expanded to include most of the upland territory drained by the Tineg River between the Malayan Range and the Cordillera Central, and inhabited by the Itneg.

Agusan (del Norte and del Sur)

- agusan, Manobo for "where the water flows," referring to the river that now bears this name.

Aklan

- akean, Akeanon for "where there is boiling or frothing," describing the water flow of the Aklan River at shallow areas near its mouth, where Kalibo is located, especially during the dry season. Aclán was the original name of Kalibo, and the river was known in early Spanish accounts as Spanish: El Río de Aclán, lit. 'The River of Aklan'. The Spanish-era territory that covered the river valley was also called Aclán but following subsequent divisions was renamed Calivo. Upon the separation of the Akeanon-speaking part of Capiz in 1956, Aclán (spelled in Filipino orthography as Aklan) was resurrected as the name for the new province, and Kalibo was named its capital.

Albay

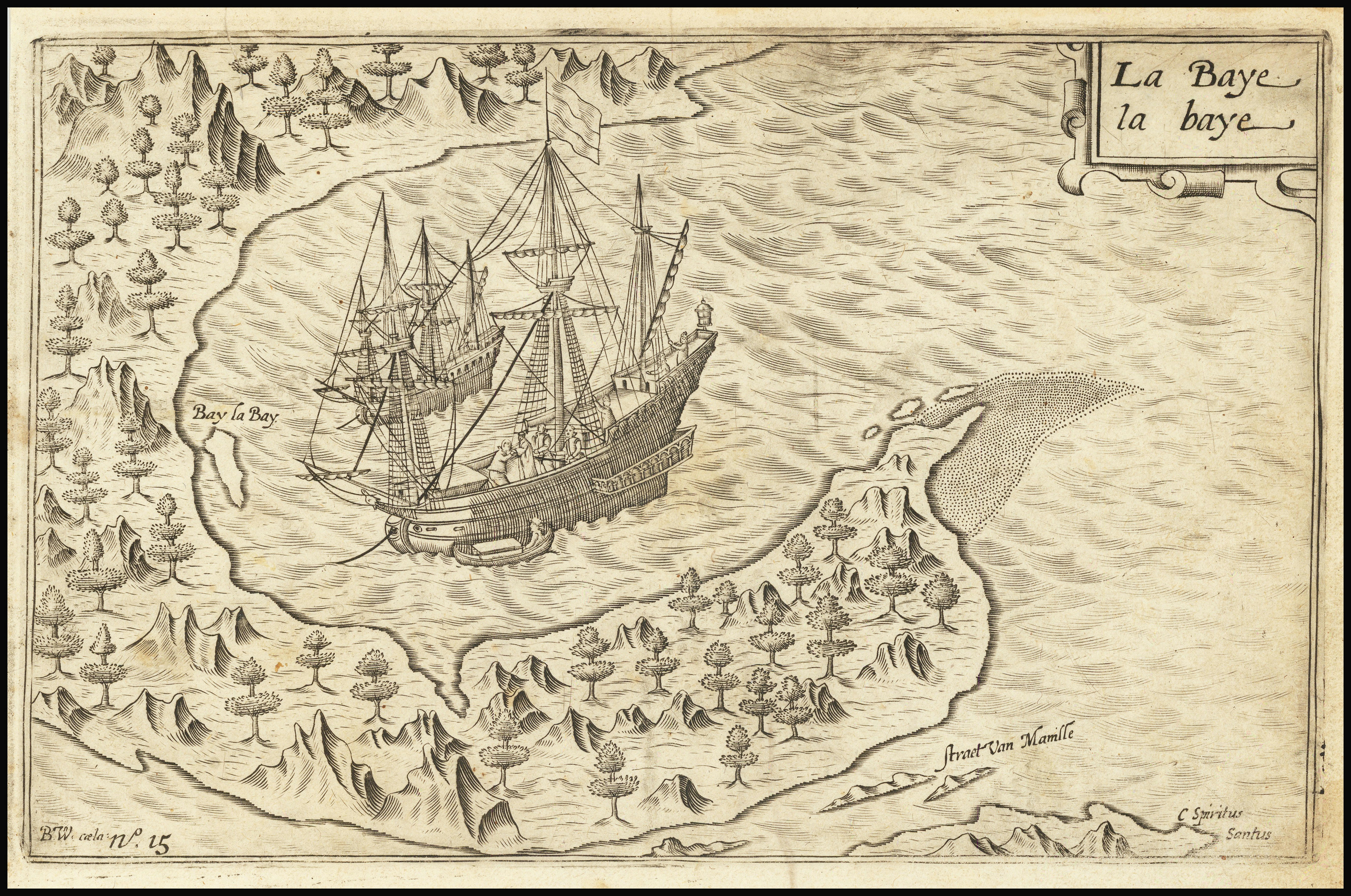
Map of La Baye la baye (Albay Gulf, by modern-day Legazpi City) (1602) by Olivier van Noort

- From Early Modern Philippine Spanish: Albay, lit. 'The Bay', composed of the Spanish article, Spanish: Al, lit. 'The', and Spanish: baye, which was an old variant spelling of Spanish: bahía, lit. 'bay (geographical feature)', referring to Albay Gulf as in longer obsolete variant names, Spanish: La Baye la baye, lit. 'The Bay of Baye' or Spanish: Bay la Bay, lit. 'Bay of Bay' as in Olivier van Noort's 1602 Map of La Baye la baye (Albay Gulf, by modern-day Legazpi City), where the first baye or bay is the old variant spelling of Spanish: bahía, lit. 'bay (geographical feature)', but the second baye or bay refers to its original derivation from Central Bikol: baybay, lit. 'shore' originally referring to the shores of Albay (now Legazpi City), where finally, it was simplified or shortened to just its present form to do away with any confusion. The name originally referred to the coastal settlement of Sawangan, now the port district of Legazpi City. In time, the name was also later applied to the province over which the town of Albay (now Legazpi City) served as the capital.

Antique

- Hispanicized form of the word hamtik, Kinaray-a for a species of large red ants abundant in the town of Hamtic (formerly rendered as Antique in Spanish), which served as the first capital of the province. As with many other provinces created during the Spanish colonial era, the name of the capital town was applied to the whole province.

Apayao

- apa'yaw, a word in various Cordilleran languages meaning "overtaking," in reference to the swift-flowing river that drains the mountainous terrain inhabited by the Isneg ethnic group. Among the Isneg, apa'yaw only refers to the main branch of the upper reaches of the Apayao-Abulug River system, and only those who live along that part of the river basin are called i-apa'yaw ("from Apa'yaw"). Apa'yaw as an appellation for the entire ethnic group is therefore an exonym; Isneg is the endonym. Apayao (with the spelling rendered in accordance with Spanish orthography) was the name given to the Isneg-majority sub-province established in 1907.

Aurora

- Spanish given name. The province was named in honor of Aurora Quezon, wife of president Manuel Quezon, who in turn was born in the town of Baler, now the province's capital; Aurora Quezon herself was also born in Baler. Aurora itself is the Latin word for "dawn," this is also a Spanish loanword from Latin itself.

Basilan

- basilan, a native word possibly meaning "waterway into the [open] sea," referring to the body of water connecting the Sulu Sea to the Moro Gulf and the Celebes Sea. The first Spanish accounts of the area call the province's main island Tagima (variously spelled Taghima, Taguina, Tagliman and Taguima), even though the strait separating this island from Mindanao was already known as Basilan. Over time, the name of the strategic waterway began to be applied to the island lying on the other side of the strait, opposite the Spanish fort at Samboangan.
- Contraction of basih balan, Bahasa Sūg for "magnetic iron," referring to the rich iron ore deposits found in the island that now bears its name, after which the province was named.

Bataan

- Evolved form of batan, a word of obscure origin, which was the indigenous name for the land across the water from Maragondon, also rendered in early Spanish accounts as Vatan. The term batang has cognates across various Austronesian languages, mostly being a word that means "the main part of something," such as "trunk" or "body" (see Batangas below). On a more abstract level, the term means "the most important or pre-eminent thing." Reflexes of batang in some Austronesian languages also lend support to the possible interpretation "land bridge," given the term's usage related to elongated, trunk-like shapes. The use of batan for the province's namesake peninsula may therefore be related either to: 1) its conspicuousness within the Manila Bay area, given the topographic prominence of its two high peaks (Mount Natib, and Mount Mariveles which dominates entrance to Manila Bay), or 2) its elongated shape and topography, which resulted from a plateau being formed between the two aforementioned volcanic peaks (see Batanes below for a similar interpretation). Another source is that bataan is the Old Kapampangan word for "mercenary."

Batanes

- Hispanicized and pluralized form of vatan, the indigenous name for the province's main island, of obscure origin, similar to the etymology of Bataan above. The term batang has cognates across various Austronesian languages, mostly being a word that means "the main part of something," such as "trunk" or "body" (see Batangas below). On a more abstract level, the term means "the most important or pre-eminent thing." Reflexes of batang in some Austronesian languages also lend support to the possible interpretation "land bridge," given the term's usage related to elongated, trunk-like shapes. The use of batan for the province's namesake island may therefore be related either to: 1) its conspicuousness within its immediate island group, given the topographic prominence of its two high peaks (Mount Iraya and Mount Matarem), or 2) its elongated shape and topography, which resulted from a plateau being formed between the two aforementioned volcanic peaks. The province and the island group was named after the pluralized version of Batan, as this island served as the political and economic center.

Batangas

- Spanish plural form of the Tagalog word batang, meaning "log," in reference to the trunks of logged trees that used to be floated down the Calumpang River which runs through the town (now city) of Batangas. Originally the name only referred to the town, but as with many other provinces created during the Spanish colonial era, the name of the capital town was applied to the whole province. Other former names of the province that reflected the location of the administrative capital include Balayan, Bombon (a settlement on the shores of what is now Taal Lake destroyed by volcanic eruption and later re-established as the town of San Nicolas), and Comintan (after the settlement of Kumintang, now part of Batangas City).

Benguet

- Hispanicized rendering of benget, Kankanaey word for "edge." This was the original name of the settlement at the edge of a swamp formed by the Balili River flooding the flat valley floor. Benget eventually lent its name to the swampy valley (which has since been converted for agricultural production and is now known as the La Trinidad Valley), as well as the Spanish-era comandancia and American-era province administered from it.

Biliran

- biliran, a Waray word meaning "edge" or "something which forms corners or tips," likely in reference to the sandy point (now called Inagawan or Banderahan) at the mouth of what is now the Caraycaray River. The settlement near this sandy point was also named Biliran, and it became the poblacion (administrative center) of the pueblo of the same name in 1712. The island from which the present-day province takes its name more prevalently began to be called Biliran following the establishment of the pueblo, replacing the old name Panamao which referred to the island's once-active main volcano. The original Biliran poblacion was a thriving shipbuilding settlement which produced galleons in the 17th century. It was decimated by Moro raids in 1754 and was abandoned; what remained of the original poblacion is now known as Sitio Ilawod in Barangay Caraycaray, Municipality of Naval. A new poblacion was eventually transferred to a hilltop location further south, in what is now Barangay Hugpa, Municipality of Biliran, sometime between 1765 and 1775; this new poblacion was also abandoned and the coastal settlement at the foot of the hill eventually became the modern-day poblacion of the municipality that retained the Biliran name.

Bohol

- Hispanicized rendering of bo-ol, the name of the site of the blood compact (sanduguan) between the native king Rajah Sikatuna and the Spanish conquistador Miguel López de Legazpi, which in turn may have been derived from the local term for a certain kind of small thorny tree. The island was named after this settlement, now a barangay in Tagbilaran City, the capital of the province; the province in turn was named after this main island.

Bukidnon

- bukidnon, Cebuano for "people of the mountain," referring to the indigenous tribes inhabiting the Central Mindanao highlands. Early Spanish accounts give the name of these tribes as Buquidnones or Monteses de Mindanao ("mountain people of Mindanao"). Bukidnon eventually became the name applied to the territory they inhabited, which became a sub-province in 1907 and a province in 1914.

Bulacan

- Journalist Robby Tantingco hypothesises that the name of the place was probably a *Hispanicized form of the word burakan, Tagalog or Kapampangan for "muddy place," referring to the marshy conditions in what is now the town of Bulakan, the former capital of the province that now bears its name.

Cagayan

- Hispanicized form of the word kagayan, a native term meaning "place near or on a river," with the root word kagay having cognates in many Austronesian languages as a term for "river," referring to the main river of northeast Luzon. Early Spanish accounts consistently call the river and the surrounding countryside Cagayan or Cagaian, thereby making the folk etymology katagayan ("place of tagay trees") erroneous.

Camarines (Norte and Sur)

- Plural form of the Spanish word camarín, the term used by the Spaniards to refer to the storage sheds (kamalig) that were abundant in the fertile and densely populated Bicol River plain in what is now Naga City and central Camarines Sur.

Camiguin

- Hispanicized corruption of the word kamanigin, a local word of obscure origin, rendered in early Spanish accounts as Camaniguin, perhaps derived from the Manobo word for "to climb" (and in extension, "high elevation,") referring to the tall mountains of the island. Another possible meaning is "showy," in recognition of the prominence of the island's tall mountains when viewed on the horizon.

Capiz

- Hispanicized form of kapid, a Capiznon term for the translucent shells that come from a species of bivalve pearl oysters, which were found in abundance in the coastal settlement that formerly bore this name, which serves as the provincial capital. Dialectal variations within the Spanish language led to the rendering of the native placename into Capiz, with the z originally pronounced as /θ/, like the th in the English word "this." The term for the pearl shells is now pronounced /kapis/ in modern Filipino as a result of pronouncing the z in "Capiz" as s; this pronunciation also pertains to the seseo in most Spanish dialects.

Catanduanes

- Hispanicized and pluralized form of katanduan, Bikol for "place abundant with tando trees," referring to the abundance of such trees in the island.

Cavite

- Hispanicized form of kawit or corruption of kalawit, Tagalog words for "hook," in reference to the small hook-shaped peninsula jutting into Manila Bay. The name originally only applied to the peninsula (Cavite La Punta, now Cavite City) and the adjacent mainland coastal area (Cavite Viejo, now Kawit). Cavite City used to serve as the capital of the province until 1954, and as with many other provinces organized during the Spanish colonial era, the name of the capital was applied to the whole province.

Cebu

- Hispanicized corruption of sugbu, Cebuano for "to walk on shallow waters," referring to the shallows through which one had to wade in order to reach dry land from the port of the city that now bears its name. Earlier Hispanicized variants of the settlement's name include Zubu and Çubu. As with many other provinces organized during the Spanish colonial era, the name of the capital was applied to the whole province.

Cotabato (and South Cotabato)

- Hispanicized form of kuta watu, Maguindanaon for "stone fort," referring to an actual stone fort that stood on Tantawan (now Pedro Colina) Hill, around which grew the settlement that eventually became the capital of the undivided province. Subsequent divisions and the creation of new provinces have resulted in both Cotabato and South Cotabato exercising jurisdiction far from their namesake city.

Davao (de Oro, del Norte, del Sur, Occidental, and Oriental)

- Hispanicized form of the Bagobo word dabo, meaning "to fall", alluding to the drop in elevation the river that now bears the name undergoes on its way from the slopes of Mount Apo to the sea. A related word in the neighboring Obo language, davoh, means "beyond the high grounds" (i.e., the lowland). The settlement at the mouth of this river was also called Dabu; a 1628 document renders the native name in Dutch orthography as Daboe. The placename was later rendered in Spanish orthography as Dávao, and this settlement lent its name to the Spanish-era military district and, later, American-era province, of which it served as the capital.
  - de oro, Spanish for "of gold," referring to abundant gold found in the province of Davao de Oro.
    - Davao de Oro was known as Compostela Valley until a plebiscite held in December 2019 renamed it. This name comes from its main topographic feature, the valley (also called the Monkayo Valley) on which the town of Compostela is located. The town's name in turn may have come from the city of Santiago de Compostela in the Galicia region of Spain, the birthplace of a Spanish friar who visited the valley.

Dinagat Islands

- dinagat, Cebuano for "of the sea," referring to the island on which most of the province is situated, or the town which was the first municipality established in the area.

Guimaras

- Hispanicized corruption of himal-us, the indigenous name for the province's main island, of unknown etymology. Early Spanish accounts render the name of the island in Spanish orthography as Ymaraes or Ymaras.

Ifugao

- Hispanicized corruption of i-pugo, Ifugao for "of the hills" or "of the earth," both referring to the ethnic group and the rice handed to them by the god Matungulan, according to myth. The province was named after the ethnic group, which comprises the majority of its population.

Ilocos (Norte and Sur)

- Hispanicized and pluralized corruption of i-lokong, Ilokano for "of the lowland," referring to the inhabitants of the narrow coastal plain along northwest coast of Luzon. This term stands in contrast to another common ethnonym, i-golot ("of the mountains"), which describes inhabitants of the highland areas of northern Luzon. Yloco was the early Hispanic rendering of this term, and in time the plural form Ylocos, later spelled as Ilocos, became prevalent.

Iloilo

- Hispanicized corruption of irong-irong, Hiligaynon for "nose-like," referring to the shape of the delta formed by what are now called the Iloilo and Salog Rivers on which the settlement of the same name thrived. The name originally only applied to the town (now city) of Iloilo (rendered in Spanish orthography as Yloylo or Yloilo), which serves as the capital of the province. As with many other provinces organized during the Spanish colonial era, the name of the capital was applied to the whole province.

Isabela

- Spanish given name. The province was named after Isabella II, the reigning queen of Spain at the time of the province's creation in 1856. "Isabela" by itself is the Spanish cognate of Elizabeth, ultimately derived from the Hebrew אֱלִישֶׁבַע Elisheva, which variously means "My God is an oath," or "My God is abundance," "God is satisfaction," or "God is perfection."

Kalinga

- kalingga, a word meaning "enemy" used by many Cagayan Valley tribes (such as the Gaddang and Ibanag) to refer to any enemy tribe. Rendered in early Spanish accounts as Calingas and in American accounts as Caylingas, the ethnonym became most associated with the people inhabiting the highlands along the Little Cagayan River (Río Chico de Cagayan). Despite being an exonym —a name given to the ethnic group by outsiders— the sub-province where they comprised the majority was named Kalinga upon its establishment in 1907. The present spelling is derived from the native word's rendering in accordance with Filipino orthography.

La Union

- la unión, Spanish for "the union," referring to the merging of towns from southern Ilocos Sur and northeastern Pangasinan that resulted in the creation of the province on March 2, 1850.

Laguna

- laguna, Spanish for "lake," or "lagoon," referring to the large body of freshwater in Laguna de Bay (Spanish: Laguna de Bay, lit. 'Lake of Bay') that was named after the province's first capital, the town of Bay (pronounced "BA‧I"). Twenty of the province's 30 towns and cities border the lake.

Lanao (del Norte and del Sur)

- Hispanicized form of ranaw, Maranao for "lake," referring to the lake which lies in the center of the plateau that comprised most of the territory of the old province of Lanao.

Leyte (and Southern Leyte)

- Hispanicized corruption of the Waray phrase hira Iti / Ete ("belonging to Iti / Ete"), or hi Rayti / Rayte ("it is Rayti / Rayte"), referring to the rulership of an individual named either "Iti"/"Ete" or "Rayti"/"Rayte" over what used to be among the most significant settlements along the island's northern coast, where a large river emptied into a small bay. The town's name was recorded in an early Spanish account by Jesuit priest Juan Jose Delgado as Hiraete or Hiraite. Other names of Leyte Island in earlier Spanish accounts include Tandaya (after the powerful chieftain who ruled a significant portion of the island) and Abuyo (after the first significant settlement encountered by the Spaniards during the early days of exploration).

Maguindanao (del Norte and del Sur)

- Hispanicized rendering of magindanaw, Maguindanaon for "that which has suffered inundation," referring to the flood plains of central Mindanao that are seasonally inundated by the Mindanao River, where much of the province's territory is located.

Marinduque

- Hispanicized corruption of malindig or malindug, Tagalog for "tall and elegant," referring to the tallest peak in the island. Other Hispanicized variants of the name include Malindic, Malinduc and Marinduc.

Masbate

- Some early accounts record the name of the province's main island as Masbat. This may be based on masibát, a native word for "abundant with lances," perhaps in reference to the island's well-armed inhabitants; or on masabat, Bikol for "to meet along the way," alluding to the strategic position of the town (now city) that bears the name, as well as the island named after it, within old Philippine maritime trade routes.
- Other early accounts record the name of the island as Masbad, which may be based on masibad. In Bikol, this word means "to pass through from end to end," thereby alluding to the island's elongated shape; in Waray, this word means "devourer," alluding to the island's once crocodile-infested rivers.

Mindoro (Occidental and Oriental)

- Hispanicized form of minolo or mintolo, local words of now-unrecognizable meaning, referring to the name of Mindoro Island's principal trading town during the early Spanish colonial period. The term minolo may possibly be related to minuro, an old Hiligaynon term meaning "settlement" or "where there is an abundance" (from the root word duro, meaning "plenty" or "abundance"). Minolo was located on the northern coast of the island, facing Luzon, and is presently a sitio in the municipality of Puerto Galera, which formerly served as the capital of Mindoro Province. Documents written in Tagalog as late as the 18th century still referred to the island as Minolo. One popular (but erroneous) origin of the name, mina de oro (Spanish for "gold mine"), was the result of the Spaniards giving meaning to a phrase that they could recognize, despite the fact that no major gold-mining industry existed or exists in the island.

Misamis (Occidental and Oriental)

- The undivided province of Misamis was named after its former capital, the town of Misamis (now Ozamiz City). The word misamis itself is of obscure origin, but originally only referred to the strategic piece of flat land (Misamis Point) guarding the entrance into Panguil Bay on which the Spanish military established a stone fort called the Fuerte de la Concepcion y del Triunfo in 1756. The settlement which grew around the fort also took the name Misamis. When the Spanish-era military district that covered the Christianized northern shores of Mindanao Island was created in the 18th century, it was administered initially from this town, and the district was therefore also named Misamis, even after the capital was transferred later to the more centrally located Cagayan.
- Folk etymologies explaining the origin of the name include: misa-misa, a phrase that the natives used in the early days of Christianization of the northern coast of Mindanao to welcome priests that visited the area to celebrate mass; and kuyamis, Subanon for a variety of sweet coconut that used to be the food staple of the natives.

Mountain Province

- From the English word mountain. The name "Mountain Province" was first used in the American period to refer to the large mountainous area in the northern Luzon highlands which also included the present-day provinces of Apayao, Benguet, Ifugao and Kalinga. The sub-province of Bontoc (which also means "mountain" in the Bontoc language) retained the name "Mountain Province" after it was elevated to the status of a full-fledged province in 1966.

Negros (Occidental and Oriental)

- negros, Spanish for "blacks," referring to the dark-skinned Negritos that inhabited the island which was then known as Buglas.

Nueva Ecija

- nueva Écija, Spanish for "new Écija", in honor of the hometown of province's first Spanish governor (Gov. Acuyar) in Andalusia, Spain. The current pronunciation of the province's name in both English and Filipino is different from the Spanish original, in that the emphasis is placed on the second syllable ("e-SI-ha") and not on the first ("E-si-ha").

Nueva Vizcaya

- nueva Vizcaya, Spanish for "new Biscay", in honor of the province in the Basque Country of Spain, the hometown of the Spanish governor-general Luis Lardizábal.

Palawan

- Palawano form of perawan, Malay for "virgin land," in reference to the largely untouched resources of the main island that now bears its name. In the Spanish colonial era the name of the island and the province was rendered in Spanish orthography as Paragua which has been erroneously etymologized as meaning "umbrella" or "sweet water" in Spanish.

Pampanga

- Hispanicized form of pampang or pangpang, Kapampangan for "river bank," referring to the densely populated area on the northern shores of Manila Bay, the settlements of which stood on the banks of the delta of what is now called the Pampanga River.

Pangasinan

- Hispanicized form of pang-asinan, Pangasinan for "salt-making place", referring to the coastal region of the Agno River basin (the present-day area of Lingayen) which had an extensively thriving salt-making industry, even in pre-colonial times.

Quezon

- Mestizo de Sangley Chinese surname originally from a Spanish-era romanization of Hokkien Chinese, possibly from the Hokkien word, Chinese: 雞孫; Pe̍h-ōe-jī: ke-sun / koe-sun, with Chinese: 雞; Pe̍h-ōe-jī: ke meaning "outer city" or "strongest" and Chinese: 孫; Pe̍h-ōe-jī: sun meaning "grandson". The province, formerly known as Tayabas (after its old capital town), was renamed in 1946 in honor of Manuel Quezon, former president (1935–1944), who was born in the town of Baler, which at the time of renaming was still part of the province. That town is now the capital of the province of Aurora, formerly a sub-province of Quezon, but became a separate province in 1979. The pronunciation of both the former president's and the province's current name in Spanish, English and Filipino places the emphasis on the first syllable ("KE-son") and not on the last ("ke-SON"), which the erroneous Spanish spelling variant Quezón suggests.

Quirino

- Spanish surname. The province was named after Elpidio Quirino, former president (1948–1953). The name "Quirino" itself was ultimately derived from the Latin Quirinus, meaning "armed with a lance."

Rizal

- Spanish surname. The province was named after José Rizal, inspirational figure of the Philippine Revolution and national hero. "Rizal" in turn, is a modified form of the Spanish word ricial, literally meaning "able to grow back when cut". Rizal was added to the family name by José Rizal's father, Francisco Mercado, upon moving from Biñan to Calamba, although his application to have the name legally recognized was denied by the authorities.

Romblon

- Early Spanish accounts rendered the toponym as Donblon in Spanish orthography, which is probably based on the native word lomlom, a term with cognates across many Philippine languages meaning "dark," or "shady," perhaps in reference to the once-thick forests of, or the clouds that constantly form over, the island that now bears the name, which in turn, is home to the capital town after which the province was named. The present form of the name is the Hispanicized corruption of this word.

Samar (Eastern, Northern and Western)

- Hispanicized form of samal, (rendered in early Spanish accounts as Zamal) an indigenous term formerly used to refer to the people that inhabited the island. The name originally applied to the more populous western region of the island, but was eventually applied to the whole island and the military province that was established in 1841. Samal is a cognate of the Malay word samar which means "disguised," "dim," "vague," or "obscure."

Sarangani

- Evolved and Hispanicized version of the Sangir word sarangan, meaning "place of swallows" referring to a specific rocky point on the west coast of the island that now bears this name, which itself was formerly called Balut Pequeño (Little Balut) Island. The use of the name progressively expanded to refer to the entire island, then its island group (coextensive with the present-day municipality of Sarangani, Davao Occidental), and then the body of water (Sarangani Strait) that separates the island group from mainland Mindanao Island. Eventually, the arm of the Celebes Sea that protrudes into southern Mindanao, lying to the northwest of the Sarangani island group, was also given this name. This body of water (Sarangani Bay) is what lends its name to the province, which forms the bay's eastern and western shores. Early Spanish accounts give the name of the island as Sarangã or Sarragán.

(Zamboanga) Sibugay

- sibugay, old Visayan term meaning "where there is sandy soil," from the root word bugay which means "sandy soil" or "loose earth." This is perhaps in reference to the shallows at the mouth of the river that now bears the name, which is known to run nearly dry during low tide. The name — variously rendered in Spanish accounts as Sibuguei, Sibuguey and Sibuguy — was also eventually applied to the fertile lands drained by the river, the bay to which the river empties, and the lands surrounding the bay. The province takes the second part of its name from this historic designation, but spelled in a manner reflecting the native pronunciation of the word.

Siquijor

- Hispanicized form of the phrase si kihod, old Visayan for "where the tide is ebbing," the toponym for a settlement (now the provincial capital) on the north side of the island known in early Spanish accounts as Isla de Fuegos ("Island of Fires"). Siquijor eventually replaced Isla de Fuegos as the name of the island.

Sorsogon

- Hispanicized form of sogsogon, Bikol adjective meaning "wadeable," derived from the root word sogsog, which means "to wade" or "to ford"; a wadeable river, for example, is known as salog na sogsogon. The toponym originally referred to the settlement on the banks of the Salog River, which became the capital of the province upon its establishment in 1767.

Sultan Kudarat

- Arabic title with regnant name. The province was named after Sultan Muhammad Dipatuan Kudarat, also known in early Spanish accounts as El Sultan Cachil Corralat, a former sultan of Maguindanao. "Kudarat" in turn, is ultimately derived from the Arabic word qudrat, meaning "power" or "might." The present spelling is derived from the rendering of the name in accordance with Filipino orthography.

Sulu

- Contraction of sulug or suluk, Bahasa Sug for "ocean current," is the home island and the historical and cultural center of the Tau Sug ("people of the current"). The Hispanicized form Jolo (now pronounced [xoˈlo] [In many dialects, the initial sound is glottal or aspirated, yielding [hoˈlo].]) is approximate to sulu if the old pronunciation of the letter 'j' in Spanish orthography, [ʃoˈlo], is taken into account. This occurs in other Spanish loanwords: jabón ("soap") entered the Filipino vocabulary as sabon and reloj ("watch") as relos. The term Sulu has also been applied to the historical sultanate that was centered in the province, as well as the archipelago and the sea over which the sultanate formerly held sway.

Surigao (del Norte and del Sur)

- Hispanicized corruption of suligaw, a Mandaya term which refers to the Surigao River that empties at the northern tip of the island of Mindanao, derived from the root word sulig, meaning "spring." Early historical accounts record the name of the river as Suligao, Surigao and Zurigan. The settlement at the mouth of the river was also named Surigao; as with common practice of the time, the town lent its name to the larger territorial divisions — including the Spanish-era military district (1870) and the American-era province (1901) — which were administered from this thriving settlement. Another possibility is that it is derived from Visayan surogao or suyogao, meaning "water current". From suyog (also sulog or surog), "current"; cf. Sinulog, Sulu, and Tausug (Suluk).

Tarlac

- Hispanicized rendering of tarlak, Aeta term for a certain grass related to talahib (cogon) and tanglar (Zambal for lemongrass). The area around the current capital city (after which the province was named) was described as matarlak, an adjective meaning "abundant with tarlak grass."

Tawi-Tawi

- Sinama form of jawi-jawi, Malay for "banyan tree," in reference to its abundance in the province's heavily forested main island. Early Spanish accounts give the name of the island as Tauitaui, Tavi-Tavi or Tavitavi.

Zambales

- Hispanicized plural form of sambalí or sambal, the name for the people who used to form the dominant ethnic group in the west-central coast of Luzon. The ethnonym, recorded in early Spanish accounts as los Çambales, was eventually applied to the land they occupy, and the mountain range that separates them from the Central Luzon plain. The first term is possibly derived from the native word for "a group of houses" (with the root word balí meaning "house"), while the second term is an old Tagalog word for a "crossing or conjunction of rivers."

Zamboanga (del Norte, del Sur and Sibugay)

- Hispanicized form of samboangan, Sinama for "anchorage," or literally, "place of mooring poles," referring to the settlement and port town at the southern tip of Mindanao's western peninsula. Just like the practice in naming many other provinces, the undivided province of Zamboanga was named after its capital.

== See also ==
- List of Philippine city name etymologies
