= List of Philippine city name etymologies =

The more than 140 cities in the Philippines as of 2022 have taken their names from a variety of languages both indigenous (Austronesian) and foreign (mostly Spanish). The majority of Philippine cities derive their names from the major regional languages where they are spoken including Tagalog, Cebuano, Ilocano, Hiligaynon, Bicolano, Kapampangan and Pangasinense. They are written using Spanish orthography in most cases, but a few have also retained their indigenous spellings. The names of thirty-nine cities derive exclusively from the Spanish language while at least three have taken their names from the old Sanskrit language.

Of the 149 cities, sixteen are named in honor of an individual while twelve are named after saints.

== City names ==
City name	Province	Name origin
Alaminos	Pangasinan	Juan Alaminos y Vivar, Spanish Governor-General of the Philippines.
Angeles	none	a contraction of its original Spanish name El Pueblo de los Ángeles which means "The Town of Angels."
Antipolo	Rizal	named after the tipulo (Philippine Spanish: antipolo), Artocarpus blancoi, a tree with edible fruits related to the breadfruit and the breadnut
Bacolod	none	Hispanicized form of bakolod, an old Hiligaynon word for "hill" in reference to the hilly area in the city that is now the barangay of Granada.
Bacoor	Cavite	named after Bacoor Bay, originally from the Philippine Negrito languages, meaning "circle", referring to the shape of the bay. Another possible origin of the name of Bacoor is from Tagalog bakood for "highlands" or "plateau" (cf. Bacolor and Bacolod).
Bago	Negros Occidental	from bago-bago, a local shrub.
Baguio	none	Hispanicized corruption of the Ibaloi word bagiw which means "moss."
Bais	Negros Oriental	Cebuano for "large, edible fresh-water eel."
Balanga	Bataan	Pampango for "clay pot."
Baliwag	Bulacan	Old Kapampangan word for "untouched."
Batac	Ilocos Norte	Unknown. Folk etymology attributes the name to batak, an Ilocano word which means "pull".
Batangas	Batangas	from batang, Tagalog for "log", in reference to the trunks of logged trees that used to be floated down the Calumpang River which runs through the city.
Bayawan	Negros Oriental	from bayaw, a Cebuano word which means "to hoist" or "to elevate."
Baybay	Leyte	Cebuano word for "shore."
Bayugan	Agusan del Sur	Manobo word for "pathway" or from bayug, the local name for bayur tree.
Biñan	Laguna	Hispanicized corruption of binyagan, Tagalog for "baptismal place."
Bislig	Surigao del Sur	from bizlin, an ancient gold currency.
Bogo	Cebu	from bogo, an incense tree.
Borongan	Eastern Samar	from borong, a Waray word for "fog", referring to the heavy fog that once covered the place.
Butuan	none	from batuan, a Visayan sour fruit.
Cabadbaran	Agusan del Norte	from badbad, a Cebuano word which means "to untie."
Cabanatuan	Nueva Ecija	from banatu, a sturdy vine that grew along the swampy banks of Rio Grande de Pampanga.
Cabuyao	Laguna	from cabuyao, common name for Citrus macroptera, a species of wild orange
Cadiz	Negros Occidental	the Spanish city of Cádiz.
Cagayan de Oro	none	Cagayan, the Philippine province in northern Luzon, and the Spanish phrase de oro which means "of gold."
Calaca	Batangas	from kalaka, a type of indigenous roofing made up of halved bamboo poles linked and arranged alternately facing up and facing down
Calamba	Laguna	Hispanicized from Tagalog kalamba, meaning a wide-mouthed earthen water jar (also called balanga or banga).
Calapan	Mindoro Oriental	Hispanicized form of the old Tagalog word kalapang which means "branch."
Calbayog	Samar	from bayog, a Visayan name for the Pterospermum diversifolium tree that grew in abundance in the city.
Caloocan	none	Hispanicized form of the Tagalog root word lo-ok; kalook-lookan (or kaloob-looban) which means "innermost area."
Candon	Ilocos Sur	Unknown. Probably named after the Spanish municipality of Candón in Huelva, Andalucia; or from a Hispanicization of Ilocano kandong (Cyrtophyllum fragrans), a species of tree with very hard wood
Canlaon	Negros Oriental	Kanlaon Volcano.
Carcar	Cebu	the Spanish municipality of Cárcar.
Carmona	Cavite	the Spanish municipality of Carmona.
Catbalogan	Samar	from balaug, a type of shrub that used to thrive along the seashore and mouth of the Antiao River.
Cauayan	Isabela	Hispanicized form of kawayan, Tagalog for "bamboo."
Cavite City	Cavite	Hispanicized form of kawit or corruption of kalawit, Tagalog words for "hook", in reference to the small hook-shaped peninsula jutting into Manila Bay.
Cebu City	none	Hispanicized corruption of sugbu, Cebuano for "to walk on shallow waters", referring to the shallows through which one had to wade in order to reach dry land from the port of the city.
Cotabato City	none	Hispanicized form of kuta wato, Maguindanao (from Malay "Kota Batu") for "stone fort."
Dagupan	none	from pandaragupan, a Pangasinense word which means "gathering place", due to the city's history as a market town.
Danao	Cebu	Hispanicized form of danawan, a Cebuano word for "small lake."
Dapitan	Zamboanga del Norte	from dapit, Cebuano for "to invite."
Dasmariñas	Cavite	Gómez Pérez Dasmariñas, the seventh Spanish Governor-General of the Philippines.
Davao City	none	Hispanicized form of dawaw, a Guiangan name for the Davao River.
Digos	Davao del Sur	Hispanicized corruption of padigus, a Lumad word which means "to take a bath" in reference to the Digos River.
Dipolog	Zamboanga del Norte	from dipag, Subanon for "across the river."
Dumaguete	Negros Oriental	from dagit, a Cebuano word which means "to snatch", in reference to the frequent marauding attacks of pirates in the past
El Salvador	Misamis Oriental	Spanish for "The Saviour."
Escalante	Negros Occidental	the Spanish municipality of Escalante.
Gapan	Nueva Ecija	from gapang, a Tagalog word which means "crawl."
General Santos	none	Paulino Santos, Filipino Commanding General of the Philippine Army.
General Trias	Cavite	Mariano Trías, Filipino revolutionary and politician.
Gingoog	Misamis Oriental	Hispanicized form of hingoog, a Manobo word which means "good luck."
Guihulngan	Negros Oriental	from guihulugan, Cebuano for "a place where something was dropped."
Himamaylan	Negros Occidental	derived from Mamaylan, one of the ancient pre-colonial names of Negros Island by Cebuano-speaking Visayans.
Ilagan	none	According to Fr. Julian Malumbres, Ilagan derived its name from the word laga, an Ibanag word for "smallpox", of which there was an outbreak during the town's founding in 1686.
Iligan	none	Higaonon for "fortress".
Iloilo City	none	Hispanicized corruption of irong-irong, Hiligaynon for "nose-like", referring to the shape of the delta formed by what are now the Iloilo and Salog Rivers.
Imus	Cavite	Old Tagalog word for "a piece of land cutting into the junction of two rivers."
Iriga	Camarines Sur	from i raga, a Bicolano phrase which means "there is land."
Isabela	Basilan	Isabella II, Queen of Spain.
Kabankalan	Negros Occidental	from bangkal, a Philippine Leichhard tree.
Kidapawan	Cotabato	from tida pawan, a Manobo phrase which means "highland spring".
Koronadal	South Cotabato	from koron nadal, a B'laan phrase which means "grass plain."
La Carlota	Negros Occidental	the Spanish municipality of La Carlota.
Lamitan	Basilan	from lami-lamihan, a Yakan word which means "merry-making."
Laoag	Ilocos Norte	Ilocano for "light or clarity."
Lapu-Lapu	none	Lapulapu, the ancient ruler of Mactan.
Las Piñas	none	Spanish for "The Pineapples"; the city's old name however is "Las Peñas" meaning "The Rocks".
Legazpi	Albay	Miguel López de Legazpi, the first Spanish Governor-General of the Philippines.
Ligao	Albay	from ticao, a Bicolano word for a tree with poisonous leaves.
Lipa	Batangas	from lipa, a Philippine linden tree.
Lucena	none	The Spanish municipality of Lucena.
Maasin	Southern Leyte	Cebuano for "salty."
Mabalacat	Pampanga	from balakat, a species of tree endemic to the Philippines.
Makati	none	from kumakati, Tagalog for "ebbing tide"; shortened and Filipinized form of its original Spanish name "San Pedro de Macati."
Malabon	none	from Tagalog malabon, meaning "having many silt deposits". The name was previously also used for two other places in Cavite during the early Spanish colonial period: Santa Cruz de Malabon (now Tanza) and San Francisco de Malabon (now General Trias).
Malaybalay	Bukidnon	named after a spring of the same name along the Sawaga River
Malolos	Bulacan	from paluslos, a Kapampangan word which means "downstream" in relation to the Calumpit River.
Mandaluyong	none	from daluyong, Tagalog for "big waves from the sea"; the city's original name was San Felipe Neri.
Mandaue	Cebu	Hispanicized form of mantawi, a Cebuano variety of vine.
Manila	none	Hispanicized corruption of the Tagalog-Sanskrit phrase may nila which means "there is nila" (indigo tree in Sanskrit) referring to the prevalence of the tree.
Marawi	Lanao del Sur	from rawi, a Maranao word which means "reclining" in reference to the lilies that bend northward on the banks of the mouth of the Agus River.
Marikina	none	Félix Berenguer de Marquina, the Spanish Governor-General of the Philippines.
Masbate	Masbate	Hispanicized corruption of masabat, Bicolano for "to meet along the way", referring to the strategic position of the city within Philippine maritime trade routes.
Mati	Davao Oriental	from maa-ti, a Mandaya word which means to "dry quickly", referring to the Mati Creek which dries up quickly even after a heavy rain.
Meycauayan	Bulacan	Hispanicized form of the Tagalog phrase may kawayan meaning "a place full of bamboos."
Muntinlupa	none	Hispanization of Tagalog muntíng lupà, literally meaning "small land" or alternatively, "little soil".
Muñoz	Nueva Ecija	Francisco Muñoz, Spanish politician and former gobernadorcillo of Nueva Ecija.
Naga	Camarines Sur	Bicolano for narra, a type of rosewood tree.
Naga	Cebu	Cebuano for the narra tree.
Navotas	none	Hispanicized form of the Tagalog word nabutas which means "breached" or "pierced through" in reference to the formation of the Navotas River.
Olongapo	none	Hispanicized corruption of olo nin apo, a Zambal phrase which means "head of the elder."
Ormoc	none	Hispanicized corruption of ogmok, a Cebuano word which means "lowland" or "plain."
Oroquieta	Misamis Occidental	the settlement of Oroquieta (Orokieta) in Navarra, Spain
Ozamiz	Misamis Occidental	José Ozámiz, a Filipino politician from Mindanao.
Pagadian	Zamboanga del Sur	from padian, an Iranun word for "market."
Palayan	Nueva Ecija	Tagalog for "rice field."
Panabo	Davao del Norte	from taboan, a Cebuano word which means "marketplace."
Parañaque	none	Hispanicized corruption of Palanyag, the old Tagalog name of the Parañaque River.
Pasay	none	Dayang-dayang Pasay, a Namayan princess. The city's old name was Pineda, after Spanish horticulturist Cornelio Pineda.
Pasig	none	an archaic Tagalog word referring to the shore. Compare "dalampasigan", "pasigan", or Malay "pasir" ("sand")
Passi	Iloilo	from passis, a Kinaray-a word which means "unhusked rice."
Puerto Princesa	none	a contraction of its original Spanish name Puerto de la Princesa which means "Port of the Princess" named after Princess Eulalia of Spain.
Quezon City	none	Manuel Luis Quezon, the second president of the Philippines.
Roxas	Capiz	Manuel Acuña Roxas, the fifth president of the Philippines.
Sagay	Negros Occidental	from sigay, a Hiligaynon word for "shell."
Samal	Davao del Norte	Sama, an indigenous ethnic group in Mindanao.
San Carlos	Negros Occidental	Saint Charles Borromeo.
San Carlos	Pangasinan	named after Charles III of Spain, who ordered Spanish forces to raze the town of Binalatongan (its former name) to the ground.
San Fernando	La Union	Saint Ferdinand, King of Spain.
San Fernando	Pampanga	Saint Ferdinand, King of Spain.
San Jose	Nueva Ecija	Saint Joseph
San Jose del Monte	Bulacan	Saint Joseph of the Mountain.
San Juan	none	Saint John the Baptist; the city's longer official name is San Juan del Monte, Spanish for "Saint John of the Mountain."
San Pablo	Laguna	Saint Paul the First Hermit.
San Pedro	Laguna	Saint Peter, the Apostle
Santa Rosa	Laguna	Saint Rose of Lima.
Santiago	none	Saint James the Apostle.
Santo Tomas	Batangas	Saint Thomas Aquinas
Silay	Negros Occidental	from kansilay, a local Philippine tree.
Sipalay	Negros Occidental	Suludnon for "there is rice"
Sorsogon City	Sorsogon	Hispanicized form of sogsogon, a Bicolano verb meaning "to continuously follow a course, such as a trail or a river."
Surigao	Surigao del Norte	Hispanicization of Suligaw (historically also rendered as "Suligao" or "Zurigan"), the native name for the Surigao River
Tabaco	Albay	from tabak ko, Bikol for "my bolo"
Tabuk	Kalinga	from tobog, Ilocano for "living stream."
Tacloban	none	Hispanicized corruption of tarakluban, a Waray-Waray word which means "to catch fish."
Tacurong	Sultan Kudarat	Hispanicized corruption of talakudong, a Maguindanao word which means a traditional head covering (also known as salakot)
Tagaytay	Cavite	Tagalog for "ridge".
Tagbilaran	Bohol	from tagubilaan, a Boholano phrase which means "to hide from the Moro pirates."
Taguig	none	Hispanicized form of the Tagalog word taga-giik meaning "rice thresher."
Tagum	Davao del Norte	from magugpo, a Mandaya word which means "tall tree."
Talisay	Cebu	from talisay, the Visayan common name for the native beach almond tree
Talisay	Negros Occidental	from talisay, the Visayan common name for the native beach almond tree
Tanauan	Batangas	Hispanicized form of the Tagalog word tanawan which means "vista" or "view."
Tandag	Surigao del Sur	from tangad, Cebuano for lemongrass.
Tangub	Misamis Occidental	from tangkob, a Subanon word which means "rice basket."
Tanjay	Negros Oriental	Hispanicized corruption of taytay, a Cebuano word which means "bamboo bridge."
Tarlac City	Tarlac	Hispanicized rendering of tarlak, Aeta term for a certain grass related to talahib (cogon) and tanglar (Zambal for lemongrass).
Tayabas	Quezon	from bayabas, a Tagalog word for the "guava" fruit.
Toledo	Cebu	the Spanish city of Toledo.
Trece Martires	Cavite	Spanish for "thirteen martyrs." The city was named in honor of the Thirteen Martyrs of Cavite.
Tuguegarao	Cagayan	Hispanicized form of the Ibanag phrase tuggui gari yaw meaning "this used to be fire."
Urdaneta	Pangasinan	Andrés de Urdaneta, Spanish friar, circumnavigator and explorer.
Valencia	Bukidnon	Named by the first local Barrio school teacher in the village, who hailed from Valencia, Bohol.
Valenzuela	none	Pío Valenzuela, a Filipino patriot.
Victorias	Negros Occidental	from Nuestra Señora de las Victorias, Spanish for "Our Lady of Victories".
Vigan	Ilocos Sur	from Ilocano bigàan (or kabigàan), literally "the place where bíga (Alocasia macrorrhizos) abounds"
Zamboanga City	Zamboanga del Sur	Hispanicized form of samboangan, Sinama for "anchorage", or literally, "place of mooring poles", referring to the settlement and port town at the southern tip of Mindanao's western peninsula.

== See also ==
- List of Philippine provincial name etymologies
