= Agusan Marsh Wildlife Sanctuary =

Wildlife reserve in Agusan del Sur, Philippines

- IUCN category IV (habitat/species management area)
- Location within Philippines Location within Mindanao mainland
- Location: Agusan del Sur, Philippines
- Nearest city: Bislig
- Coordinates: 8°19′0″N 125°52′0″E
- Area: 14,835.99 hectares (36,660.5 acres)
- Established: October 31, 1996
- Governing body: Department of Environment and Natural Resources

Ramsar Wetland
- Designated: November 12, 1999
- Reference no.: 1009

The Agusan Marsh Wildlife Sanctuary is a protected area in Agusan del Sur, Philippines declared by President Fidel V. Ramos. The marshland acts like a sponge, as it is nestled in the midwaters of the Agusan River drainage basin. Within its lakes, several floating communities can be found. The sanctuary was home to the 20.24 feet (6.17 m) saltwater crocodile Lolong, the world's largest captive crocodile.

It is located in the municipalities of Bunawan, La Paz, Loreto, Rosario, San Francisco, and Talacogon in the province of Agusan del Sur. The marsh was declared a Ramsar Site No. 1009 on November 12, 1999. It was also recognized as an ASEAN Heritage Park (AHP) Site No. 42 on November 8, 2018. The site was also included in the tentative list of UNESCO on March 11, 2024, and is currently being evaluated.

Agusan Marsh Wildlife Sanctuary was declared a national park under Republic Act No. 11038 (Expanded National Integrated Protected Areas System Act of 2018) signed by President Rodrigo Duterte in July 2018.

== Description ==
Agusan Marsh is one of the most ecologically significant wetlands in the Philippines. Found in the heart of Mindanao's Agusan Basin, this vast expanse of marsh covers an area roughly the size of Metro Manila. It contains nearly 15% of the nation's freshwater resources in the form of swamp forests.

Agusan Marsh is also host to "Wonderland", where you can see natural "bonsai" trees crafted by nature. It can be reached from Barangay Caimpogan or from Barangay New Visayas in the municipality of San Francisco.

The tiny community of mostly ethnic Manobos have made their permanent homes deep within the marsh, living on floating homes. The small houses, made of bamboo and nipa lashed to hardwood logs, freely rise or fall with the level of the marsh itself. The marsh provides virtually everything the Manobos need.

=== Wildlife ===
During the rainy season, when the water rises to create large lakes, vast number of ducks come to Agusan Marsh to nest. In the dry months, thousands of birds come from as faraway as Japan, China and Russia to escape the chilly winter winds of Northern Asia. Over 200 individual species have been known to spend at least part of the year in the marsh, making it one of Asia's most important transit points for wild birds. The marsh has been designated an Important Bird Area (IBA) by BirdLife International because it supports significant populations of Philippine ducks, spotted imperial-pigeons, sarus cranes, purple herons, Pinsker's hawk-eagles, southern silvery and rufous-lored kingfishers, and celestial monarchs.

In the very heart of the marsh is a semi-permanent lake where many square kilometres of lily pads, hyacinths and other hydrophytic plants spread out like an enormous green quilt. In the dark tea-coloured waters live untold numbers of catfish, carp, soft-shell freshwater turtles, and crocodiles.

== See also ==
- List of protected areas in the Philippines
