= Agusan (province) =

Former province of the Philippines

- Province of the Philippines
- 1907-1967
- Location of the historical province of Agusan.
- Capital: Butuan
- History
  - Established: August 20 1907
  - Placed under Department of Mindanao and Sulu: December 20, 1913
  - Bukidnon sub-province separated from Agusan: September 1, 1914
  - Disestablished: November 14 1967
- Political subdivisions: 2 Sub-provinces (1907-1914); Bukidnon; Butuan
Preceded by
Misamis
Surigao
Succeeded by
Bukidnon
Agusan del Norte
Agusan del Sur
- Today part of: · Agusan del Norte · Agusan del Sur · Bukidnon

Agusan was a province of the Philippines. It existed from 1907 to 1967, when it was divided into the present-day provinces of Agusan del Norte and Agusan del Sur.

== History ==
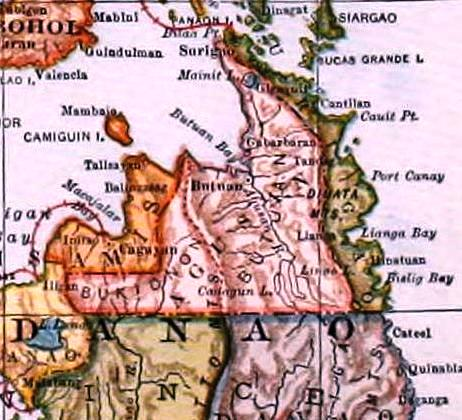
Map of Agusan in 1907

Prior to its creation as an independent province, Agusan was divided between the provinces/districts of Misamis, and Surigao during the Spanish colonial period. On August 20, 1907, Agusan was separated from Misamis and Surigao, composed of the sub-provinces of Bukidnon and Butuan, by virtue of Act No. 1693. The law became effective when the province's first governor was appointed.

The sub-province of Bukidnon became an independent province on July 23, 1914 through Act No. 2408 and Butuan sub-province assumed the name of Agusan. Both Agusan and Bukidnon were put under the Department of Mindanao and Sulu from 1913 to 1920.

During World War II and the Japanese occupation of the Philippines in 1942, Japanese forces landed in Agusan and occupied the area until they were defeated by combined American and Philippine Commonwealth troops, along with recognized guerrilla units, in 1945. Filipino soldiers from several infantry divisions of the Philippine Commonwealth Army and the Philippine Constabulary played key roles in liberating Agusan from Japanese control. A unit of the joint Philippine-American defense force was stationed at Manot, Talacogon, in the interior of the Agusan Valley, to engage in military operations against the occupying forces.

On June 17, 1967, Agusan was dissolved and was split into the two provinces of Agusan del Norte, and Agusan del Sur, through Republic Act No. 4979. The law was ratified through a plebiscite held on November 14, 1967, dissolving the old province.

== Geography ==
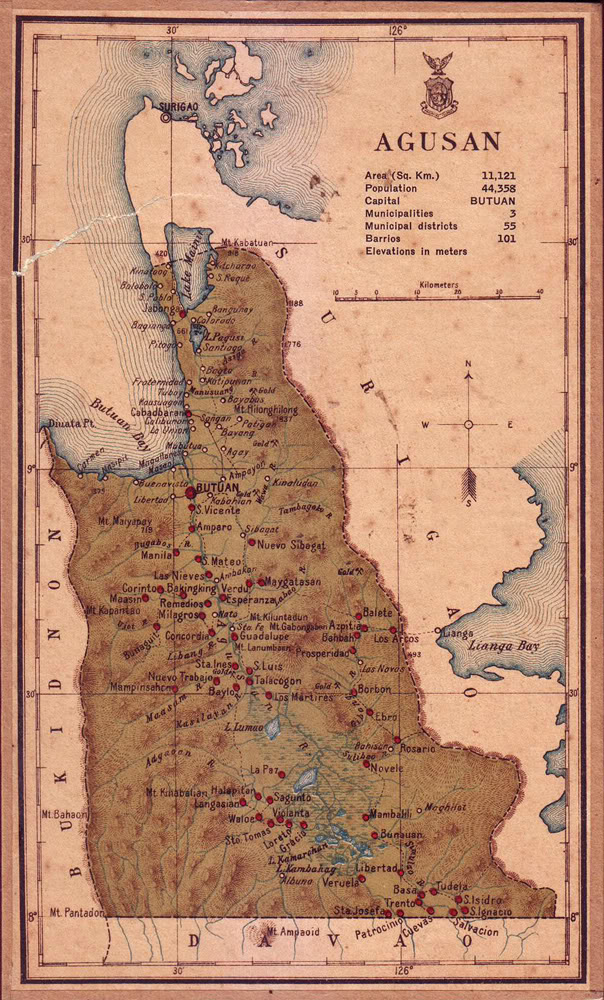
Map of Agusan in 1918

Agusan was located on the northeast portion of Mindanao island. By the time of its dissolution in 1967, Agusan comprised 18 municipalities and 1 city:

- Bayugan
- Buenavista
- Bunawan
- Butuan (capital city)
- Cabadbaran
- Carmen
- Esperanza
- Jabonga
- Kitcharao
- La Paz
- Las Nieves
- Loreto
- Nasipit
- Prosperidad
- San Francisco
- Santa Josefa
- Talacogon
- Tubay
- Veruela

== Government ==
The Agusan Provincial Capitol in Butuan served as the final provincial seat of government for Agusan. It later became the seat for Agusan del Norte.

Agusan's provincial government was last headed by the governor.

Agusan was initially under the Bureau of Non-Christian Tribes and unrepresented in the Philippine Assembly that existed until 1916. In 1913, it was placed under the Department of Mindanao and Sulu, with its legislative representative appointed by the Governor-General. It was later represented in national legislatures through the 12th senatorial district from 1916 to 1935 and the province's at-large congressional district beginning in 1935.

=== List of governors of Agusan ===
No.	Term	Portrait	Name	Remarks
	1913		Frank W. Carpenter	First civil governor of Department of Mindanao and Sulu, which encompassed Agusan
1	1914–1921		Teofisto Guingona, Sr.	First Filipino governor of Agusan
2	1923–1931		Apolonio D. Curato, Sr.	
3	1932–1937		Jose A. Rosales	
4	1938–1940		Mariano C. Atega	
5	1941–1944		Agustin O. Casiñas	
6	1948–1951		Servano S. Jongko	
7	1952–1959		Felixberto C. Dagani, Sr.	
8	1960–1963		Democrito Plaza	
9	1964–1965		Jose C. Aquino	
10	1966–1967		Consuelo V. Calo	Last governor of Agusan, later became the first Governor of Agusan del Norte (1967–1986)

== See also ==
- Agusan del Norte
- Agusan del Sur
- Bukidnon
