= Camponay Falls =

- Location: Sibagat, Agusan del Sur, Mindanao, Philippines
- Type: Fan
- Total height: 12.0 m (39.4 ft)
- Number of drops: 2
- Average width: 9.85 feet (3.00 m)

Camponay Falls is located in Camponay Village in barangay Tabontabon, Sibagat, Agusan del Sur in the southern Philippine island of Mindanao. A cave can be found in the middle of the waterfalls within a secondary forests which is a potential for local outdoor and recreation site. Listed as one of the attractive landmarks in the province of Agusan del Sur.

== Etymology ==
Camponay Falls and Camponay Cave were named after its village name Sitio "Camponay."

The earlier settlers on this place named the place as "Camponay" which derived from the word "Campo" or "camp" where a military camp was established in early years.

== Geography ==
Camponay Waterfalls and Cave is located in the hinterlands of a remote village of Camponay, Barangay Tabontabon, Sibagat, Agusan del Sur.

It is 2.5 km away from the NRJ junction of Eureka, Tabon-tabon Pan-Philippine Maharlika Highway (Agusan–Davao Road).

It is 20.5 km away from Butuan and 13.5 km away from Barangay Poblacion, Sibagat, Agusan del Sur via Maharlika Highway.

It entails around an hour of trekking in order to get to the scenic destination of Camponay Waterfalls and Cave.

== See also ==
- Sibagat, Agusan del Sur
- Caraga Region
