= Trento, Agusan del Sur =

Municipality in Agusan del Sur, Philippines

Trento
- Municipality
- Municipality of Trento
- Trento Municipal Hall at the background

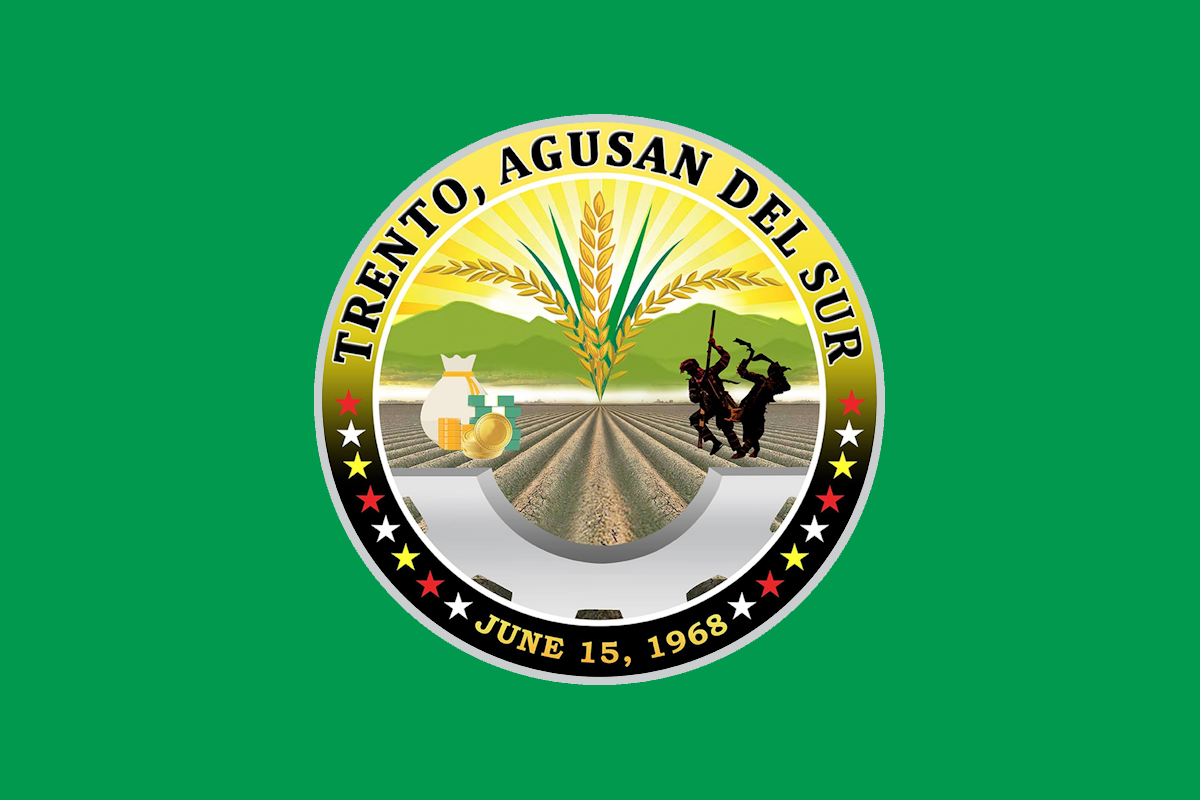
- Flag
- Etymology: Council of Trent
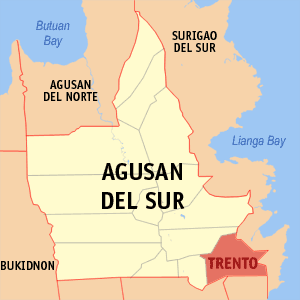
- Map of Agusan del Sur with Trento highlighted
- Interactive map of Trento
- Location within the Philippines
- Coordinates: 8°03′N 126°04′E
- Country: Philippines
- Region: Caraga
- Province: Agusan del Sur
- District: 2nd district
- Founded: June 15, 1968
- Named for: Trento, Italy
- Barangays: 16 (see Barangays)

Government
  - Type: Sangguniang Bayan
  - Mayor: William E. Calvez
  - Vice Mayor: Felimon S. Marte
  - Representative: Adolph Edward G. Plaza
  - Electorate: 33,779 voters (2025)

Area
  - Total: 555.7 km^{2} (214.6 sq mi)
- Elevation: 148 m (486 ft)
- Highest elevation: 808 m (2,651 ft)
- Lowest elevation: 0 m (0 ft)

Population (2024 census)
  - Total: 51,179
  - Density: 92.10/km^{2} (238.5/sq mi)
  - Households: 13,458
- Demonym: Trentini

Economy
  - Income class: 1st municipal income class
  - Poverty incidence: 20.63% (2023)
  - Revenue: ₱ 445.6 million (2024)
  - Assets: ₱ 1,120 million (2024)
  - Expenditure: ₱ 392 million (2024)
  - Liabilities: ₱ 268.2 million (2024)

Service provider
  - Electricity: Agusan del Sur Electric Cooperative (ASELCO)
- Time zone: UTC+8 (PST)
- ZIP code: 8505
- PSGC: 1600312000
- IDD : area code: +63 (0)85
- Native languages: Agusan; Butuanon; Cebuano; Higaonon; Tagalog
- Website: www.trento.gov.ph

Trento, officially the Municipality of Trento (Cebuano: Lungsod sa Trento; Tagalog: Bayan ng Trento), is a municipality in the province of Agusan del Sur, Philippines. According to the 2024 census, it has a population of 51,179 people.

Trento was formerly a barrio of Bunawan called Bahayan (referring to a lead sinker at the base of a fishing net). On June 15, 1968, it became a separate municipality through Republic Act No. 5283. The town's name was derived from the Council of Trent, and through it, the Italian city of Trento.

== Geography ==
Trento is located at 8°03′N 126°04′E.

According to the Philippine Statistics Authority, the municipality has a land area of 555.7 square kilometres (214.6 sq mi) constituting 5.56% of the 9,989.52-square-kilometre- (3,856.98 sq mi) total area of Agusan del Sur.

=== Climate ===
Climate data for Trento, Agusan del Sur
Month	Jan	Feb	Mar	Apr	May	Jun	Jul	Aug	Sep	Oct	Nov	Dec	Year
Mean daily maximum °C (°F)	27 (81)	27 (81)	27 (81)	29 (84)	29 (84)	29 (84)	30 (86)	30 (86)	30 (86)	30 (86)	29 (84)	28 (82)	29 (84)
Mean daily minimum °C (°F)	22 (72)	22 (72)	22 (72)	23 (73)	23 (73)	23 (73)	23 (73)	23 (73)	23 (73)	23 (73)	23 (73)	22 (72)	23 (73)
Average precipitation mm (inches)	105 (4.1)	80 (3.1)	58 (2.3)	39 (1.5)	62 (2.4)	75 (3.0)	69 (2.7)	62 (2.4)	59 (2.3)	71 (2.8)	69 (2.7)	69 (2.7)	818 (32)
Average rainy days	15.8	15.4	14.8	13.8	19.7	22.5	22.9	22.7	22.0	23.0	18.1	15.0	225.7
Source: Meteoblue

Trento is classified as Type II climate which has no dry season but with pronounced maximum rain period occurring from December to January.

=== Barangays ===
Trento is politically subdivided into 16 barangays. Each barangay consists of puroks while some have sitios.

PSGC	Barangay	Population			±% p.a.	
		2024		2010		
160312001	Basa	4.7%	2,382	1,927	▴	1.48%
160312014	Cebolin	2.1%	1,093	988	▴	0.70%
160312002	Cuevas	4.4%	2,265	2,070	▴	0.63%
160312003	Kapatungan	8.0%	4,091	3,947	▴	0.25%
160312004	Langkila-an	4.4%	2,236	1,822	▴	1.43%
160312015	Manat	7.4%	3,781	3,602	▴	0.34%
160312005	New Visayas	1.8%	906	828	▴	0.63%
160312016	Pangyan	1.1%	549	568	▾	−0.24%
160312006	Poblacion	35.4%	18,139	16,880	▴	0.50%
160312007	Pulang-lupa	6.6%	3,353	3,167	▴	0.40%
160312008	Salvacion	5.1%	2,594	2,184	▴	1.20%
160312009	San Ignacio	1.9%	959	781	▴	1.44%
160312010	San Isidro	3.3%	1,713	1,760	▾	−0.19%
160312011	San Roque	2.6%	1,348	1,214	▴	0.73%
160312012	Santa Maria	8.9%	4,535	3,781	▴	1.27%
160312013	Tudela	3.2%	1,621	1,674	▾	−0.22%
	Total		51,179	47,193	▴	0.56%

== Demographics ==
Population census of Trento
Year	Pop.	±% p.a.
1918	643	—
1939	477	−1.41%
1948	433	−1.07%
1970	11,815	+16.21%
1975	16,084	+6.38%
1980	19,257	+3.67%
1990	31,313	+4.98%
1995	36,946	+3.15%
2000	41,696	+2.63%
2007	46,247	+1.44%
2010	47,193	+0.74%
2015	51,565	+1.70%
2020	54,492	+1.17%
2024	51,179	−1.49%
Source: Philippine Statistics Authority

In the 2024 census, Trento had a population of 51,179. The population density was 92 inhabitants per square kilometre (240/sq mi).

== Economy ==
Poverty incidence of Trento (%)

Source: Philippine Statistics Authority

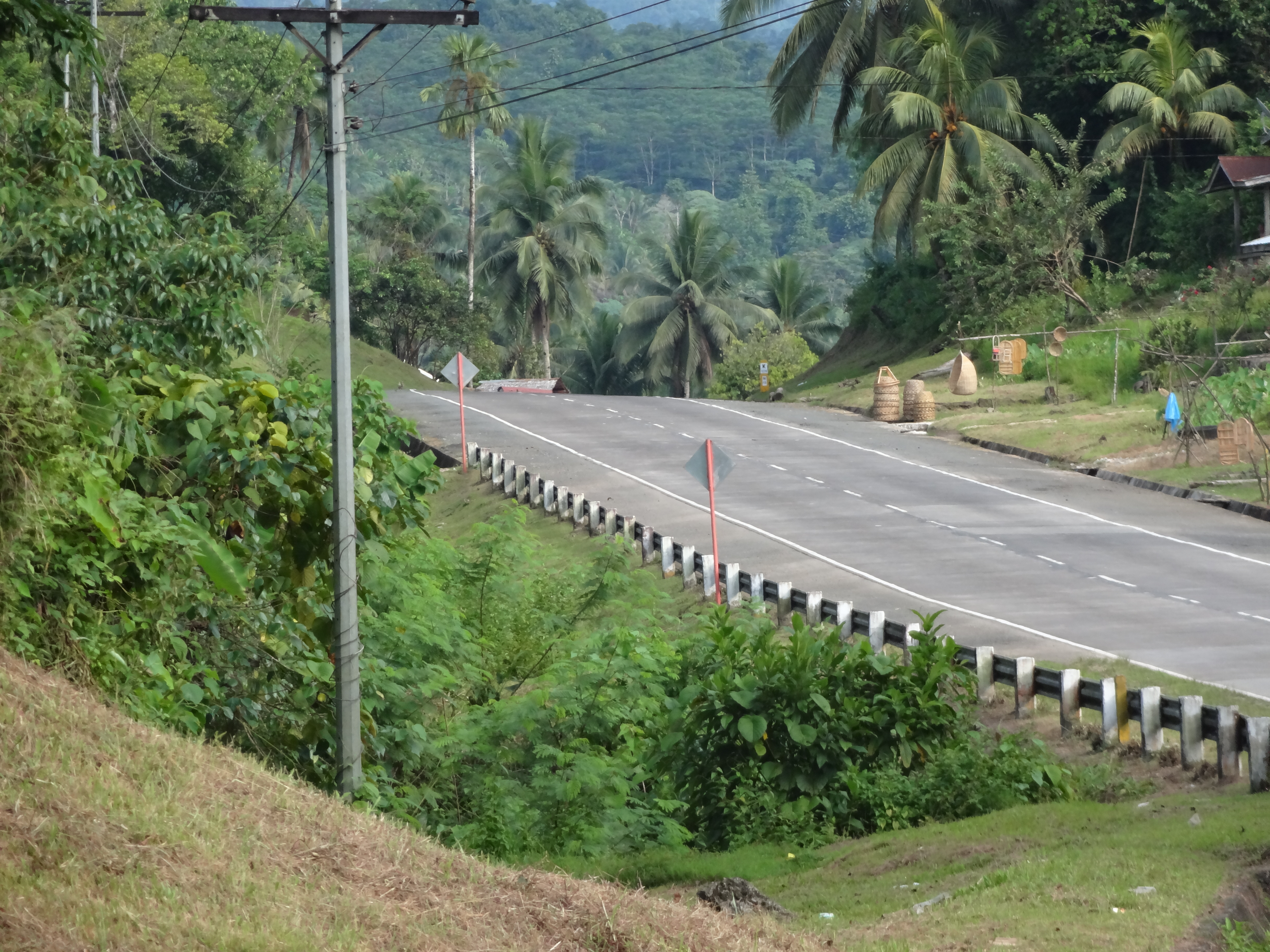
Highway in Trento

Its economy is dependent heavily on subsistence agriculture, wood products, and some mining.

== Education ==
- Trento National High School
- Father Saturnino Urios College Of Trento, Inc.
