= Agusan del Sur =

Province in Caraga, Philippines

- Province
- Flag Seal
- Anthem: Hail, Agusan del Sur
- Location in the Philippines
- Interactive map of Agusan del Sur
- Coordinates: 8°30′N 125°50′E
- Country: Philippines
- Region: Caraga
- Founded: 17 June 1967
- Capital: Prosperidad
- Largest city: Bayugan

Government
  - Governor: Santiago B. Cane Jr. (NUP)
  - Vice Governor: Patricia Anne B. Plaza (NUP)
  - Legislature: Agusan del Sur Provincial Board
  - Electorate: 446,642 voters (2025)

Area
  - Total: 9,989.52 km^{2} (3,856.98 sq mi)
  - Rank: 4th out of 82
- Highest elevation (Mount Datu Masuyapa): 1,678 m (5,505 ft)

Population (2024 census)
  - Total: 740,531
  - Rank: 41st out of 82
  - Density: 74.1308/km^{2} (191.998/sq mi)
  - Rank: 76th out of 82
  - Households: 173,962
- Demonym: South Agusanon

Divisions
  - Independent cities: 0
  - Component cities: 1: Bayugan
  - Municipalities: 13: Bunawan; Esperanza; La Paz; Loreto; Prosperidad; Rosario; San Francisco; San Luis; Santa Josefa; Sibagat; Talacogon; Trento; Veruela
  - Barangays: 314
  - Districts: Legislative districts of Agusan del Sur

Economy
  - Income class: 1st provincial income class
  - Poverty incidence: 23.4% (2023)
  - Revenue: ₱ 3,515 million (2024)
  - Assets: ₱ 14,791 million (2024)
  - Expenditure: ₱ 2,549 million (2024)
  - Liabilities: ₱ 1,383 million (2024)
- Time zone: UTC+8 (PHT)
- PSGC: 160300000
- IDD : area code: +63 (0)85
- ISO 3166 code: PH-AGS
- Spoken languages: Cebuano; Surigaonon; Butuanon; Agusan; Higaonon; Filipino
- Website: agusandelsur.gov.ph

Agusan del Sur, officially the Province of Agusan del Sur (lit. 'Southern Agusan'; Cebuano: Habagatang Agusan; Butuanon: Probinsya hong Agusan del Sur; Filipino: Lalawigan ng Agusan del Sur); is a landlocked province in Caraga region, Mindanao, Philippines. Its capital is the municipality of Prosperidad. It is bordered on the northwest by Agusan del Norte and Misamis Oriental; east by Surigao del Sur; southeast by Davao Oriental; mid-south by Davao de Oro; southwest by Davao del Norte and, mid-west by Bukidnon. It is the fourth largest province in the country in terms of area, with the size of 3,856 sq miles.

Agusan del Sur is the largest and the only landlocked province in the CARAGA region. Bayugan is the only city and it is also the most populated local government unit in the province.

== Etymology ==
Agusan derives its name from the Agusan word agasan, meaning "where the water flows", referring to the Agusan River that splits the land and meanders south to north in a 250-kilometre (160 mi) rush to Butuan Bay. The Agusan river is the third largest in the country and served as the highway for the Spanish colonizers in gaining access to inner northeastern Mindanao.

== History ==
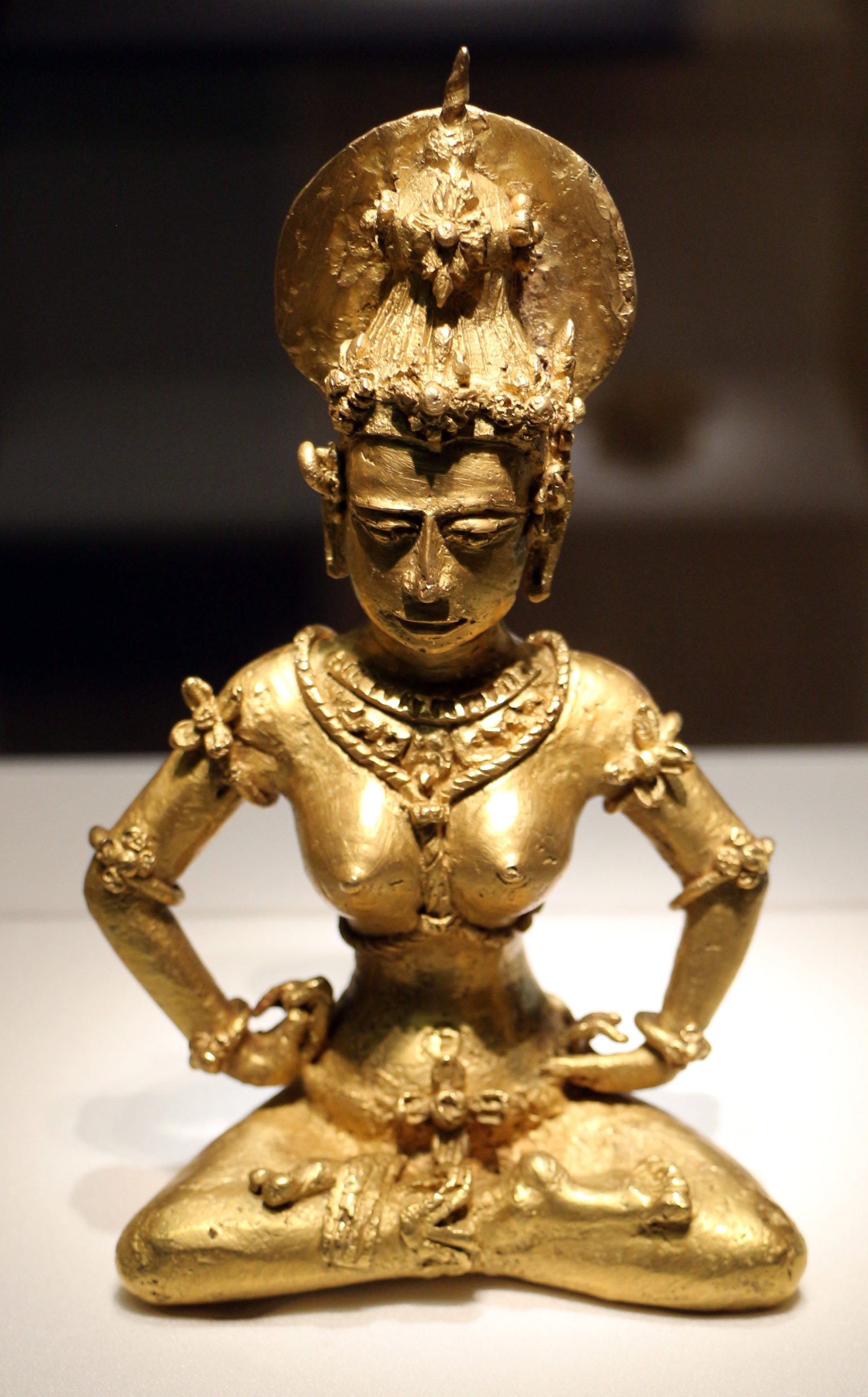
The Agusan image statue (900–950 CE) discovered in 1917 on the banks of the Wawa River near Esperanza, Agusan del Sur, Mindanao in the Philippines.

=== Early history ===
The history of Agusan del Sur is essentially linked with that of its sister province, Agusan del Norte.

Agusans pre-Hispanic cultural history is traced back to the great influence of the Majapahit Empire through the discovery of an 8-inch (200 mm) tall image of a woman in pure gold at Maasam, Esperanza in 1917 and molten jars unearthed at Bah-bah, Prosperidad. The aborigines of Agusan del Sur are the ancestors of the present day Mamanwas, who were driven to the hinterlands by waves of Malay immigrants. These immigrants, in turn, sought the protection of the interior jungles because of the forays and the constant raids of the Moros, who were seafaring people confined to coastal areas where they started their settlements.

=== Spanish colonial era ===
The Augustinian Recollects established a mission in Linao, in the vicinity of present-day Bunawan, in 1614. However, mission work was hampered by the hostility of the surrounding Manobo tribes. At the height of the power of the Sultanate of Maguindanao in the mid-17th century, the Manobos of the Agusan Valley were in alliance with Sultan Kudarat. Linao was attacked several times during the 1629 Caraga Revolt and the 1649 Sumuroy Revolt. Nevertheless, the Recollects were able to establish themselves in their mission work, and remained there until the middle of the 19th century.

In the late 19th century, the Recollects (under protest) turned over many of their mission territories, including those in the upper Agusan region, to the reconstituted Jesuit order (the Jesuits had been banned by Papal edict in the 1760s, and ejected from the Philippines in 1768). Missionary work was interrupted by the Philippine Revolution when the Jesuits either fled or were arrested by revolutionaries. The territory of Agusan del Sur was governed as part of the province of Caraga during most of the Spanish period. In 1860, it was placed under the comandancia of Butuan, a district of the province of Surigao.

=== American colonial era ===
During the American occupation, lumbering became an important activity in Agusan del Sur. Visayan migrants settled in the cleared plains, pushing Indigenous communities farther into the mountainous slopes.

In 1914, the province of Agusan was created by the American government.

The Agusan Valley was settled by a variety of cultural communities like the Manobos, Mamanwas and Higaonons. Archeological excavations in the lower Agusan valley plains have uncovered evidence of strong relationships between the region and the Southeast Asian states. A golden image of Javan-Indian design unearthed in the 1920s and molten jars uncovered in Prosperidad are indications that the region had commercial and cultural ties with the coast.

=== Japanese occupation ===
In the Second World War, Japanese troops landed in the province of Agusan in 1942 and occupied the province until their defeat by combined U.S. and Philippine Commonwealth troops as well as recognized guerrilla units in 1945 at the Battle of Agusan.

The general headquarters and military camp and base of the Philippine Commonwealth Army was active from January 3, 1942, to June 30, 1946, and the 10th Infantry Regiment of the Philippine Constabulary was active again from October 28, 1944, to June 30, 1946, are military stationed in the province of Surigao was composed to engaging operations against the Japanese Occupation.

During World War II, a unit of the joint Philippine-American defense force was located at Manot, Talacogon, in the interior of the Agusan Valley.

=== Postwar era ===
The province of Agusan del Sur was established on June 17, 1967, under Republic Act No. 4969 providing for the division of the province of Agusan into Agusan del Norte and Agusan del Sur.

In January 1970, the first set of provincial officials assumed office after the provincial election of November, 1969. The same law provided that the capital of Agusan del Sur be the municipality of Prosperidad. The Government Center has been set up in Barangay Patin-ay.

=== Martial law era ===
The 21-year administration of Ferdinand Marcos, which included 14 years of one-man rule under Marcos, saw the rise of ethnic conflicts and the overall degradation of peace and order in Agusan del Sur and throughout Mindanao - first in the form of conflicts between local Mindanaoan Muslims and Christian settlers which the Marcos administration had encouraged first to migrate and then to form militias, and later in the form of Muslim secessionist movements arising from outrage after the 1986 Jabidah massacre. Additionally, an economic crisis in late 1969 led to social unrest throughout the country, and violent crackdowns on protests led to the radicalization of many students, with some joining the New People's Army, bringing the Communist rebellion to Mindanao. In September 1972, Marcos was nearing the end of this last term allowed under the Philippines 1935 constitution when he placed the entirety of the Philippines under Martial Law, a period historically remembered for its human rights abuses, particularly targeting political opponents, student activists, journalists, religious workers, farmers, and others who fought against the Marcos dictatorship.

Numerous cults tapped by Marcos' military as force multipliers in their efforts against the Muslim secessionists and the communists. In Agusan del Sur, 1975 saw the formation of the "Lost Command" group by Philippine Army Lieutenant Colonel Carlos Lademora, which was described by Newsweek as "a clandestine army of 275 to 400 irregulars whose ostensible mission is to search out and destroy the enemies of President Ferdinand Marcos on the Philippine island of Mindanao." Named after a 1966 action movie, the group soon became known for its brutal tactics, and was specifically called out for such by Amnesty International in the report for its November 1981 Factfinding Mission to the Philippines.

=== Contemporary ===
The municipality of Bayugan became a component city by virtue of Republic Act No. 9405 which sought to convert the municipality into a city. The law was ratified on June 21, 2007. However, the cityhood status was lost twice in the years 2008 and 2010 after the LCP questioned the validity of the cityhood law. The cityhood status was reaffirmed after the court finalized its ruling on February 15, 2011 which declared the cityhood law constitutional.

== Geography ==
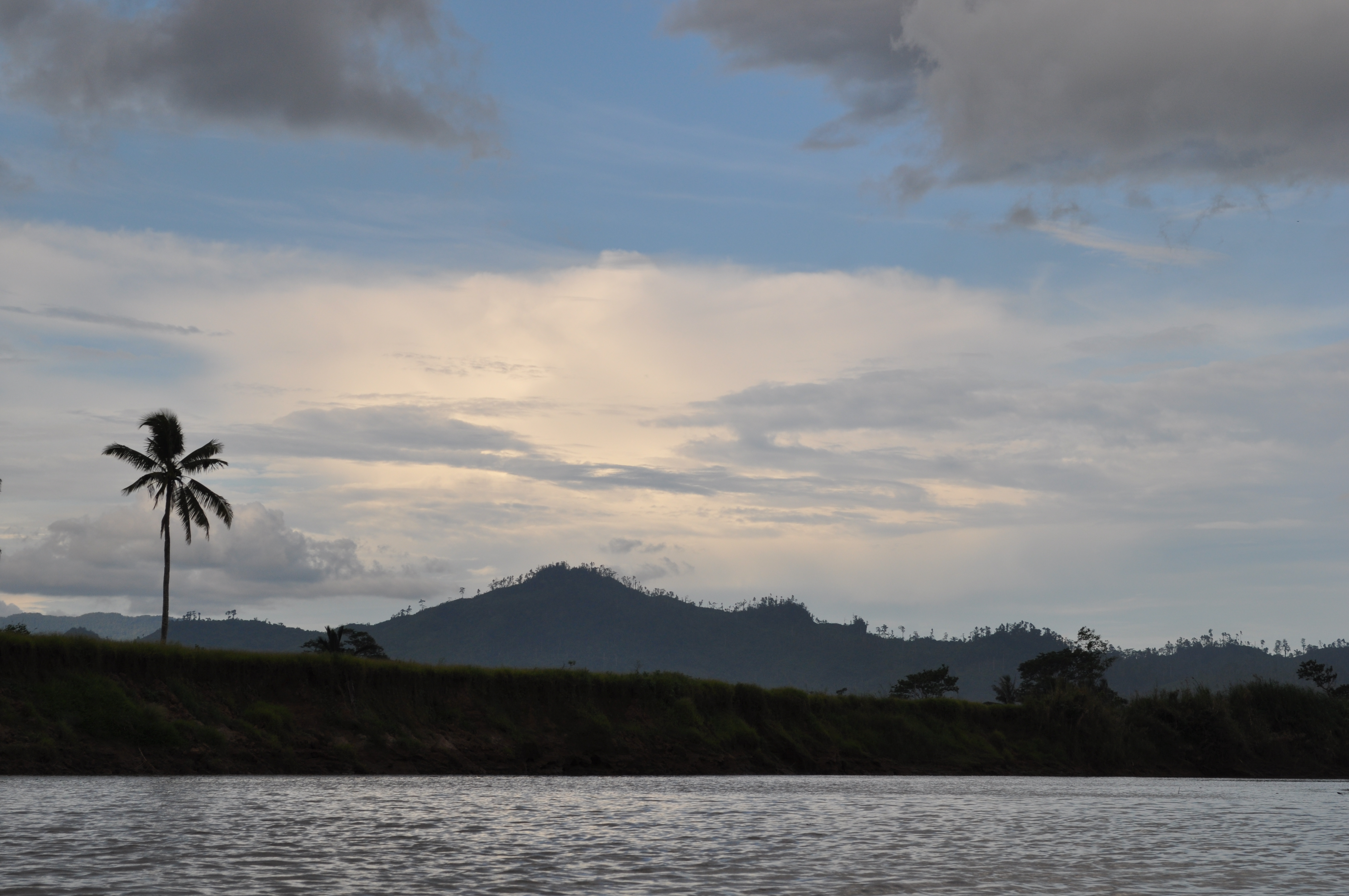
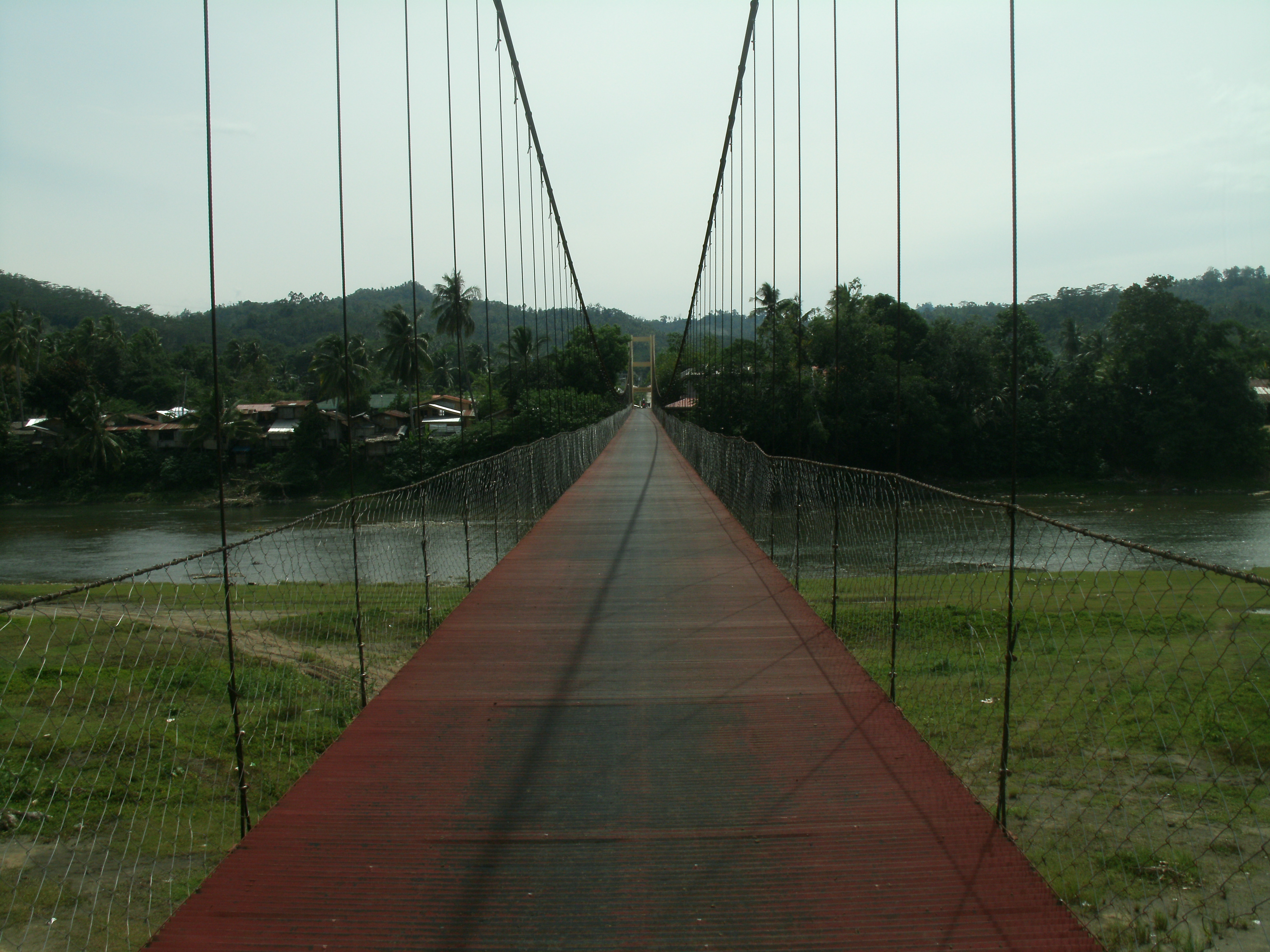
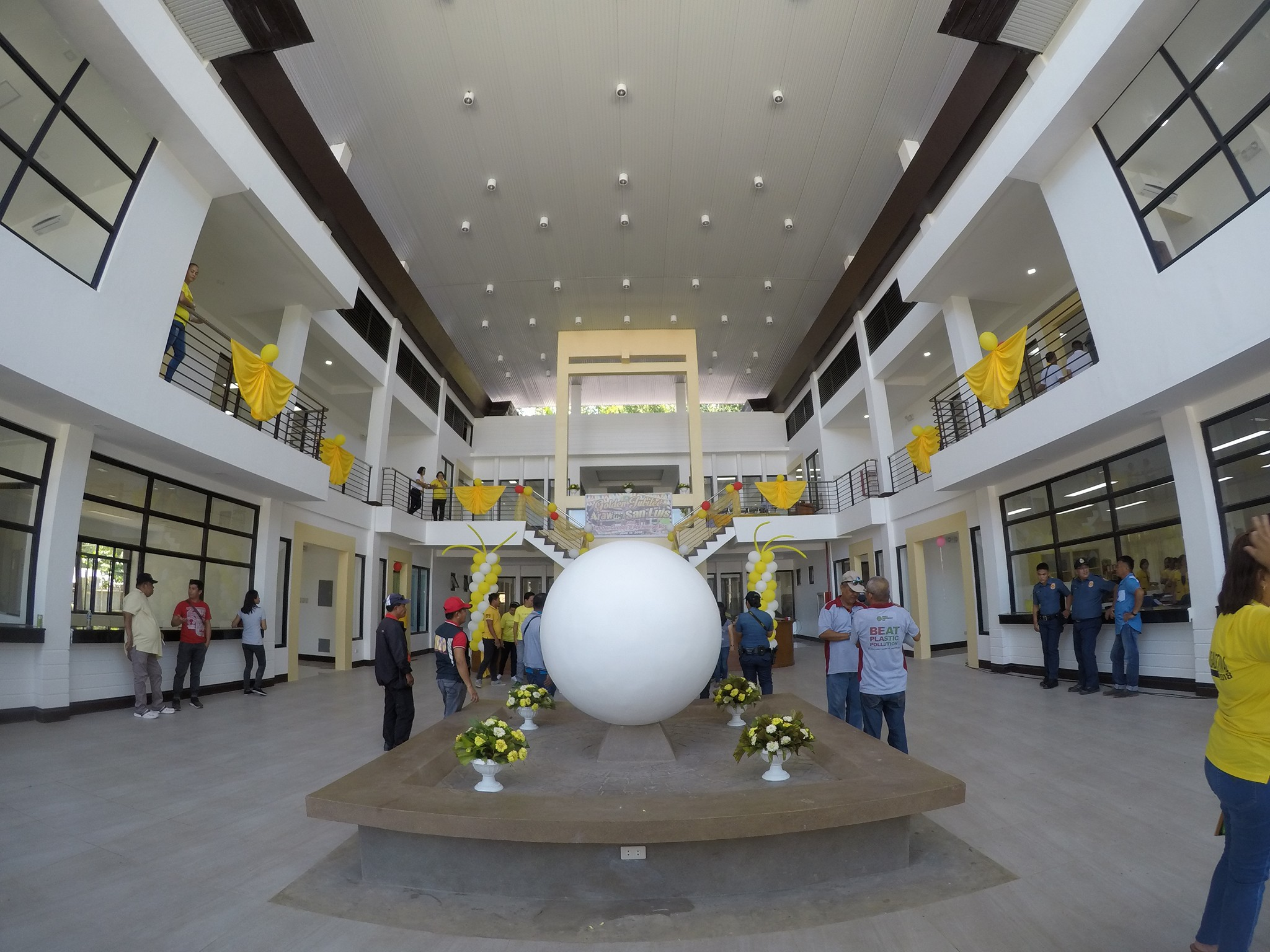
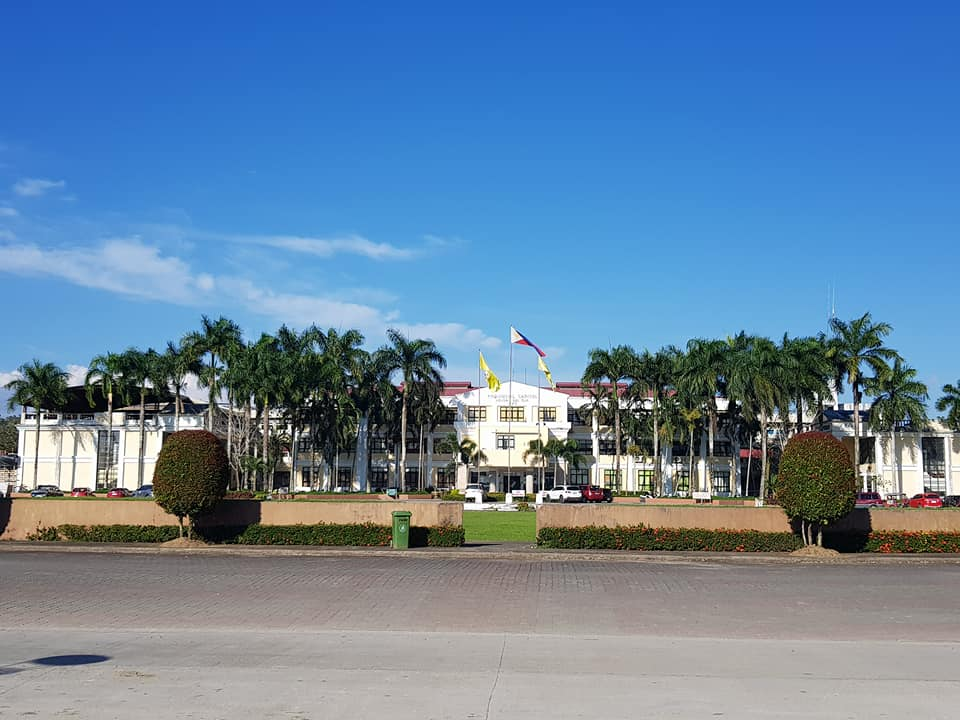
From top, left to right:
- Wawa River
- Sibagat Hanging Bridge
- Inside the Municipal Hall of San Luis
- Agusan del Sur Provincial Capitol in Prosperidad

=== Land area ===
In 1976, the province's land area was 8,568 square kilometres (3,308 sq mi), making it the seventh largest province in the country. After claiming the disputed boundary between Davao del Norte, Butuan and with the creation of Sibagat, Agusan del Sur now has an area of 8,966 square kilometres (3,462 sq mi).

The municipalities of Loreto, La Paz, Esperanza, and San Luis are the four largest municipalities in land area comprising almost 60% of the province's total land area. Santa Josefa and Talacogon, also river towns, have the smallest land area.

Forestland constitutes 76% of the total land area or 6,827.5 square kilometres (2,636.1 sq mi) while the alienable and disposable constitutes about 24% or 2,137.5 square kilometres (825.3 sq mi). Present land use, however, showed that settlements and commercial areas already occupy some of the forestlands.

Through the years, the province has lost much of its forest resources because existing industries are extractive in nature.

=== Topography ===
Agusan del Sur is an elongated basin formation with mountain ranges in the eastern and western sides forming a valley, which occupies the central longitudinal section of the land. The Agusan River, which flows from Davao de Oro in the south towards Agusan del Norte in the north, runs almost in the middle of the valley and empties at Butuan Bay. The river has twelve tributaries: Wawa, Gibong and Simulao Rivers in the eastern side and Ojot, Pusilao, Kasilayan, Libang, Maasam, Adgawan, Cawayan, Umayam and Ihaon Rivers in the western side. These tributaries are fed by streams and creeks. The southern half of the province from the municipality of Veruela is an area filled with swamps and lakes, the biggest of which is Talacogon Lake.

=== Climate ===
The climate map of the Philippines based on the modified coronas classification shows that the province falls under Type II.

Type II climate has no dry season with very pronounced wet season of heavy precipitation. Maximum rainfall generally occurs from December to January although there is no single dry month. Its average monthly rainfall is 355 millimetres (14.0 in) and average temperature is 27.15 °C (80.87 °F). Areas characterized by this climate type are generally along or very near the eastern coast thus are open to the northeast monsoon.

Agusan del Sur is among the 20 most vulnerable provinces to climate change in the Philippines.

=== Administrative divisions ===
Agusan del Sur comprises 13 municipalities and 1 city. There are 314 barangays.

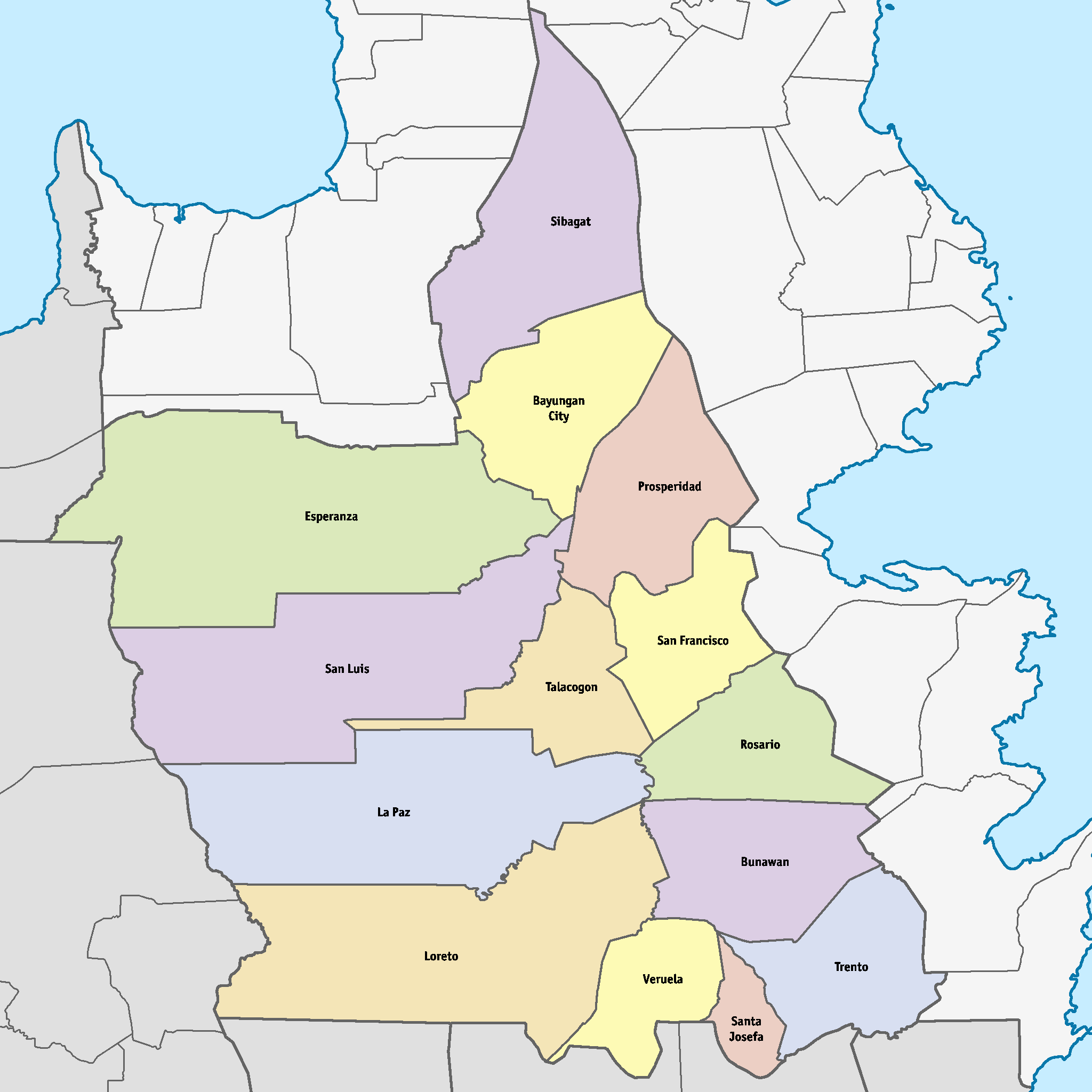
Political map of Agusan del Sur

City or municipality (Note: The globe icon marks the city/town center.)		District	Population			±% p.a.	Area		Density		Barangay
			(2020)		(2015)		km^{2}	sq mi	/km^{2}	/sq mi	
Bayugan City	∗	1st	14.8%	109,499	103,202	+1.13%	688.77	265.94	160	410	43
Bunawan		2nd	6.4%	47,512	45,151	+0.98%	512.16	197.75	93	240	10
Esperanza		1st	8.0%	59,353	54,801	+1.53%	1,355.48	523.35	44	110	47
La Paz		2nd	4.2%	30,969	28,217	+1.79%	1,481.12	571.86	21	54	15
Loreto		2nd	5.9%	43,880	42,501	+0.61%	1,462.74	564.77	30	78	17
Prosperidad	†	1st	11.9%	88,321	82,631	+1.28%	505.15	195.04	170	440	32
Rosario		2nd	6.7%	49,610	46,683	+1.16%	385.05	148.67	130	340	11
San Francisco		2nd	10.9%	80,760	74,542	+1.54%	392.53	151.56	210	540	27
San Luis		1st	4.8%	35,196	32,109	+1.76%	950.50	366.99	37	96	25
Santa Josefa		2nd	3.6%	26,432	26,729	−0.21%	341.80	131.97	77	200	11
Sibagat		1st	4.6%	33,957	30,442	+2.10%	567.82	219.24	60	160	24
Talacogon		1st	5.4%	39,678	38,374	+0.64%	405.25	156.47	98	250	16
Trento		2nd	7.4%	54,492	51,565	+1.06%	555.70	214.56	98	250	16
Veruela		2nd	5.4%	39,708	43,706	−1.81%	385.45	148.82	100	260	20
Total		739,367	700,653	+1.03%	9,989.52	3,856.98	74	190	314		
	† Capital Municipality			† Provincial capital			Municipality				

== Demographics ==
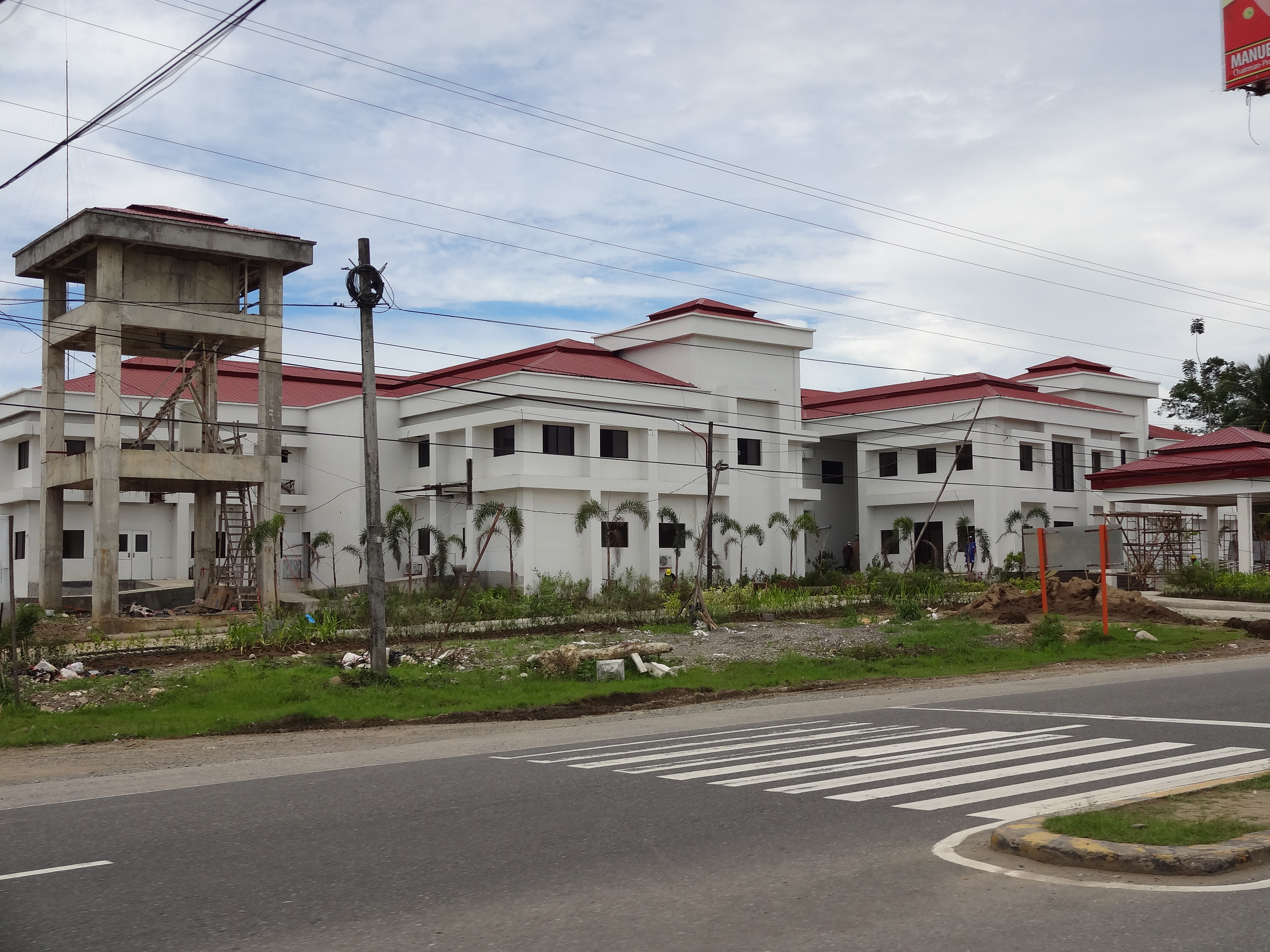
D.O. Plaza Memorial Hospital

Population census of Agusan del Sur

Year	Pop.	±% p.a.
1903	16,077	—
1918	20,011	+1.47%
1939	34,902	+2.68%
1948	37,531	+0.81%
1960	93,677	+7.92%
1970	174,682	+6.42%
1975	213,216	+4.08%
1980	265,030	+4.45%

Year	Pop.	±% p.a.
1990	420,763	+4.73%
1995	514,736	+3.85%
2000	559,294	+1.80%
2007	609,447	+1.19%
2010	656,418	+2.74%
2015	700,653	+1.25%
2020	739,367	+1.14%
2024	740,531	+0.04%

Source: PSA

The population of Agusan del Sur in the 2024 census was 740,531 people, with a density of 74 inhabitants per square kilometre or 190 inhabitants per square mile.

In 2000, the province had a population of 559,294. This represented an increase of 44,558 persons or 7.96% since 1995. The annual population growth rate was 1.79%. The 103,637 households had an average household size of 5.39 persons. The population density was 62 persons per square kilometer, with a male to female ratio of 107:100.

Five tribal groups are found in the province: Aeta, Mamanwa, Bagobo, Higaonon, and Manobo. The Manobos live along the national highway and river towns towards the boundary with Davao de Oro. The Higaonons live mostly on the western side of Agusan River, generally in Esperanza towards the boundary with Bukidnon.

The Agusan del Sur population is predominantly composed of migrants from the Visayas, who came from Cebu, Bohol, Siquijor and Negros Oriental as well as Cebuano-speaking parts of Mindanao. There are also significant minority residents in the province whose descendants came from Ilocandia, Cagayan Valley, Cordillera Administrative Region, Central Luzon, Calabarzon, Mindoro, Marinduque, Bicolandia, Panay, Negros Occidental and Samar. Intermarriages between migrants and natives have pulled down the percentage of the lumad stock.

Cebuano is the most common language spoken in Agusan del Sur. Filipino/Tagalog are also widely used and understood, often used for administrative functions by the local government and in education and business. Other languages varyingly spoken in the province include Bohol Cebuano, Butuanon, Ilocano, Hiligaynon, Pangasinan, Surigaonon and Waray. Indigenous inhabitants in the province speak their respective languages and dialects fluently in addition to Cebuano.

=== Religion ===
==== Catholicism ====
The predominant religion is Roman Catholicism with 79% of the population and the Iglesia Filipina Independiente with 12%. The Province is home to the Diocese of Prosperidad, which serves the whole Province.

==== Others ====
Other religions include the Members Church of God International (MCGI), Seventh-day Adventist Church, Iglesia ni Cristo, United Pentecostal Church, Born Again and the United Church of Christ in the Philippines, Islam and Latter Day Saints.

== Economy ==
Poverty incidence of Agusan del Sur (%)

Source: Philippine Statistics Authority

Based on the 1995 census, 75% of the labor force is engaged in agriculture and forestry. Rice, corn and fruits are among the major agricultural crops.

=== Human resources ===
Agusan del Sur has a labor force of 287,000 people, mostly in the agriculture and forestry sector. Several colleges, including a university, add to a trainable, English-speaking workforce. The province also has educational establishments offering skills development courses in Information Technology.

=== Agriculture ===
Rice occupies the largest cultivated area, with 243.85 square kilometres (94.15 sq mi) of irrigated area with a yield of 410 t/km^{2}, and rainfed rice with an area of about 165.73 square kilometres (63.99 sq mi) with a yield of 300 t/km^{2}. The province's rice production has the estimated capacity to feed 1,072,456 people—far more than the province's population. Ironically, rice insufficiency persists, especially in the upland and hard to reach barangays.

Corn plantations cover 255.25 square kilometres (98.55 sq mi) for both white and yellow corn with a total production of 55,767 t in 2000 with surplus corn grits of 31,106 MT enough to feed more than 2 million people, four times greater than the province's population.

Banana is another abundant crop covering an area of 127.45 square kilometres (49.21 sq mi). Banana chips are also processed in the province.

Oil palm plantation covers 118 square kilometres (46 sq mi). The plantation is a Malaysian-Filipino joint venture, with agrarian reform beneficiaries as land owners. Crude oil is processed in the sites of Rosario, and Trento.

Coconut trees are widespread in the province, covering 393.36 square kilometres (151.88 sq mi).

=== Poultry and livestock ===
Despite the government's efforts to increase poultry and livestock production, deficits in meat supply persist. Processed poultry and beef are imported from Davao City and Cagayan de Oro.

=== Fish ===
Agusan del Sur is highly dependent on Surigao del Sur and other nearby coastal provinces for the supply of marine products. However, the province has abundant supply of fresh water fish like mudfish, catfish and tilapia.

== Government ==
Agusan del Sur has two congressional districts encompassing its 13 municipalities and 1 component city.

District	Representative	City or municipality	District population (2015)
1st	Alfelito M. Bascug	Bayugan; Esperanza; Prosperidad; San Luis; Sibagat; Talacogon	341,559
2nd	Adolph Edward G. Plaza	Bunawan; La Paz; Loreto; Rosario; San Francisco; Santa Josefa; Trento; Veruela	359,094

=== History ===
Rufino C. Otero was elected as the first Provincial Governor and Democrito Plaza the first Congressman in the election of November 1969. The term of office of Congressman Democrito O. Plaza would have continued until December 1973 had it not for the proclamation of Martial Law on September 21, 1972, which in effect abolished the Congress. When the Interim Batasang Pambansa was convened in 1978 after almost a decade of absence under the martial Law, Edelmiro Amante represented the province in the National Assembly.

== Tourism ==
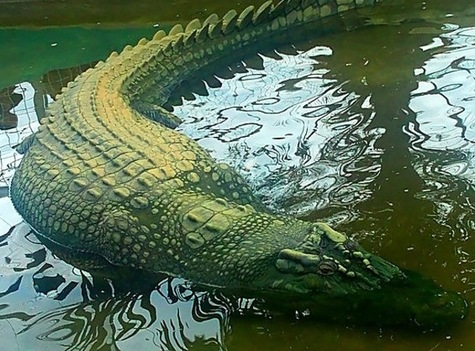
Lolong, the world's largest seawater crocodile in captivity was caught in the waters of the province

=== Attractions ===
- Agusan Marsh Wildlife Sanctuary—the largest wetland in the Philippines and the biggest marsh in Southeast Asia
- Pinandagatan Falls—located in Barangay New Tubigon, Sibagat, Agusan del Sur, a newly discovered untouched hidden paradise. According to Caraga Backpackers Group, Pinandagatan Falls could be the best waterfalls they saw in the entire Caraga Region
- Managong Falls—located in Barangay Padiay, Sibagat, Agusan del Sur, known to be the tallest waterfalls in the province and the strongest running waterfalls in Caraga Region.
- Bega Falls—located in Barangay Mabuhay, Prosperidad, Agusan del Sur
- Camponay Falls—located in Barangay Tabontabon, Sibagat, Agusan del Sur, a cave can be found in the middle of the waterfalls within secondary forests, which has potential as a local outdoor and recreation site
- Togongon Falls—located in Barangay Kolambugan, Sibagat, Agusan del Sur
- Binaba Falls—located in Barangay Mabuhay, Prosperidad, Agusan del Sur
- Tugonan Falls—located in Barangay San Lorenzo, Prosperidad, Agusan del Sur
- Wawa River (Agusan del Sur)—located in the municipalities of Sibagat, Bayugan, and Esperanza, Agusan del Sur
- Agusan River—a 250-kilometer river located in the municipalities of Santa Josefa, Veruela, Loreto, Talacogon, San Luis, and Esperanza, Agusan del Sur
- Gibong River—located in the municipalities of Prosperidad and Talacogon, Agusan del Sur
- Bunaguit Sea of Clouds—Barangay Bunaguit, Esperanza, Agusan del Sur
- Naliyagan Cultural Center—Provincial Landmark, Provincial Capitol Complex, Barangay Patin-ay, Prosperidad, Agusan del Sur
- Centennial Toog Tree—more than 300 years old and stands at 65-meters high, the tallest rosewood tree in the Philippines located in San Francisco, Agusan del Sur
- Mount Magdiwata Watershed—San Francisco, Agusan del Sur
- Puting Buhangin Cave—Barangay Poblacion, Prosperidad, Agusan del Sur

=== Festivals ===
- Naliyagan Festival - a week long celebration of Agusan del Sur charter day anniversary

== Notable people ==
- Bayang Barrios—a Filipino Musician and Singer from Bunawan, Agusan del Sur
- Grace Nono—a Filipino Singer, ethnomusicologist and scholar of Philippine shamanism from Bunawan, Agusan del Sur
- Dennis Laurente—a Filipino Professional Boxer raised in Sibagat, Agusan del Sur
- Rene Baterbonia—a Filipino Basketball Athlete from Talacogon, Agusan del Sur, died in June 8, 2026.
