= Loreto, Agusan del Sur =

Municipality in Agusan del Sur, Philippines

Loreto
- Municipality
- Municipality of Loreto
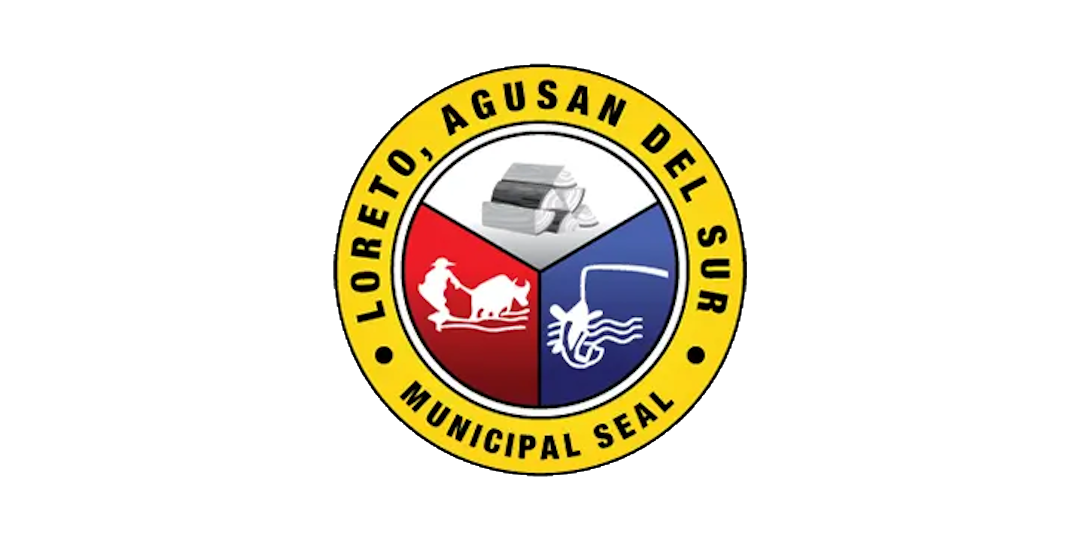
- Flag

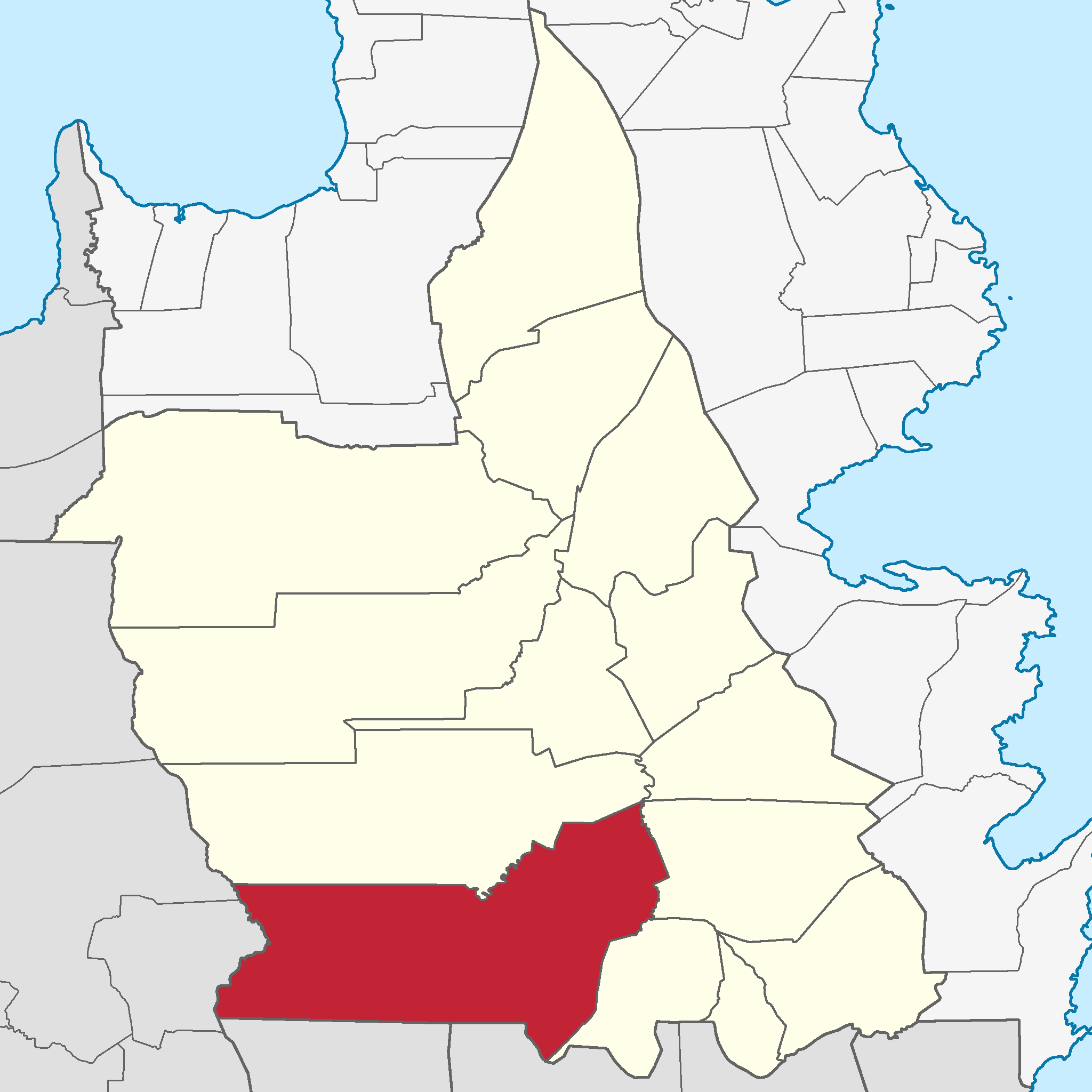
- Map of Agusan del Sur with Loreto highlighted
- Interactive map of Loreto
- Location within the Philippines
- Coordinates: 8°11′N 125°51′E
- Country: Philippines
- Region: Caraga
- Province: Agusan del Sur
- District: 2nd district
- Founded: March 30, 1965
- Barangays: 17 (see Barangays)

Government
  - Type: Sangguniang Bayan
  - Mayor: Lorife M. Otaza
  - Vice Mayor: Randolph B. Plaza
  - Representative: Adolph Edward G. Plaza
  - Electorate: 25,966 voters (2025)

Area
  - Total: 1,462.74 km^{2} (564.77 sq mi)
- Elevation: 335 m (1,099 ft)
- Highest elevation: 1,658 m (5,440 ft)
- Lowest elevation: 16 m (52 ft)

Population (2024 census)
  - Total: 43,761
  - Density: 29.917/km^{2} (77.485/sq mi)
  - Households: 10,136

Economy
  - Income class: 1st municipal income class
  - Poverty incidence: 37.27% (2023)
  - Revenue: ₱ 521.9 million (2024)
  - Assets: ₱ 1,679 million (2024)
  - Expenditure: ₱ 435 million (2024)
  - Liabilities: ₱ 642.3 million (2024)

Service provider
  - Electricity: Agusan del Sur Electric Cooperative (ASELCO)
- Time zone: UTC+8 (PST)
- ZIP code: 8507
- PSGC: 1600305000
- IDD : area code: +63 (0)85
- Native languages: Agusan; Butuanon; Cebuano; Higaonon; Tagalog

Loreto, officially the Municipality of Loreto (Cebuano: Lungsod sa Loreto; Tagalog: Bayan ng Loreto), is a municipality in the province of Agusan del Sur, Philippines. According to the 2024 census, it has a population of 43,761 people. It is the largest municipality in terms of land area in Mindanao.

== History ==
In 1600, the Spanish conquistadors first came to the upper reaches of Agusan. In 1879, Fr. Saturnino Urios, a Spanish Jesuit missionary from Xativa, came to what was then known as Umajam and met the Manobos. Fr. Urios convinced the Manobos to relocate into one single settlement that he named as Loreto (not from his town in Spain, as sometimes it's said).

=== Rain of fish ===
On a rainy morning on January 13, 2012, Loreto became nationally notable when it became the site of a rain of fish. Seventy-two small fish were recovered and placed in an aquarium. They were about 3 in (7.6 cm) long and had small spots, but the species remains unknown. The Bureau of Fisheries and Aquatic Resources attributes the phenomenon to a waterspout.

== Geography ==
According to the Philippine Statistics Authority, the municipality has a land area of 1,462.74 square kilometres (564.77 sq mi) constituting 14.64% of the 9,989.52-square-kilometre- (3,856.98 sq mi) total area of Agusan del Sur.

Loreto is a river town situated south-west of Agusan del Sur. It is bounded on the north by La Paz, north-east by Bunawan, and southeast by Veruela. The provinces of Bukidnon and Davao del Norte bound its Western and Southern portions.

Loreto is a strategically situated as a junction point to various destination within Agusan del Sur and nearby provinces. The accessibility of Loreto to Provincial Center, Patin-ay in Prosperidad has three main routes: the Loreto-Santa Josefa-Trento route of 118.36 kilometres (73.55 mi), the Loreto-La Paz Talacogon route of 85.53 kilometres (53.15 mi), and the Loreto-Bunawan route of 87.52 kilometres (54.38 mi) with two hours of Pump boat cruising the Agusan River.

=== Climate ===
Climate data for Loreto, Agusan del Sur
Month	Jan	Feb	Mar	Apr	May	Jun	Jul	Aug	Sep	Oct	Nov	Dec	Year
Mean daily maximum °C (°F)	27 (81)	27 (81)	28 (82)	30 (86)	30 (86)	30 (86)	30 (86)	30 (86)	30 (86)	30 (86)	29 (84)	28 (82)	29 (84)
Mean daily minimum °C (°F)	23 (73)	23 (73)	22 (72)	23 (73)	24 (75)	24 (75)	24 (75)	24 (75)	24 (75)	24 (75)	23 (73)	23 (73)	23 (74)
Average precipitation mm (inches)	105 (4.1)	72 (2.8)	55 (2.2)	40 (1.6)	69 (2.7)	94 (3.7)	100 (3.9)	103 (4.1)	99 (3.9)	106 (4.2)	85 (3.3)	63 (2.5)	991 (39)
Average rainy days	17.6	16.0	14.9	14.0	20.9	24.3	25.3	25.5	24.5	24.7	19.7	16.7	244.1
Source: Meteoblue

=== Barangays ===
Loreto is politically subdivided into 17 barangays. Each barangay consists of puroks while some have sitios.

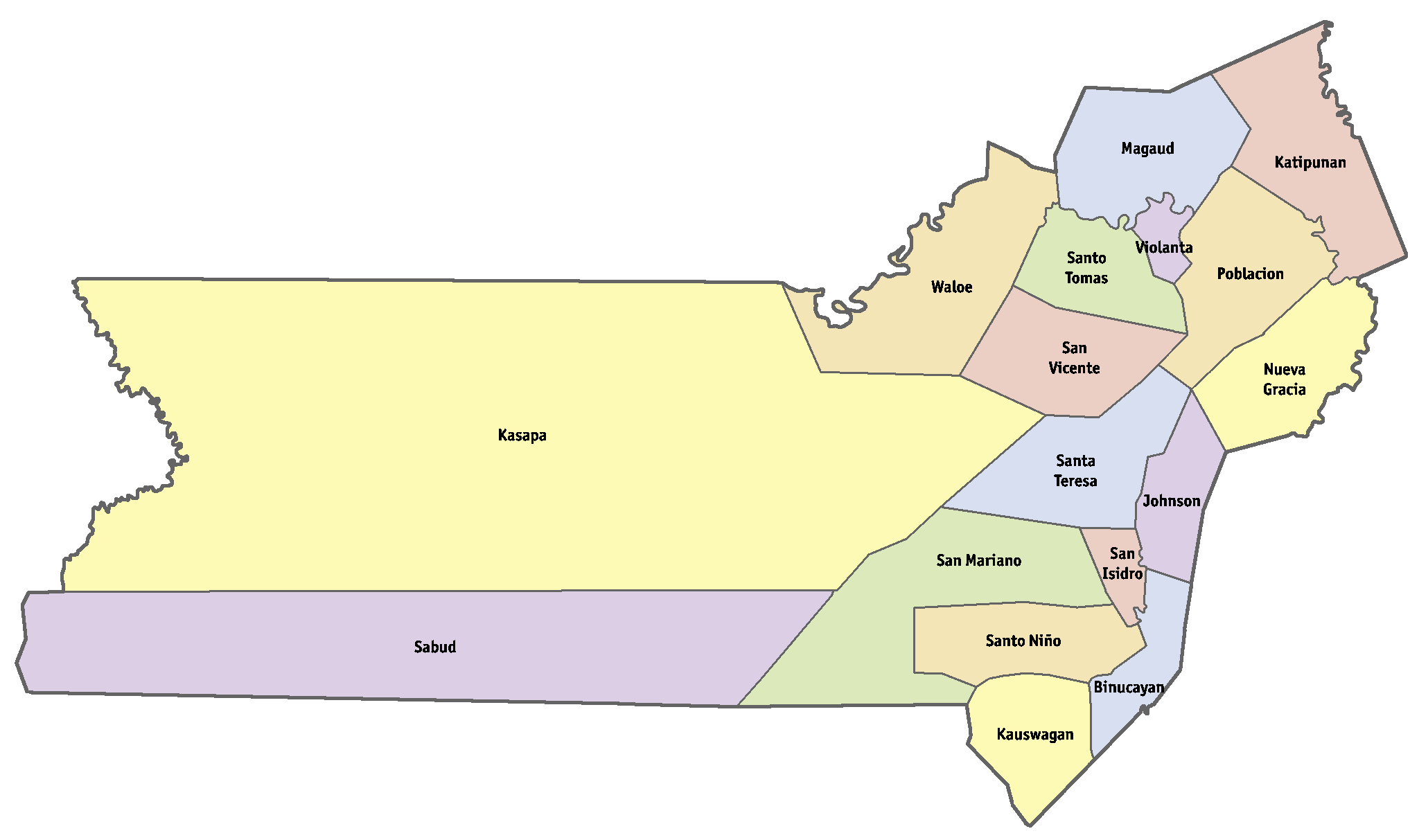
Political map of Loreto

PSGC	Barangay	Population			±% p.a.	
		2024		2010		
160305001	Binucayan	6.4%	2,781	3,605	▾	−1.79%
160305002	Johnson	3.3%	1,433	1,547	▾	−0.53%
160305013	Kasapa	4.0%	1,738	3,122	▾	−3.98%
160305014	Katipunan	1.2%	525	677	▾	−1.75%
160305015	Kauswagan	5.6%	2,445	2,182	▴	0.79%
160305003	Magaud	7.6%	3,314	2,303	▴	2.56%
160305004	Nueva Gracia	5.2%	2,270	1,928	▴	1.14%
160305005	Poblacion	14.6%	6,384	6,456	▾	−0.08%
160305017	Sabud	10.0%	4,367	779	▴	12.71%
160305006	San Isidro	3.7%	1,601	1,532	▴	0.31%
160305007	San Mariano	5.5%	2,411	2,709	▾	−0.81%
160305008	San Vicente	4.9%	2,163	2,227	▾	−0.20%
160305009	Santa Teresa	5.3%	2,325	2,324	▴	0.00%
160305016	Santo Niño	2.5%	1,088	1,221	▾	−0.80%
160305010	Santo Tomas	8.8%	3,859	3,674	▴	0.34%
160305011	Violanta	3.3%	1,439	1,174	▴	1.42%
160305012	Waloe	5.4%	2,358	2,014	▴	1.10%
	Total		43,761	39,474	▴	0.72%

== Demographics ==
Population census of Loreto
Year	Pop.	±% p.a.
1918	2,447	—
1939	4,395	+2.83%
1948	4,125	−0.70%
1960	6,248	+3.52%
1970	13,057	+7.64%
1975	16,264	+4.50%
1980	18,781	+2.92%
1990	21,133	+1.19%
1995	24,022	+2.43%
2000	31,365	+5.88%
2007	34,549	+1.34%
2010	39,474	+4.97%
2015	42,501	+1.42%
2020	43,880	+0.67%
2024	43,761	−0.07%
Source: Philippine Statistics Authority

According to the 2024 census, Loreto had a population of 43,761. The population density was 30 inhabitants per square kilometre (78/sq mi).

== Economy ==
Poverty incidence of Loreto (%)

Source: Philippine Statistics Authority
