= Rosario, Agusan del Sur =

Municipality in Agusan del Sur, Philippines

Rosario
- Municipality
- Municipality of Rosario
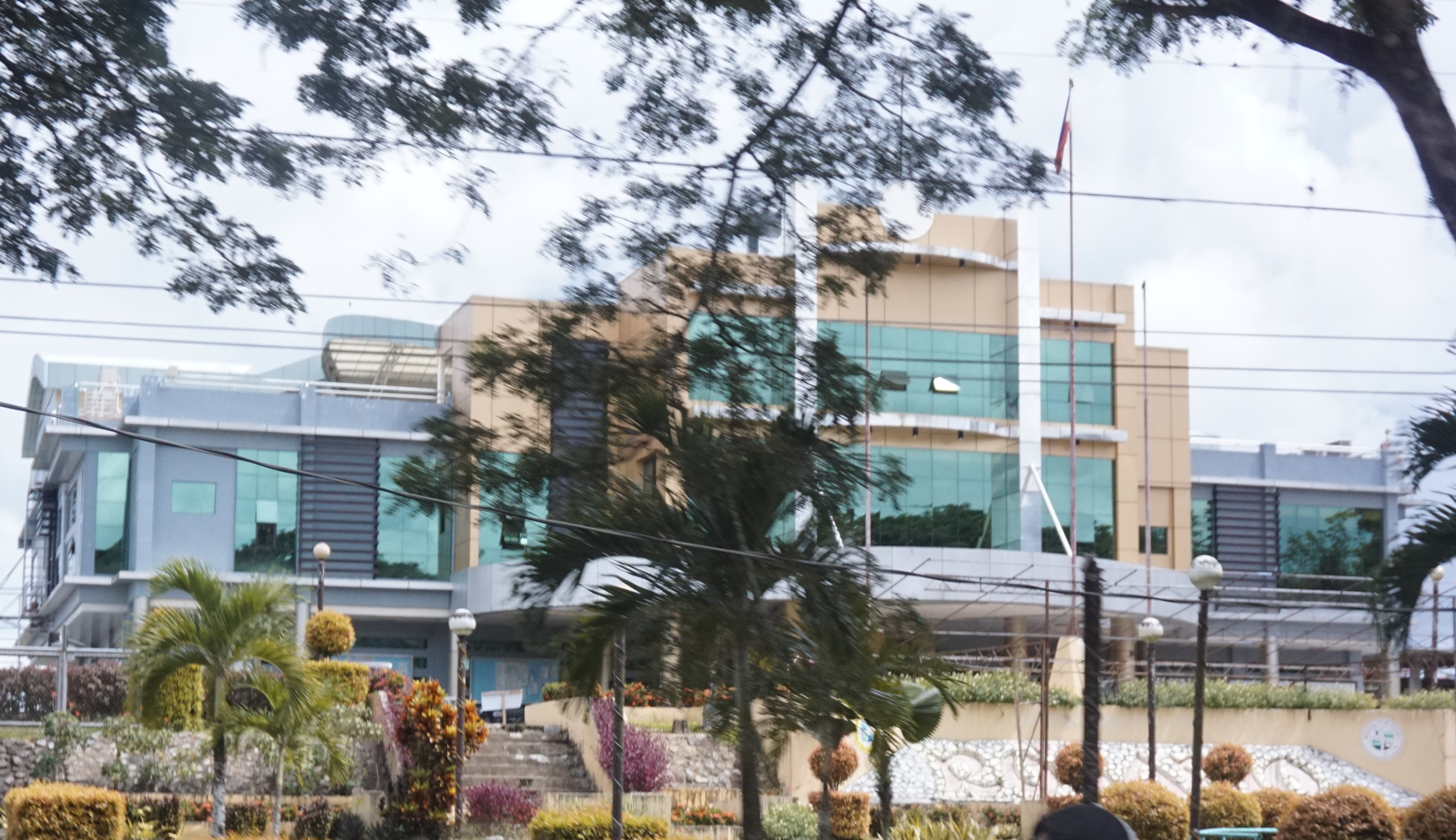
- Rosario municipal hall

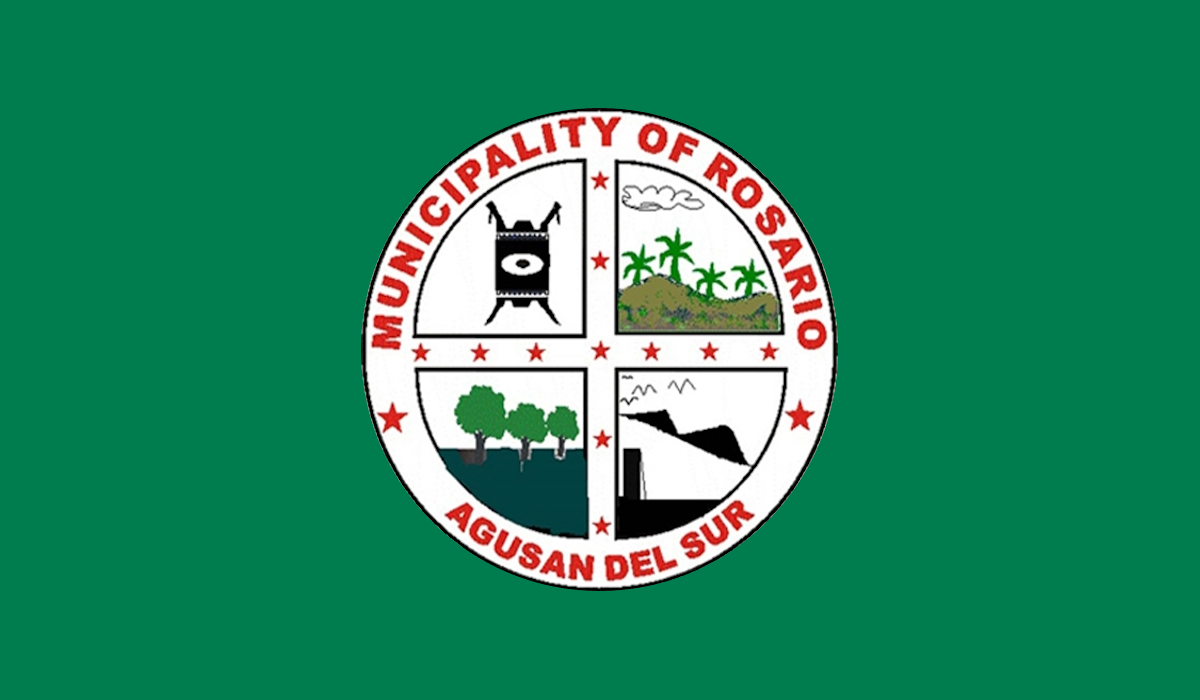
- Flag Seal

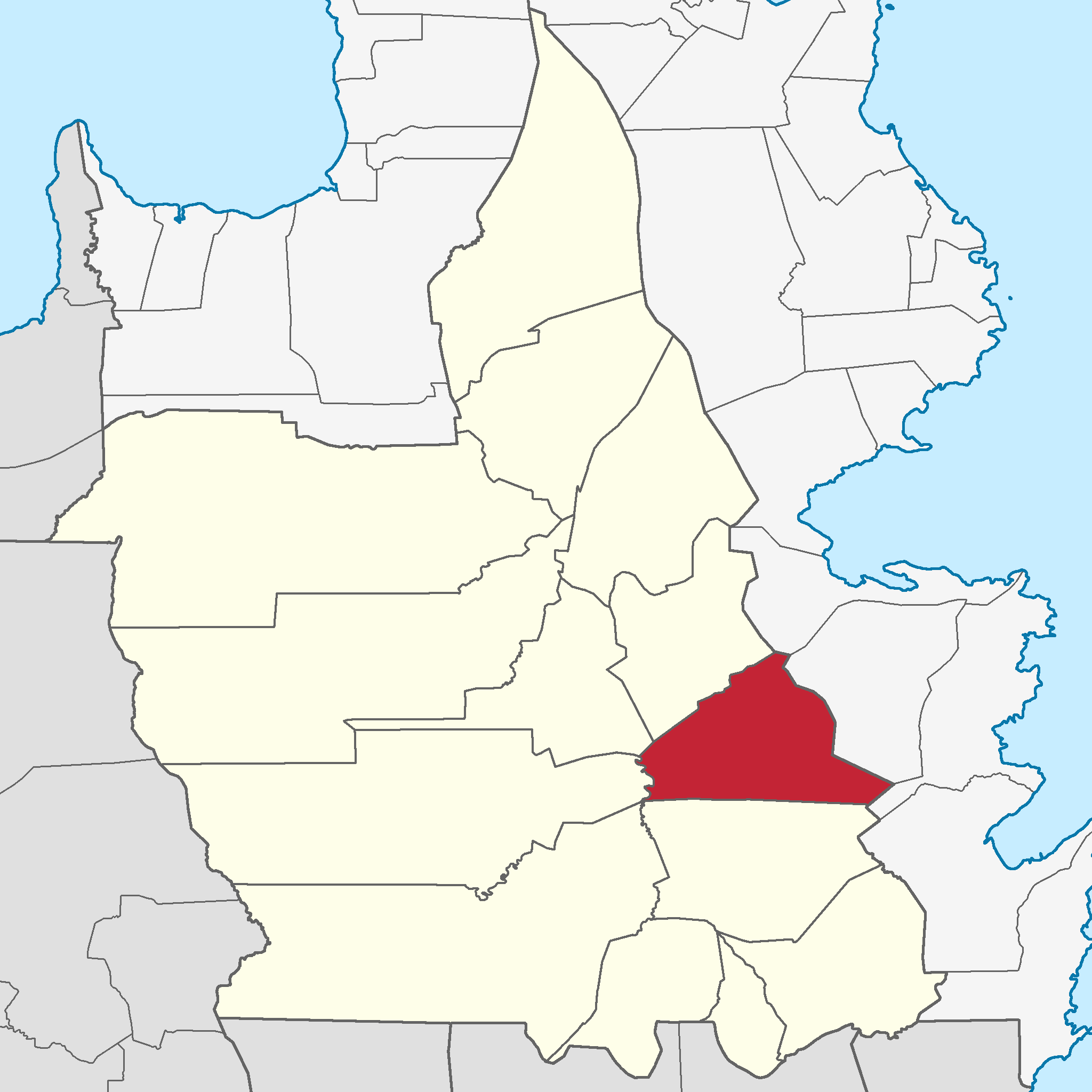
- Map of Agusan del Sur with Rosario highlighted
- Interactive map of Rosario
- Location within the Philippines
- Coordinates: 8°23′N 126°00′E
- Country: Philippines
- Region: Caraga
- Province: Agusan del Sur
- District: 2nd district
- Barangays: 11 (see Barangays)

Government
  - Type: Sangguniang Bayan
  - Mayor: Jose T. Cuyos, Sr.
  - Vice Mayor: Eduardo E. De Paz
  - Representative: Adolph Edward G. Plaza
  - Electorate: 37,015 voters (2025)

Area
  - Total: 385.05 km^{2} (148.67 sq mi)
- Elevation: 102 m (335 ft)
- Highest elevation: 804 m (2,638 ft)
- Lowest elevation: 0 m (0 ft)

Population (2024 census)
  - Total: 51,207
  - Density: 132.99/km^{2} (344.44/sq mi)
  - Households: 11,671

Economy
  - Income class: 1st municipal income class
  - Poverty incidence: 24.13% (2023)
  - Revenue: ₱ 320.4 million (2024)
  - Assets: ₱ 926 million (2024)
  - Expenditure: ₱ 336.2 million (2024)
  - Liabilities: ₱ 414.3 million (2024)

Service provider
  - Electricity: Agusan del Sur Electric Cooperative (ASELCO)
- Time zone: UTC+8 (PST)
- ZIP code: 8504
- PSGC: 1600307000
- IDD : area code: +63 (0)85
- Native languages: Agusan; Butuanon; Cebuano; Higaonon; Tagalog
- Website: www.rosario.gov.ph

Rosario, officially the Municipality of Rosario (Cebuano: Lungsod sa Rosario; Tagalog: Bayan ng Rosario), is a municipality in the province of Agusan del Sur, Philippines. According to the 2024 census, it has a population of 51,207 people.

Rosario was historically part of San Francisco until June 21, 1969, when it became a separate municipality through Republic Act No. 5760. The town was named after its patron saint Virgen de Rosario.

== Geography ==
According to the Philippine Statistics Authority, the municipality has a land area of 385.05 square kilometres (148.67 sq mi) constituting 3.85% of the 9,989.52-square-kilometre- (3,856.98 sq mi) total area of Agusan del Sur.

=== Climate ===
Climate data for Rosario, Agusan del Sur
Month	Jan	Feb	Mar	Apr	May	Jun	Jul	Aug	Sep	Oct	Nov	Dec	Year
Mean daily maximum °C (°F)	27 (81)	27 (81)	27 (81)	29 (84)	29 (84)	29 (84)	29 (84)	30 (86)	30 (86)	29 (84)	28 (82)	28 (82)	29 (83)
Mean daily minimum °C (°F)	22 (72)	21 (70)	22 (72)	22 (72)	23 (73)	23 (73)	23 (73)	23 (73)	23 (73)	23 (73)	22 (72)	22 (72)	22 (72)
Average precipitation mm (inches)	64 (2.5)	48 (1.9)	40 (1.6)	28 (1.1)	41 (1.6)	48 (1.9)	38 (1.5)	34 (1.3)	33 (1.3)	46 (1.8)	52 (2.0)	53 (2.1)	525 (20.6)
Average rainy days	13.9	12.5	12.2	12.2	16.5	17.6	17.5	17.4	16.6	19.0	16.6	14.6	186.6
Source: Meteoblue

=== Barangays ===
Rosario is politically subdivided into 11 barangays. Each barangay consists of puroks while some have sitios.

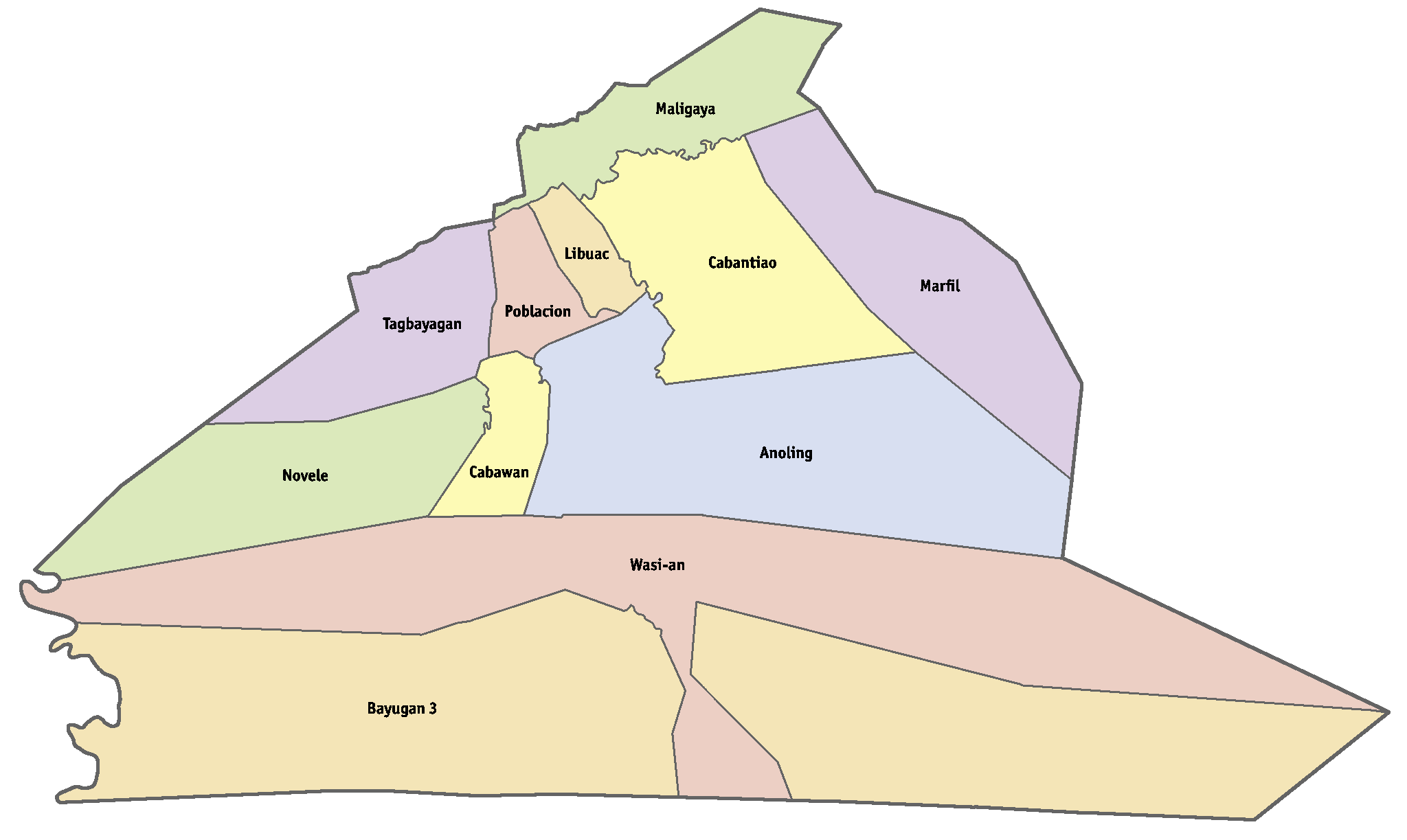
Political map of Rosario

PSGC	Barangay	Population			±% p.a.	
		2024		2010		
160307001	Bayugan 3 (Barangay)	27.2%	13,922	11,159	▴	1.55%
160307002	Cabantao	3.4%	1,723	1,446	▴	1.22%
160307003	Cabawan	2.7%	1,357	1,216	▴	0.76%
160307010	Libuac	6.0%	3,085	2,686	▴	0.97%
160307011	Maligaya	3.3%	1,706	1,435	▴	1.21%
160307004	Marfil	3.7%	1,914	2,070	▾	−0.54%
160307005	Novele	5.3%	2,695	2,278	▴	1.17%
160307006	Poblacion	10.0%	5,131	4,331	▴	1.18%
160307007	Santa Cruz	16.9%	8,659	6,029	▴	2.55%
160307008	Tagbayagan	4.1%	2,100	2,017	▴	0.28%
160307009	Wasi-an	8.6%	4,391	3,613	▴	1.36%
	Total		51,207	38,280	▴	2.04%

== Demographics ==
Population census of Rosario
Year	Pop.	±% p.a.
1918	291	—
1970	7,885	+6.55%
1975	9,774	+4.40%
1980	12,443	+4.95%
1990	25,436	+7.41%
1995	26,836	+1.01%
2000	28,675	+1.43%
2007	31,293	+1.21%
2010	38,280	+7.61%
2015	46,683	+3.85%
2020	49,610	+1.29%
2024	51,207	+0.76%
Source: Philippine Statistics Authority

In the 2024 census, Rosario had a population of 51,207. The population density was 130 inhabitants per square kilometre (340/sq mi).

=== Economy ===
Poverty incidence of Rosario (%)

Source: Philippine Statistics Authority

=== Industry ===
Rosario is home to the field site of Philsaga Mining Corporation, the only large-scale gold mining company in Agusan del Sur.
