= Talacogon =

Municipality in Agusan del Sur, Philippines

- Municipality
- Municipality of Talacogon
- Municipal hall

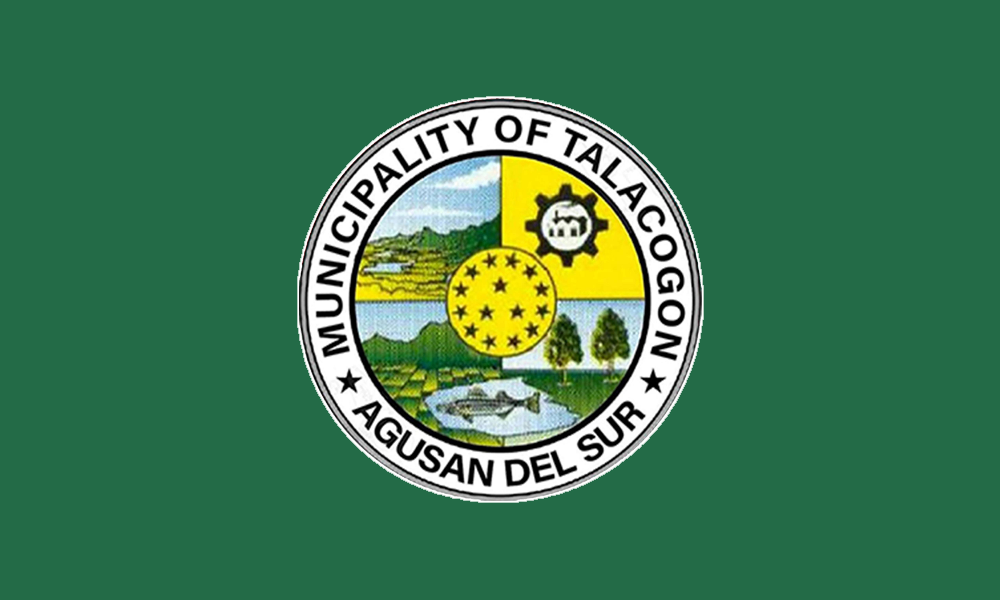
- Flag

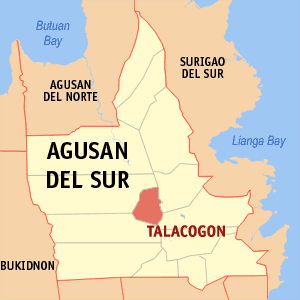
- Map of Agusan del Sur with Talacogon highlighted
- Interactive map of Talacogon
- Location within the Philippines
- Coordinates: 8°27′N 125°47′E
- Country: Philippines
- Region: Caraga
- Province: Agusan del Sur
- District: 1st district
- Founded: November 13, 1872
- Barangays: 16 (see Barangays)

Government
  - Type: Sangguniang Bayan
  - Mayor: Pauline Marie R. Masendo, RN
  - Vice Mayor: Elvin L. Maligsa
  - Representative: Alfelito M. Bascug
  - Electorate: 23,177 voters (2025)

Area
  - Total: 405.25 km^{2} (156.47 sq mi)
- Elevation: 50 m (160 ft)
- Highest elevation: 568 m (1,864 ft)
- Lowest elevation: 13 m (43 ft)

Population (2024 census)
  - Total: 37,744
  - Density: 93.138/km^{2} (241.23/sq mi)
  - Households: 9,267

Economy
  - Income class: 1st municipal income class
  - Poverty incidence: 31.05% (2023)
  - Revenue: ₱ 266.9 million (2024)
  - Assets: ₱ 593 million (2024)
  - Expenditure: ₱ 266.5 million (2024)
  - Liabilities: ₱ 179.3 million (2024)

Service provider
  - Electricity: Agusan del Sur Electric Cooperative (ASELCO)
- Time zone: UTC+8 (PST)
- ZIP code: 8510
- PSGC: 1600311000
- IDD : area code: +63 (0)85
- Native languages: Agusan; Butuanon; Higaonon; Tagalog
- Website: www.talacogon.gov.ph

Talacogon, officially the Municipality of Talacogon (Cebuano: Lungsod sa Talacogon; Tagalog: Bayan ng Talacogon), is a municipality in the province of Agusan del Sur, Philippines. According to the 2024 census, it has a population of 37,744 people.

== History ==
Talacogon got its name from the cogon grass that is abundant in the area. It was called so by the natives who inhabit the area before the entry of the Spanish in the Agusan River basin sometime in the 18th century. The Spanish who came in the area then adopted the name of the place as they founded it as a town in the 13th of November 1872, building a church and a town hall as commemoration to its founding. It was thus the first town founded in the riverbanks of the Agusan River and the oldest town in the province of Agusan del Sur.

As the years went on, Talacogon only experienced slow progress due to its inaccessibility and remoteness to other parts of Mindanao. It was only in the 1970s to 1990's that roads begun being built in the area from which the municipality then experienced rapid progress, due in part to facilitate the logging business in the area.

Being a town since 1872, Talacogon remains the economic center of the province west of the Agusan River.

== Geography ==
Talacogon is located at 8°27′N 125°47′E.

According to the Philippine Statistics Authority, the municipality has a land area of 405.25 square kilometres (156.47 sq mi) constituting 4.06% of the 9,989.52-square-kilometre- (3,856.98 sq mi) total area of Agusan del Sur.

=== Climate ===
Climate data for Talacogon, Agusan del Sur
Month	Jan	Feb	Mar	Apr	May	Jun	Jul	Aug	Sep	Oct	Nov	Dec	Year
Mean daily maximum °C (°F)	27 (81)	28 (82)	28 (82)	30 (86)	30 (86)	30 (86)	30 (86)	30 (86)	30 (86)	30 (86)	29 (84)	28 (82)	29 (84)
Mean daily minimum °C (°F)	23 (73)	23 (73)	22 (72)	23 (73)	24 (75)	24 (75)	24 (75)	24 (75)	24 (75)	24 (75)	23 (73)	23 (73)	23 (74)
Average precipitation mm (inches)	105 (4.1)	72 (2.8)	55 (2.2)	40 (1.6)	69 (2.7)	94 (3.7)	100 (3.9)	103 (4.1)	99 (3.9)	106 (4.2)	85 (3.3)	63 (2.5)	991 (39)
Average rainy days	17.6	16.0	14.9	14.0	20.9	24.3	25.3	25.5	24.5	24.7	19.7	16.7	244.1
Source: Meteoblue

=== Barangays ===
Talacogon is politically subdivided into 16 barangays. Each barangay consists of puroks while some have sitios.

PSGC	Barangay	Population			±% p.a.	
		2024		2010		
160311017	Batucan	5.8%	2,181	1,897	▴	0.97%
160311001	BuenaGracia	4.9%	1,846	1,657	▴	0.75%
160311002	Causwagan	8.1%	3,055	3,287	▾	−0.51%
160311004	Culi	1.4%	511	585	▾	−0.93%
160311005	Del Monte	20.5%	7,750	7,167	▴	0.54%
160311006	Desamparados	3.6%	1,361	1,498	▾	−0.66%
160311014	La Flora	3.2%	1,212	1,003	▴	1.32%
160311007	Labnig	7.7%	2,888	2,907	▾	−0.05%
160311015	Maharlika	2.3%	855	874	▾	−0.15%
160311016	Marbon	4.2%	1,570	1,658	▾	−0.38%
160311008	Sabang Gibung	2.5%	961	1,023	▾	−0.43%
160311009	San Agustin (Poblacion)	11.4%	4,314	3,948	▴	0.62%
160311010	San Isidro (Poblacion)	2.4%	897	1,114	▾	−1.49%
160311011	San Nicolas (Poblacion)	6.1%	2,307	2,519	▾	−0.61%
160311012	Zamora	3.7%	1,411	1,233	▴	0.94%
160311013	Zillovia	13.9%	5,255	4,854	▴	0.55%
	Total		37,744	37,224	▴	0.10%

== Demographics ==
Population census of Talacogon
Year	Pop.	±% p.a.
1903	2,811	—
1918	2,201	−1.62%
1939	3,242	+1.86%
1948	3,186	−0.19%
1960	4,861	+3.58%
1970	7,719	+4.73%
1975	9,110	+3.38%
1980	11,452	+4.68%
1990	21,655	+6.58%
1995	27,517	+4.59%
2000	30,879	+2.50%
2007	33,093	+0.96%
2010	37,224	+4.37%
2015	38,374	+0.58%
2020	39,678	+0.71%
2024	37,744	−1.19%
Source: Philippine Statistics Authority

In the 2024 census, Talacogon had a population of 37,744. The population density was 93 inhabitants per square kilometre (240/sq mi).

== Economy ==
Poverty incidence of Talacogon (%)

Source: Philippine Statistics Authority

== Notable people ==
- Rene Baterbonia - basketball player (Ateneo Blue Eagles, 2026), 2025 Palarong Pambansa MVP
