= Veruela =

Municipality in Agusan del Sur, Philippines

- Municipality
- Municipality of Veruela
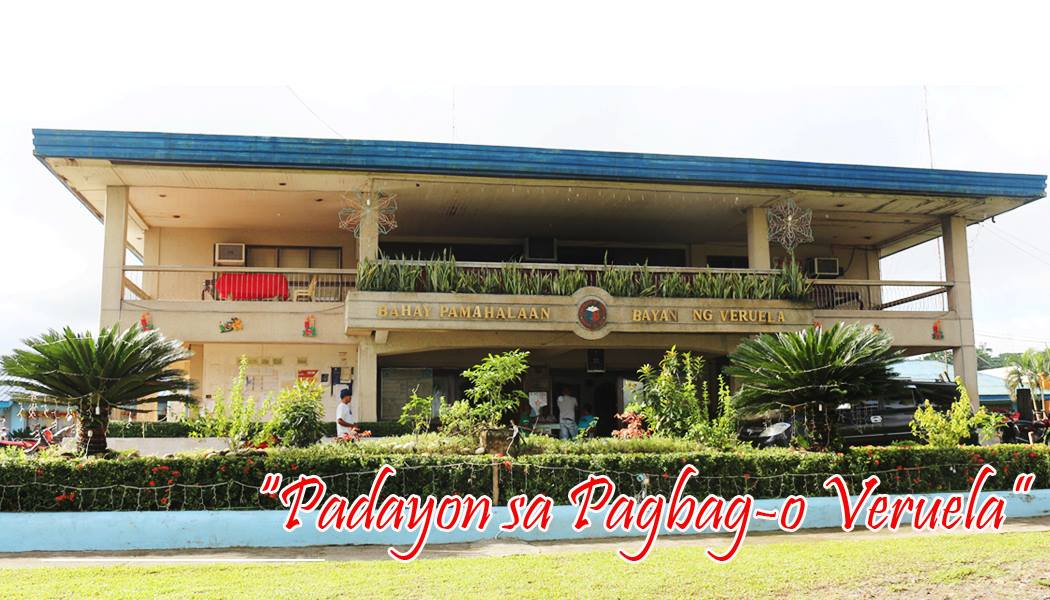
- Municipal hall

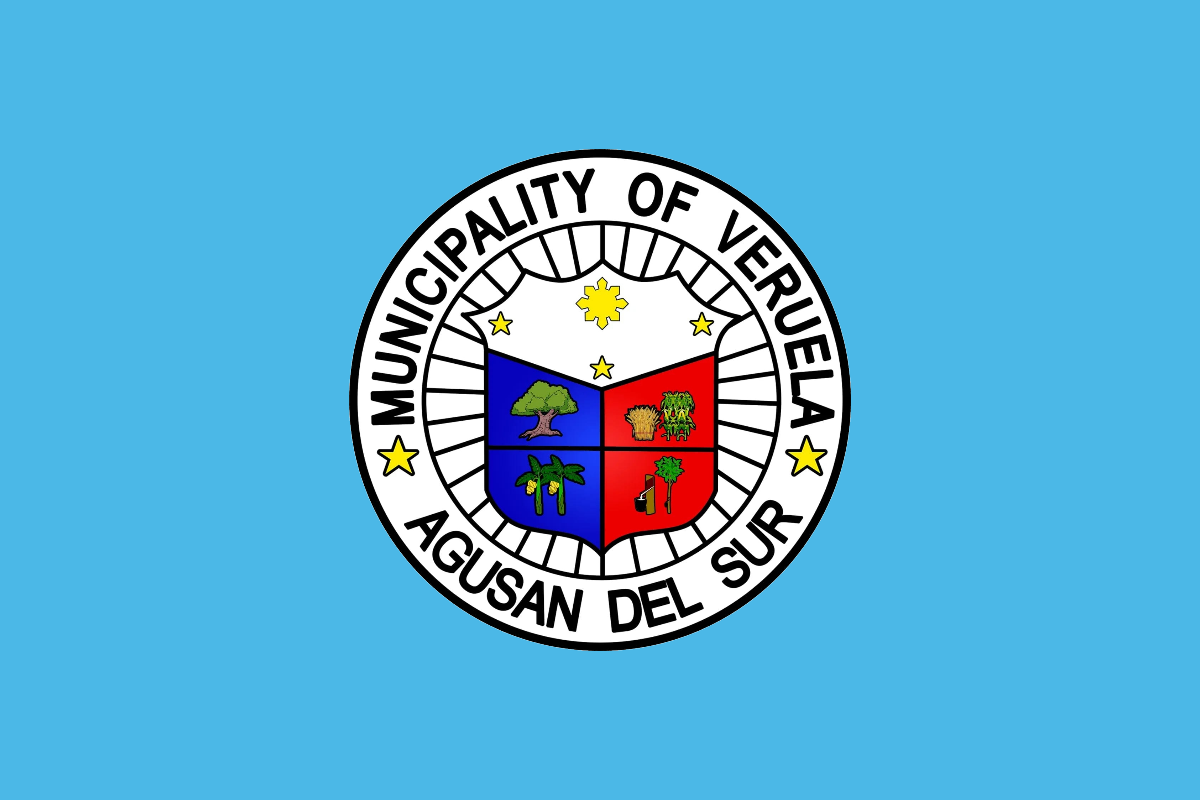
- Flag

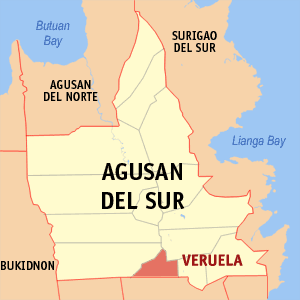
- Map of Agusan del Sur with Veruela highlighted
- Interactive map of Veruela
- Location within the Philippines
- Coordinates: 8°04′N 125°58′E
- Country: Philippines
- Region: Caraga
- Province: Agusan del Sur
- District: 2nd district
- Barangays: 20 (see Barangays)

Government
  - Type: Sangguniang Bayan
  - Mayor: Myrna S. Mondejar
  - Vice Mayor: Edgar P. Brigole
  - Representative: Adolph Edward G. Plaza
  - Electorate: 21,132 voters (2025)

Area
  - Total: 385.45 km^{2} (148.82 sq mi)
- Elevation: 39 m (128 ft)
- Highest elevation: 169 m (554 ft)
- Lowest elevation: 19 m (62 ft)

Population (2024 census)
  - Total: 43,085
  - Density: 111.78/km^{2} (289.50/sq mi)
  - Households: 9,637

Economy
  - Income class: 1st municipal income class
  - Poverty incidence: 26.65% (2023)
  - Revenue: ₱ 254.7 million (2024)
  - Assets: ₱ 712.7 million (2024)
  - Expenditure: ₱ 231 million (2024)
  - Liabilities: ₱ 404.7 million (2024)

Service provider
  - Electricity: Agusan del Sur Electric Cooperative (ASELCO)
- Time zone: UTC+8 (PST)
- ZIP code: 8509
- PSGC: 1600313000
- IDD : area code: +63 (0)85
- Native languages: Agusan; Butuanon; Cebuano; Higaonon; Tagalog
- Website: www.veruela.gov.ph

Veruela, officially the Municipality of Veruela (Cebuano: Lungsod sa Veruela; Tagalog: Bayan ng Veruela), is a municipality in the province of Agusan del Sur, Philippines. According to the 2024 census, it has a population of 43,085 people.

== History ==
Veruela is considered the oldest town of upper Agusan del Sur. It is believed the name "Veruela" derives from the word "virus", as the area suffered from smallpox and cholera in the late 18th century when Spanish missionaries encountered the indigenous Manobo tribes.

The Manobo later moved to Manning, also known as Linongsuran, along the Agusan River. In 1916, an earthquake destroyed the settlement, forcing the survivors to evacuate and reorganize themselves into another place, now the barangay poblacion of the municipality.

In the 18th century, Muslim tribes in Davao invaded the Manobos in Agusan, and the two sides fought. The first known leader of the Manobo was the datu Eladio Manguyod, who drove the Muslims out after a hard-fought battle. During this period, the tribe converted to Christianity and adopted Saint John as their patron.

Veruela became a municipality through Executive Order No. 147, which was proclaimed by President Diosdado Macapagal on March 31, 1965 during the term of Congressman Guillermo Sanchez, who once also served as mayor of the town. Since its formal creation as a municipality, Veruela has seen eight different administrations.

The municipality of Veruela has a silent dispute with the nearby province of Compostela Valley regarding the boundary between the two in Barangay Del Monte.

== Geography ==
Veruela is located at 8°04′N 125°58′E.

According to the Philippine Statistics Authority, the municipality has a land area of 385.45 square kilometres (148.82 sq mi) constituting 3.86% of the 9,989.52-square-kilometre- (3,856.98 sq mi) total area of Agusan del Sur.

=== Climate ===
Climate data for Veruela, Agusan del Sur
Month	Jan	Feb	Mar	Apr	May	Jun	Jul	Aug	Sep	Oct	Nov	Dec	Year
Mean daily maximum °C (°F)	27 (81)	27 (81)	27 (81)	29 (84)	29 (84)	29 (84)	30 (86)	30 (86)	30 (86)	30 (86)	29 (84)	28 (82)	29 (84)
Mean daily minimum °C (°F)	22 (72)	22 (72)	22 (72)	23 (73)	23 (73)	23 (73)	23 (73)	23 (73)	23 (73)	23 (73)	23 (73)	22 (72)	23 (73)
Average precipitation mm (inches)	105 (4.1)	80 (3.1)	58 (2.3)	39 (1.5)	62 (2.4)	75 (3.0)	69 (2.7)	62 (2.4)	59 (2.3)	71 (2.8)	69 (2.7)	69 (2.7)	818 (32)
Average rainy days	15.8	15.4	14.8	13.8	19.7	22.5	22.9	22.7	22.0	23.0	18.1	15.0	225.7
Source: Meteoblue

=== Barangays ===
Veruela is politically subdivided into 20 barangays. Each barangay consists of puroks while some have sitios.

PSGC	Barangay	Population			±% p.a.	
		2024		2010		
160313013	Anitap	1.4%	595	560	▴	0.42%
160313014	Bacay II	2.5%	1,085	994	▴	0.61%
160313001	Binongan	4.0%	1,735	1,477	▴	1.12%
160313015	Caigangan	2.4%	1,029	726	▴	2.45%
160313016	Candiis	1.5%	655	553	▴	1.18%
160313002	Del Monte	5.5%	2,375	2,260	▴	0.34%
160313003	Don Mateo	3.4%	1,452	1,269	▴	0.94%
160313017	Katipunan	2.2%	958	922	▴	0.27%
160313004	La Fortuna	14.9%	6,418	6,045	▴	0.42%
160313005	Limot	2.3%	973	1,104	▾	−0.87%
160313006	Magsaysay	3.8%	1,628	1,563	▴	0.28%
160313007	Masayan	4.0%	1,726	1,430	▴	1.31%
160313008	Poblacion	13.7%	5,891	5,643	▴	0.30%
160313009	Sampaguita	13.8%	5,950	5,581	▴	0.45%
160313010	San Gabriel	6.0%	2,569	2,115	▴	1.36%
160313018	Santa Cruz	2.5%	1,059	1,021	▴	0.25%
160313011	Santa Emelia	3.4%	1,483	1,463	▴	0.09%
160313019	Sawagan	2.6%	1,099	1,214	▾	−0.69%
160313012	Sinobong	8.6%	3,706	3,206	▴	1.01%
160313020	Sisimon	3.1%	1,320	1,311	▴	0.05%
	Total		43,085	40,457	▴	0.44%

== Demographics ==
Population census of Veruela
Year	Pop.	±% p.a.
1903	2,623	—
1918	1,522	−3.56%
1939	1,381	−0.46%
1948	1,528	+1.13%
1960	2,914	+5.53%
1970	6,626	+8.55%
1975	9,915	+8.42%
1980	13,991	+7.13%
1990	20,129	+3.71%
1995	35,706	+11.34%
2000	36,222	+0.31%
2007	36,862	+0.24%
2010	40,457	+3.44%
2015	43,706	+1.48%
2020	39,708	−2.00%
2024	43,085	+1.98%
Source: Philippine Statistics Authority

In the 2024 census, Veruela had a population of 43,085. The population density was 110 inhabitants per square kilometre (280/sq mi).

== Economy ==
Poverty incidence of Veruela (%)

Source: Philippine Statistics Authority
