= La Paz, Agusan del Sur =

Municipality in the Philippines

La Paz
- Municipality
- Municipality of La Paz
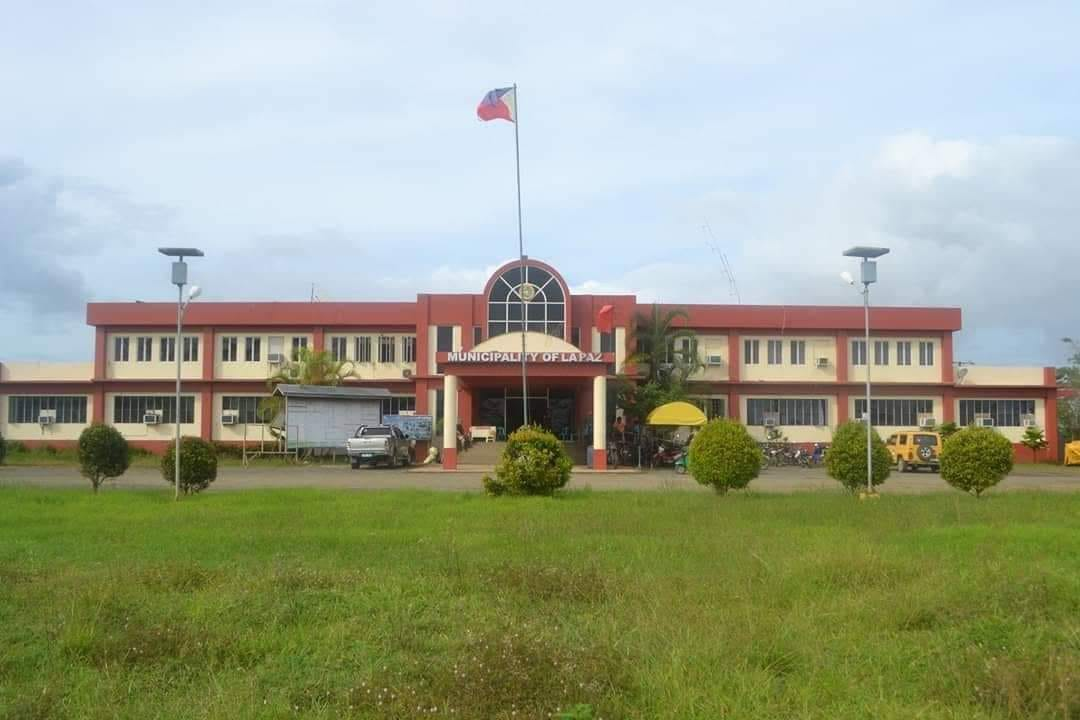
- Municipal hall

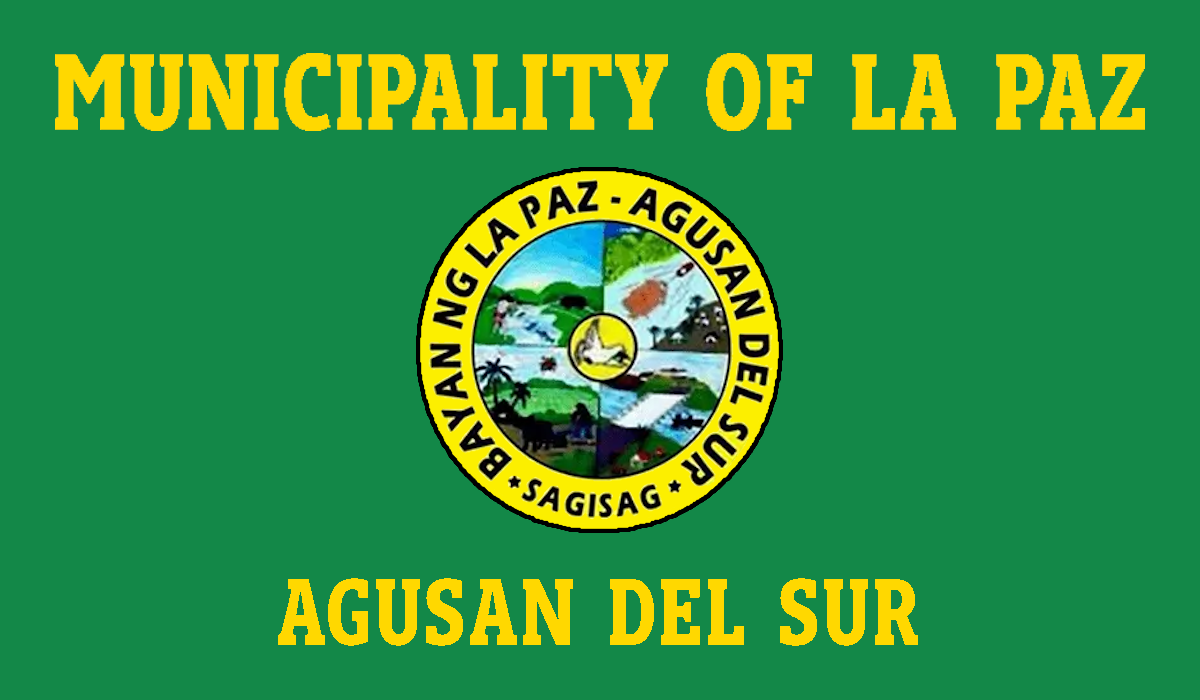
- Flag

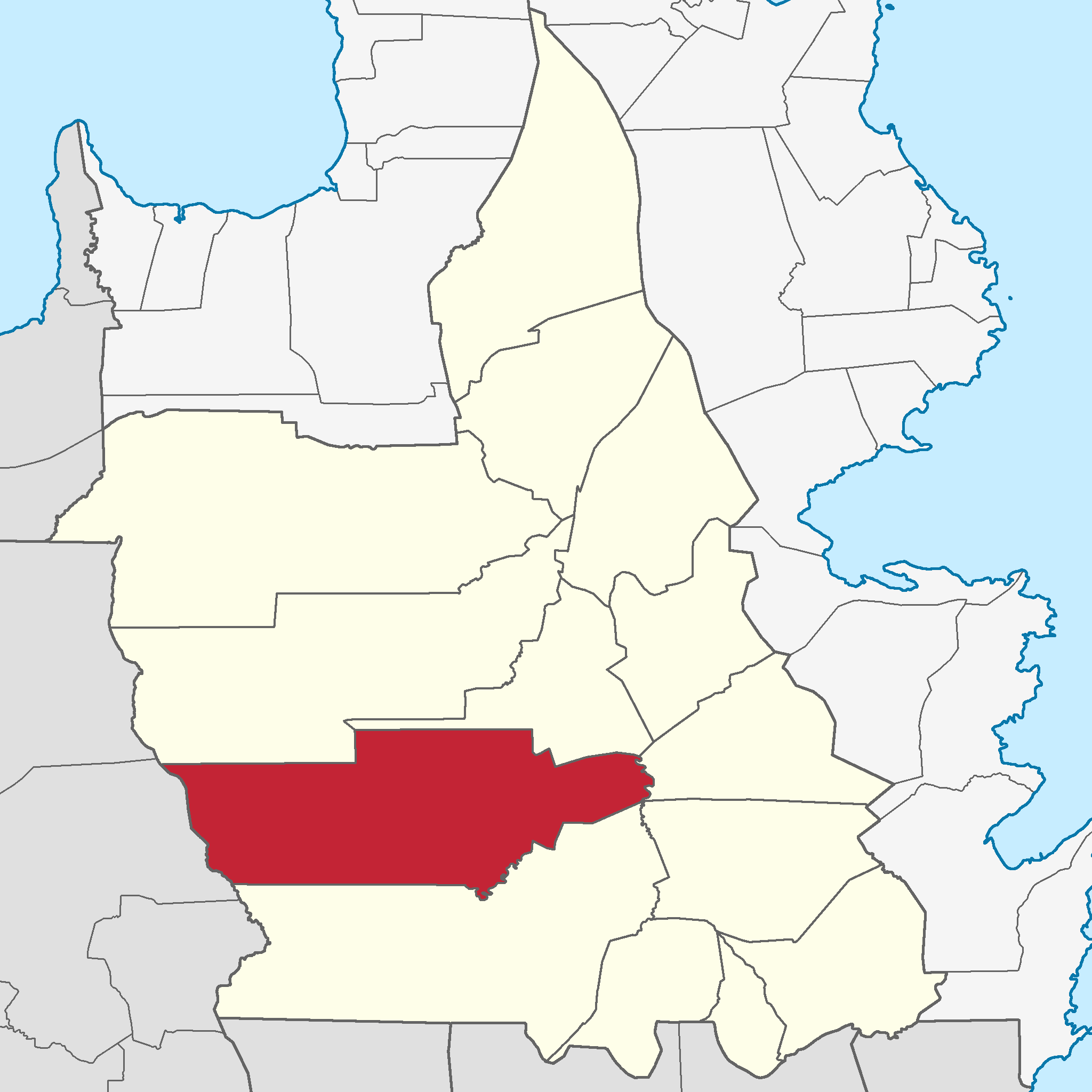
- Map of Agusan del Sur with La Paz highlighted
- Interactive map of La Paz
- Location within the Philippines
- Coordinates: 8°17′N 125°49′E
- Country: Philippines
- Region: Caraga
- Province: Agusan del Sur
- District: 2nd district
- Founded: March 31, 1965
- Barangays: 15 (see Barangays)

Government
  - Type: Sangguniang Bayan
  - Mayor: Michael D. Lim
  - Vice Mayor: Albert A. Justo
  - Representative: Adolph Edward G. Plaza
  - Electorate: 23,824 voters (2025)

Area
  - Total: 1,481.12 km^{2} (571.86 sq mi)
- Elevation: 327 m (1,073 ft)
- Highest elevation: 1,666 m (5,466 ft)
- Lowest elevation: 14 m (46 ft)

Population (2024 census)
  - Total: 29,096
  - Density: 19.645/km^{2} (50.879/sq mi)
  - Households: 6,583
- Demonym: Pacificador(-a)

Economy
  - Income class: 1st municipal income class
  - Poverty incidence: 46.04% (2023)
  - Revenue: ₱ 501.6 million (2024)
  - Assets: ₱ 1,818 million (2024)
  - Expenditure: ₱ 521.6 million (2024)
  - Liabilities: ₱ 1,220 million (2024)

Service provider
  - Electricity: Agusan del Sur Electric Cooperative (ASELCO)
- Time zone: UTC+8 (PST)
- ZIP code: 8508
- PSGC: 1600304000
- IDD : area code: +63 (0)85
- Native languages: Agusan; Butuanon; Cebuano; Higaonon; Tagalog

La Paz, officially the Municipality of La Paz (Cebuano: Lungsod sa La Paz; Tagalog: Bayan ng La Paz), is a municipality in the province of Agusan del Sur in the Caraga of the Philippines. The population was 29,096 at the 2024 census. La Paz is the largest town in terms of land area in Agusan del Sur and the entire Mindanao.

== Geography ==
La Paz is located at 8.28°N 125.81°E.

According to the Philippine Statistics Authority, the municipality has a land area of 1,481.12 square kilometres (571.86 sq mi) constituting 14.83% of the 9,989.52-square-kilometre- (3,856.98 sq mi) total area of Agusan del Sur. Which makes it the largest municipality in Mindanao in term of land area.

=== Climate ===
Climate data for La Paz, Agusan del Sur
Month	Jan	Feb	Mar	Apr	May	Jun	Jul	Aug	Sep	Oct	Nov	Dec	Year
Mean daily maximum °C (°F)	27 (81)	27 (81)	28 (82)	30 (86)	30 (86)	30 (86)	30 (86)	30 (86)	30 (86)	30 (86)	29 (84)	28 (82)	29 (84)
Mean daily minimum °C (°F)	23 (73)	23 (73)	22 (72)	23 (73)	24 (75)	24 (75)	24 (75)	24 (75)	24 (75)	24 (75)	23 (73)	23 (73)	23 (74)
Average precipitation mm (inches)	105 (4.1)	72 (2.8)	55 (2.2)	40 (1.6)	69 (2.7)	94 (3.7)	100 (3.9)	103 (4.1)	99 (3.9)	106 (4.2)	85 (3.3)	63 (2.5)	991 (39)
Average rainy days	17.6	16.0	14.9	14.0	20.9	24.3	25.3	25.5	24.5	24.7	19.7	16.7	244.1
Source: Meteoblue

=== Barangays ===
La Paz is politically subdivided into 15 barangays. Each barangay consists of puroks while some have sitios.

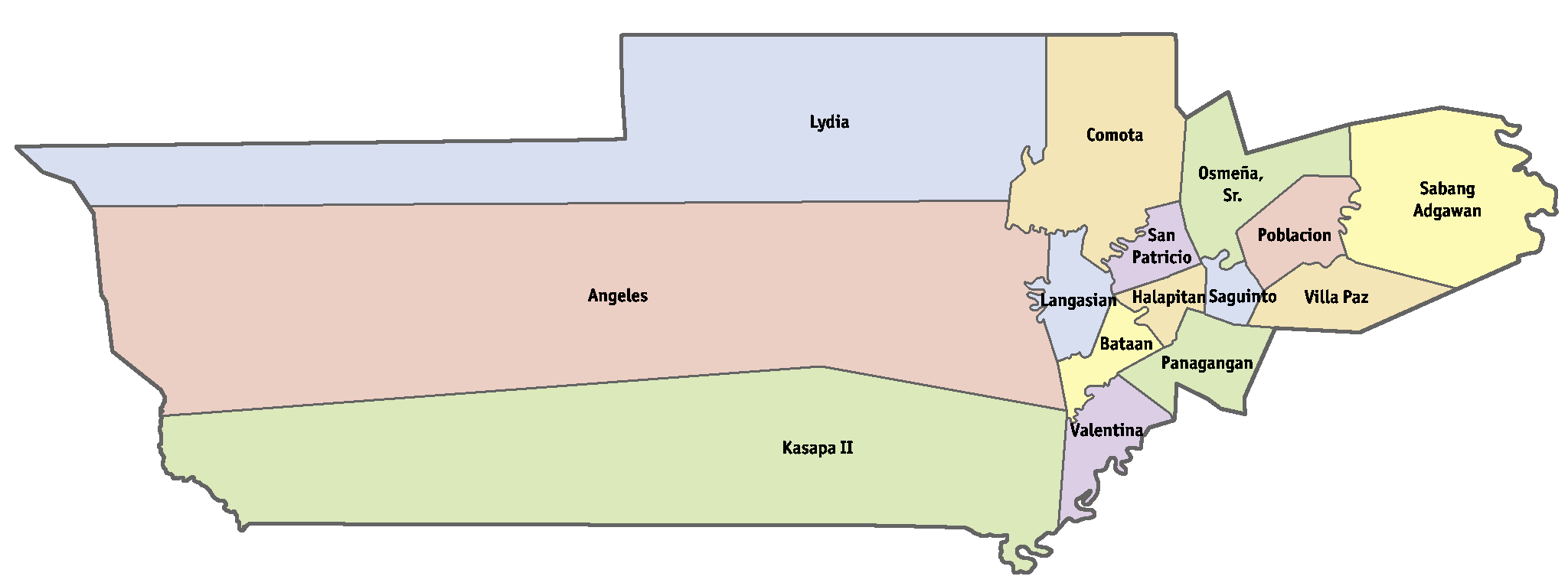
Political map of La Paz

PSGC	Barangay	Population			±% p.a.	
		2024		2010		
160304009	Angeles	2.8%	823	1,039	▾	−1.60%
160304001	Bataan	6.5%	1,893	1,685	▴	0.81%
160304002	Comota	5.6%	1,641	2,046	▾	−1.52%
160304003	Halapitan	1.7%	508	639	▾	−1.58%
160304010	Kasapa II	4.8%	1,398	1,391	▴	0.03%
160304004	Langasian	4.2%	1,233	1,083	▴	0.90%
160304011	Lydia	5.0%	1,465	1,579	▾	−0.52%
160304005	Osmeña, Sr.	6.3%	1,827	1,553	▴	1.13%
160304012	Panagangan	12.2%	3,549	3,319	▴	0.46%
160304006	Poblacion	19.1%	5,563	4,977	▴	0.77%
160304013	Sabang Adgawan	5.2%	1,505	1,667	▾	−0.71%
160304007	Sagunto	5.8%	1,677	1,847	▾	−0.67%
160304014	San Patricio	5.1%	1,476	1,358	▴	0.58%
160304015	Valentina	6.7%	1,942	2,560	▾	−1.89%
160304008	Villa Paz	5.9%	1,717	1,819	▾	−0.40%
	Total		29,096	28,562	▴	0.13%

== Demographics ==
Population census of La Paz
Year	Pop.	±% p.a.
1918	908	—
1939	2,418	+4.77%
1948	2,701	+1.24%
1960	5,746	+6.49%
1970	7,971	+3.32%
1975	12,634	+9.68%
1980	14,389	+2.63%
1990	16,144	+1.16%
1995	23,044	+6.90%
2000	20,880	−2.09%
2007	25,214	+2.64%
2010	28,562	+4.64%
2015	28,217	−0.23%
2020	30,969	+1.98%
2024	29,096	−1.49%
Source: Philippine Statistics Authority

In the 2024 census, La Paz had a population of 29,096. The population density was 20 inhabitants per square kilometre (52/sq mi).

== Economy ==
Poverty incidence of La Paz (%)

Source: Philippine Statistics Authority
