= Gum Tree =

Gum Tree may refer to:

- Gum tree, the common name of several species of tree
- Gumtree, (gumtree.com) a UK-based online classified advertisement and community website
- Gumtree Australia, an Australia-based online classified advertisement and community website
- GumTree, open-source scientific software for performing scientific experiments
- Gum Tree, Kentucky, a place in the U.S.
- USS Gum Tree, a net laying ship
