= DXAK-FM =

Bio Radio (DXAK)
Bunawan; Philippines
- Broadcast area: Southeastern Caraga and surrounding areas
- Frequency: 99.9 MHz
- Branding: 99.9 Bio Radio

Programming
- Languages: Cebuano, Filipino
- Format: Community radio

Ownership
- Owner: Karaga Biodiversity Linkages

History
- First air date: 1998

Technical information
- Power: 5,000 Watts

DXAK (99.9 FM), broadcasting as 99.9 Bio Radio, is a radio station in the Philippines owned and operated by Karaga Biodiversity Linkages (KABILIN). Its studio and transmitter are located inside the Agusan del Sur State College of Agriculture and Technology campus, Bunawan.
