= Green iguana in captivity =

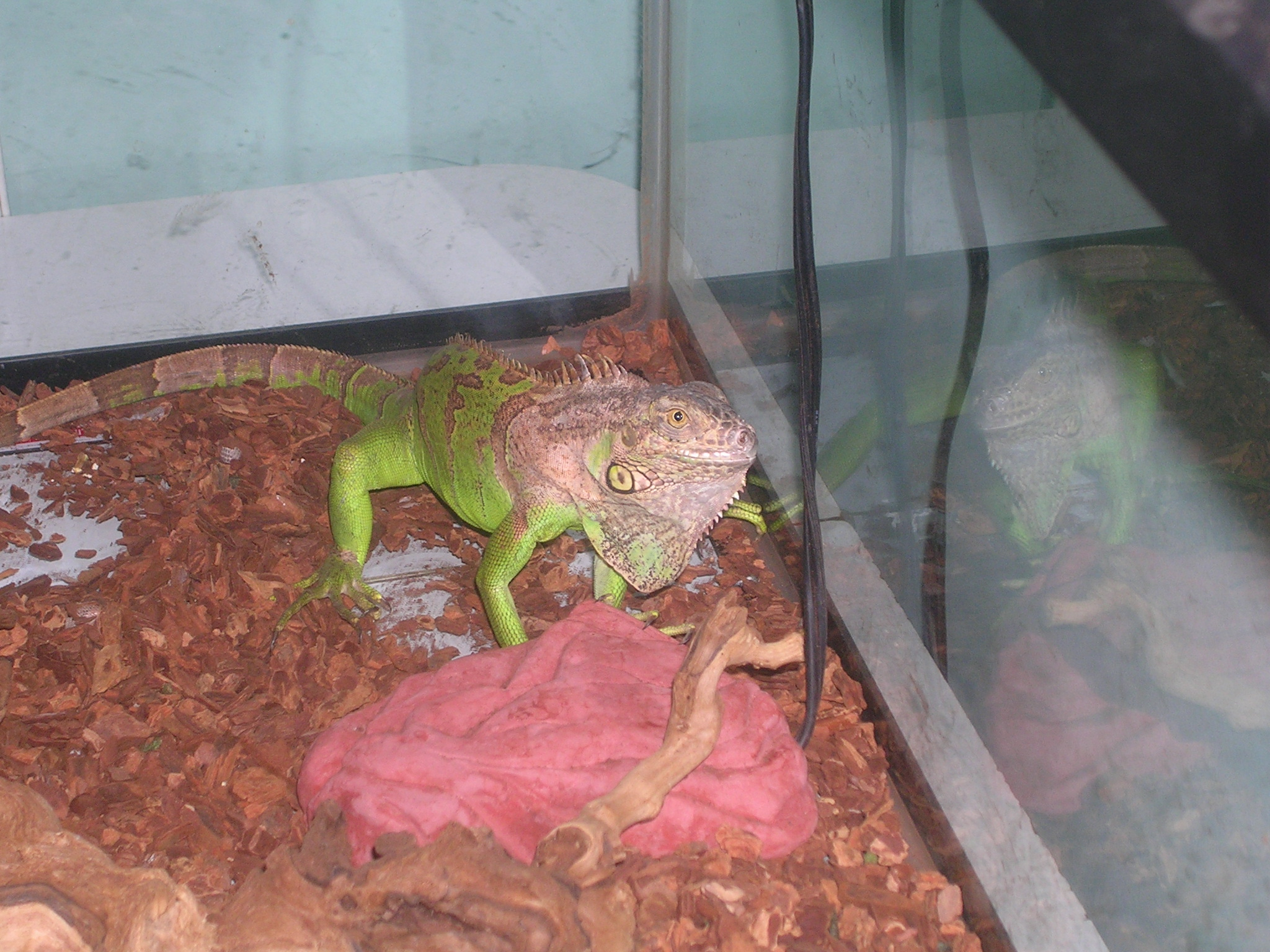
A young green iguana in a glass enclosure with a "hot rock" heating device

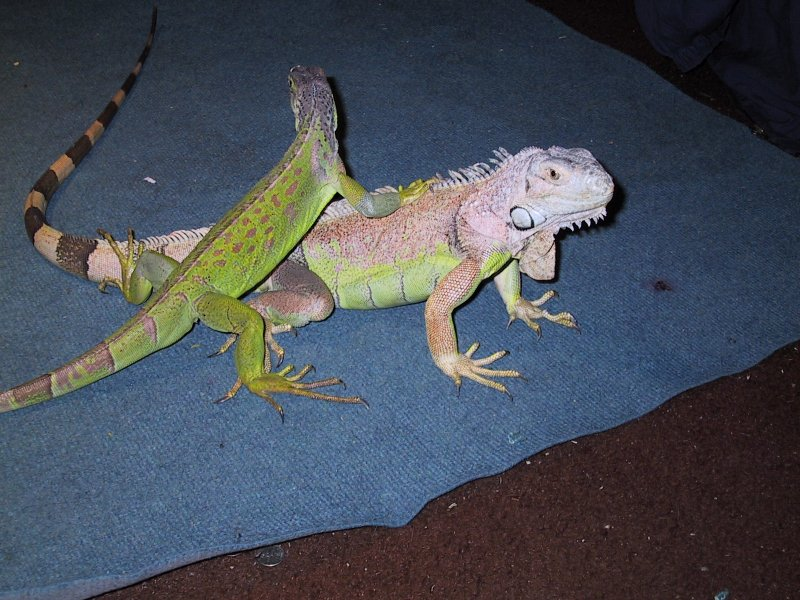
A juvenile and smaller immature iguana in captivity

The green iguana (Iguana iguana) is the most globally traded reptile representing 46% of the total reptile trade in the US from 1996 and 2012, with annual imports reaching 1 million in 1996. In 1995, there were over 800,000 animals were imported into the United States alone, primarily originating from captive farming operations based in their native countries (Honduras, El Salvador, Colombia, and Panama).The green iguana has also seen a surge of importation in the Greater Caribbean Region. A study done on invasive iguanas in Puerto Rico found that the sample population were mostly the product of populations originating from Columbia and El Salvador. Both countries contain several industrial-size pet iguana farming operations.

In 1998 a National Iguana Awareness Day (NIAD) was established to discourage consumers from viewing iguanas as "disposable pets". Despite the low cost and "mass market" appeal of these animals they are demanding to care for properly over the course of their lifetimes. More often than not, diet, lighting, and other housing conditions for green iguana are inadequate, causing 70% of green iguanas in captivity to die within their first year of life.

== Size ==
People purchase iguanas due to the small size, low price, and apparent low cost of feeding of juvenile iguanas. Though small as juveniles, iguanas can grow to 6 feet in length and weigh about 20 pounds. Green iguanas have also been noted to live up to 20 years in captivity. An iguana will not grow properly without a UVB light source. The UVB is necessary because captive iguanas do not get natural sunlight and this UVB allows the iguana to make vitamin D3. The purpose of vitamin D3 is to absorb calcium. Without being able to absorb calcium, the iguana develops Metabolic Bone Disease (MBD). Metabolic Bone Disease causes soft bones, stunted growth, permanent bone deformities, frequent broken bones, loss of limbs and ultimately, death.

== Diet ==
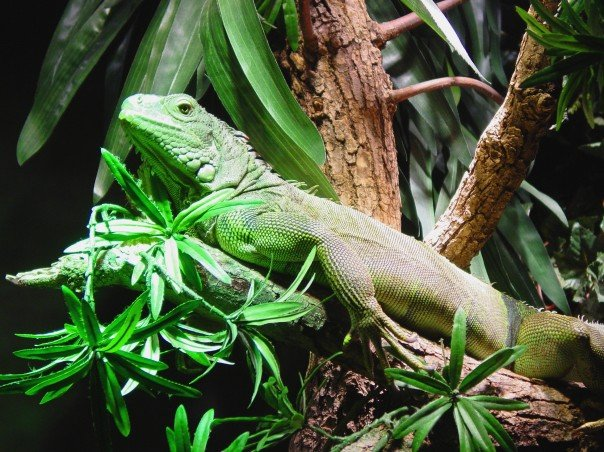
An iguana at the Henry Vilas Zoo, Madison, Wisconsin

Although they will consume a wide variety of foods if offered, green iguanas are naturally herbivorous and require a precise ratio of minerals (2 to 1 calcium to phosphorus) in their diet. The best food source for the Iguana is dark green leafy greens such as collard greens, turnip greens, dandelion greens and small portions of kale, which is too high in phosphorus for everyday use. Hibiscus flowers and dandelions may also be added. The diet needs to be a greater percentage of dark greens, moderate amount of squash, and less of fruits. Some of the most accessible staple vegetables, greens, and fruit are collard greens, Turnip Greens, Kale, Parsnip, Butternut squash, Tomato, Mango, Blueberries, Watermelon, and an occasional Apple or Banana slice and Watercress as a treat. Also of concern is the oxalate to calcium ratio, and avoiding those that provide too much oxalate which is harmful. Foods high in oxalate that should not be given for an everyday diet include broccoli, carrots, snap peas, okra, sweet potato, and romaine lettuce. An Iguana should never be fed iceberg lettuce or spinach.

There is some debate as to whether captive green iguanas should be fed animal protein. Zoologists, such as Adam Britton, believe that such a diet containing protein is unhealthy for the animal's digestive system resulting in severe long-term health damage and death. On the other side of the argument is that Green iguanas at the Miami Seaquarium in Key Biscayne, Florida, have been observed eating dead fish and individuals kept in captivity have been known to eat mice without any ill effects. De Vosjoli also writes that some animals have been known to survive and thrive on eating nothing but whole rodent block, or monkey chow, and one instance of Romaine lettuce with vitamin and calcium supplements. However, just because an Iguana will eat certain foods it does not mean this is what's best for it. A protein or lettuce diet will greatly shorten the Iguana's life and for this reason should be avoided.

== Heat and light ==
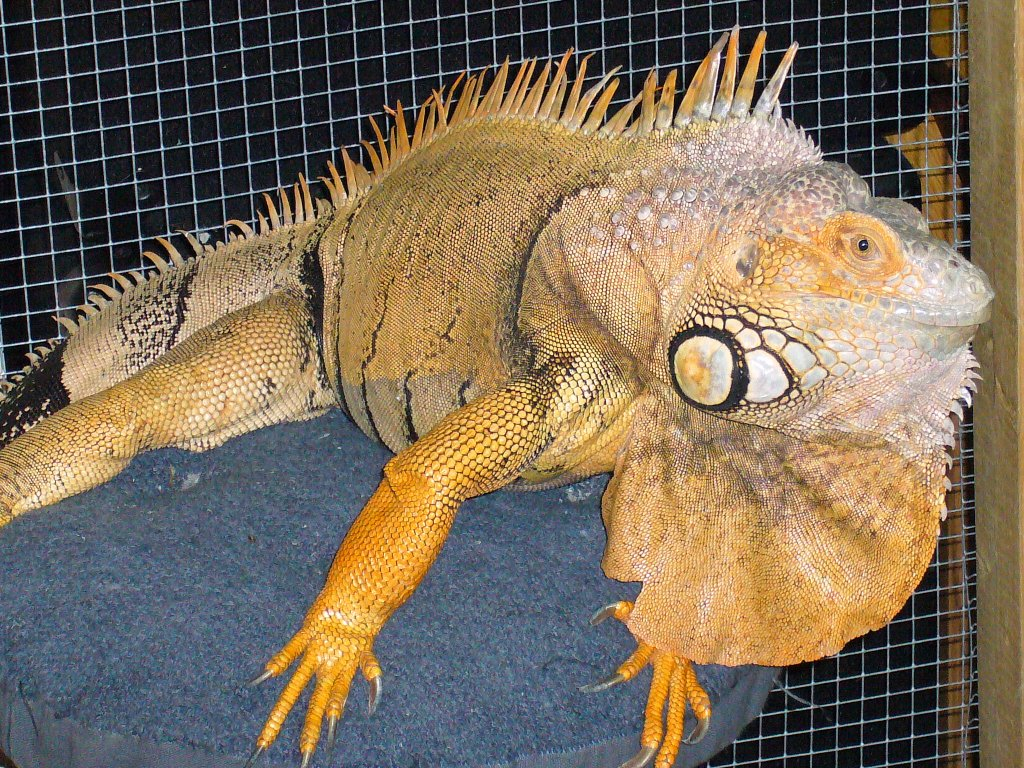
A Green Iguana resting on a trunk

Being tropical animals, Green iguanas will thrive only in temperatures of 75 to 95 degrees Fahrenheit (24 to 32 degrees Celsius) They require a source of Ultraviolet (UVA and UVB) lighting; without proper lighting their bodies cannot develop Vitamin D, and subsequently will develop metabolic bone disease which is fatal if not treated.

== Legalities ==
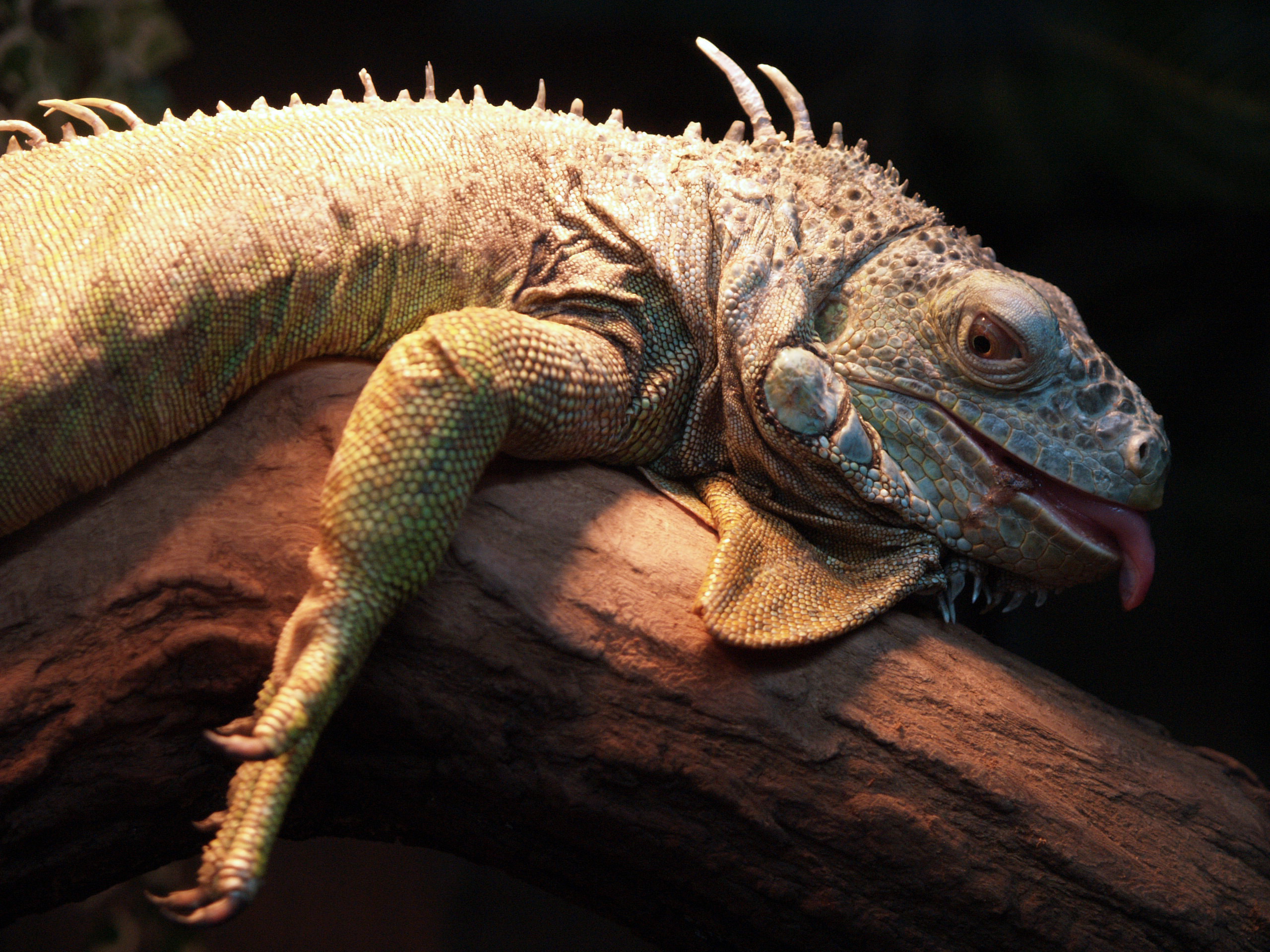
An old, male green iguana

In some locales, iguanas are considered exotic pets, and may be prohibited (New York City and Hawaii), or a special license or permit may be needed to own an iguana. Hawaii has strict regulations regarding the import and possession of Green iguanas, violators can spend three years in jail and fined up to $200,000.

== Invasiveness ==
Green iguanas are considered an invasive species in South Florida and along the gulf coast of Florida from Key West to Pinellas County. Additionally, Hawaii, Texas, and Puerto Rico have labeled these animals as invasive as well. Over the years escaped and intentionally released iguanas from the pet trade survived and then thrived in their new habitat. The burrowing nature of these reptiles pose a threat to infrastructure as well as the potential to displace native species, such as the Florida Burrowing Owl and gopher tortoise. Green iguanas are known to damage residential and commercial landscape vegetation through their large appetite. In Florida, the iguanas have been known to eat the endangered tree snail as well as the host plants for the Miami Blue butterfly.

They commonly hide in the attics of houses and on beaches and destroy gardens and landscaping. As reptiles can carry salmonella and other bacteria, combined with destruction of fragile native threatened and endangered species and habitats in the unique environment of the Florida Keys, many advocate for legislation to regulate the trade in iguanas and advocate their eradication in the wild.

The Florida Fish and Wildlife Conservation Commission allows for the humane killing of green iguanas on private property. Additionally, citizens take steps to deter the iguana from damaging and entering their property through the removal of attracting plants, filling holes to eliminate burrowing, hanging wind chimes for noise deterrent, and displaying CDs to reflect potential intruders. Florida has recognized the green iguana as a prohibited species that can no longer be kept as a pet without a permit.

== Socialization and habitat ==
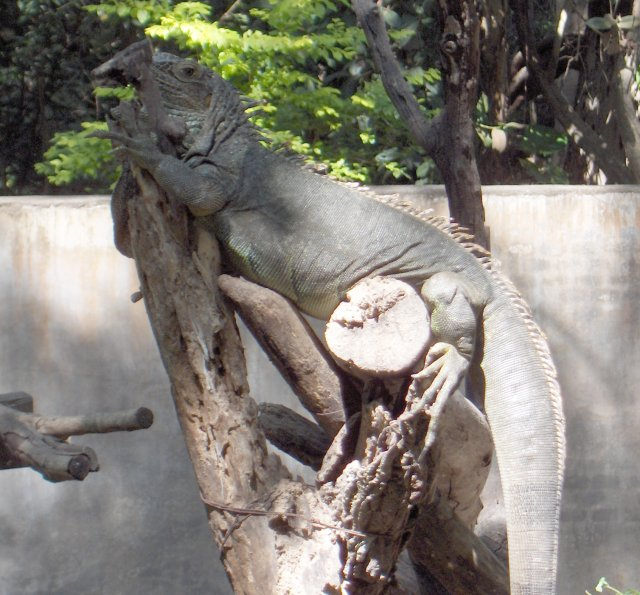
Green Iguana in captivity

Socialization of an iguana may take several years. Iguanas have individual personalities that require some adaptation on the part of the owner. At about five to ten years, an iguana may exhibit bonding behavior similar to that of mammalian pets. Such an iguana may have a complex "need of attachment" to include separation anxiety.

Without frequent handling and socializing, these reptiles can become hostile to interact with. Their large tails and sharp teeth also pose a potential threat to their owners. Financial factors relating to diet and habitat needs are also difficult aspects to owning such lizards. Green iguanas require both time and commitment to raise successfully.

== As pets ==
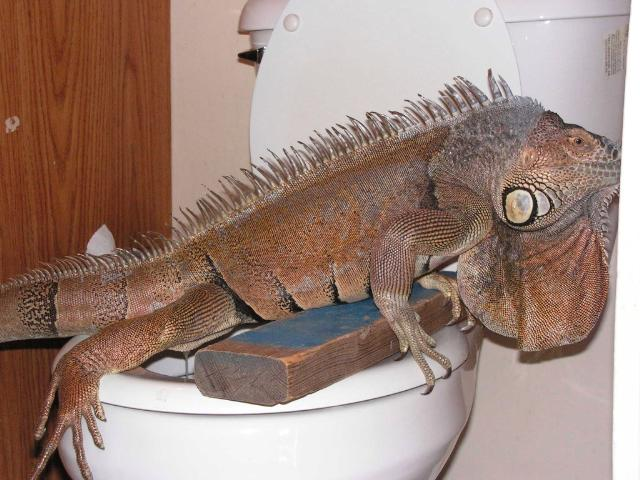
A toilet trained iguana

Green iguanas are not suitable lizards for beginners. A pet iguana habituates to humans to such a degree that humans no longer cause a fight-or-flight response. Iguanas achieve this after they have acclimated to their new habitat, as well as brief but constant interaction with their owner. Fiji banded iguanas are a better iguanid option for less-experienced pet owners because they are smaller and less aggressive; however, they still need specialist care.

Healthy pet iguanas are very observant, confident, and curious. Iguanas can be "potty-trained" to go outside (when it is warm), go in a specific location (as on newspaper) or in a tub of warm water (and even on the toilet). Green iguanas are diurnal and possess excellent climbing and swimming abilities

Most veterinarians do not have the training to treat an iguana, making treatment difficult to procure, expensive, or both.
