= Lolong =

Largest saltwater crocodile held in captivity

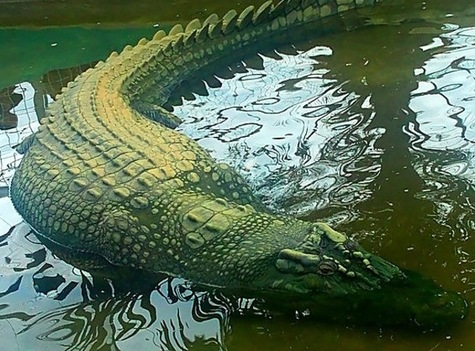
- A photograph of Lolong during captivity
- Species: Crocodylus porosus (Saltwater crocodile)
- Sex: Male
- Hatched: c. 1955 – c. 1960
- Died: February 10, 2013; Bunawan, Agusan del Sur, Philippines
- Resting place: National Museum of Natural History, Manila
- Known for: Guinness World Record "world's largest crocodile in captivity"
- Weight: 1075 kg (2,370 lb)

Lolong (died 10 February 2013) was the largest crocodile ever held in captivity. He was a saltwater crocodile (Crocodylus porosus) measured at 6.17 m (20 ft 3 in), making him one of the largest crocodiles ever measured from snout to tail, and weighing 1,075 kg (2,370 lb).

In November 2011, British crocodile expert Adam Britton of National Geographic sedated and measured Lolong in his enclosure and confirmed him as the world's largest crocodile ever caught and placed in captivity.

Lolong died from pneumonia and cardiac arrest, after a little over one year and five months in captivity.

== Capture and habitat ==
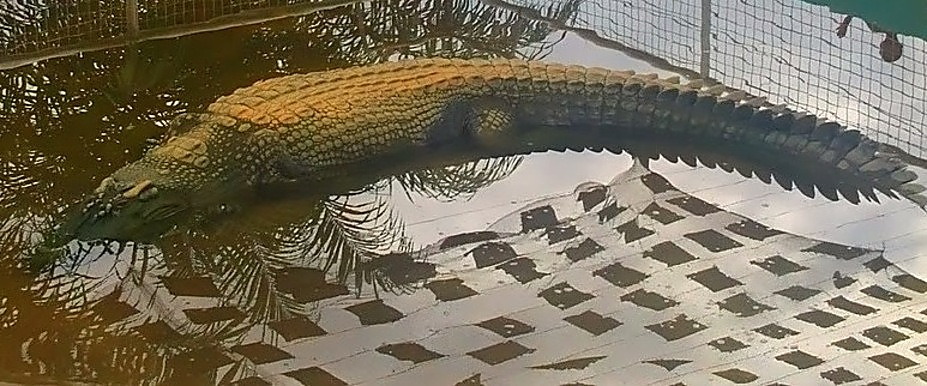
Lolong in captivity.

Lolong was caught in a Bunawan creek in the province of Agusan del Sur in the Philippines on 3 September 2011. He was captured with the joint cooperation of the local government unit, residents, and crocodile hunters of Palawan in the Philippines, along with the help of Kim Ramos, who happened to be a crocodile expert curious after hearing the story of Rowena Romano.

Hunted over a period of three weeks, it took around 100 people to bring him onto land. He became aggressive at several points during the capture, and twice broke restraining ropes before eventually being properly secured. He was estimated to be at least 50 years old.

Lolong was first suspected of eating a fisherman who went missing in the town of Bunawan, and also of consuming a 10-year-old girl whose headless body was discovered two years earlier. However, disagreement and speculation grew after Lolong's capture that an even larger alleged 24–29 ft (7.3–8.8 m) crocodile, nicknamed 'Potol', was responsible for the attacks. Lolong was also the primary suspect in the disappearance of water buffaloes in the known area. During the examination of the stomach contents after his capture, no human remains or remnants of water buffaloes reported missing before Lolong's capture were found.

The nongovernmental organization activist Animal Kingdom Foundation Inc., with the cooperation of People for the Ethical Treatment of Animals, had urged the local government of Bunawan to return Lolong to the creek of barangay Nueva Era, where the giant reptile was captured. However, in an ongoing debate, Bunawan mayor Edwin "Cox" Elorde and residents of the barangay opposed the crocodile's release, arguing that Lolong would threaten individuals living in the vicinity of the creek.

== Name ==
The crocodile was named after Ernesto "Lolong" Goloran Coñate, one of the veteran crocodile hunters from the Palawan Crocodile and Wildlife Reservation Center, who led the hunt. After weeks of stalking, the hunt for Lolong took its toll on Coñate's health. He died of a heart attack several days before the crocodile was captured.

== Captivity and display ==
Bunawan made Lolong the centerpiece of an ecotourism park for species found in the marshlands near the township. Mayor Elorde said, "We will take care of this crocodile because this will boost our tourism and we know it can help in terms of town's income and jobs to our village communities."

The ecopark charged a ₱20 entrance fee for adults and ₱15 for children, which supported the park's maintenance and procurement of Lolong's food. The Bunawan Ecopark also incurred expenses for electricity, maintenance, and other incidental expenses, such as installation of CCTV cameras. According to Bunawan Mayor Elorde, up to 26 October 2011, the celebrity crocodile had already earned nearly half million pesos in donations, entrance fees, and parking fees, with a daily income of about ₱10,000 that month.

== Record holder ==
In June 2012, six months after Australian zoologist and crocodile expert Dr. Adam Britton gathered measurements, Lolong was officially certified by the Guinness Book of World Records as the "world's largest crocodile in captivity" at 6.17 m (20 ft 3 in). Experts from the National Geographic Channel found that Lolong had broken the record of the previous record-holder: a 5.48 m (18 ft 0 in) male saltwater crocodile named Cassius kept in the crocodile park of MarineLand Melanesia in Queensland, Australia. The certification was read in public during Bunawan's annual local festival, Araw Ng Bunawan (Bunawan Day).

== Bunawan Ecopark and Research Center plans ==
Bunawan Municipal Planning & Development Officer Robert Floyd Salise, told PNA in an interview that the project will include the construction of cottages, lodging houses or inns, swimming pools, an amphitheatre, laboratory and research center, souvenir shops, pavilion, and other amenities.

== Death and storage of remains ==
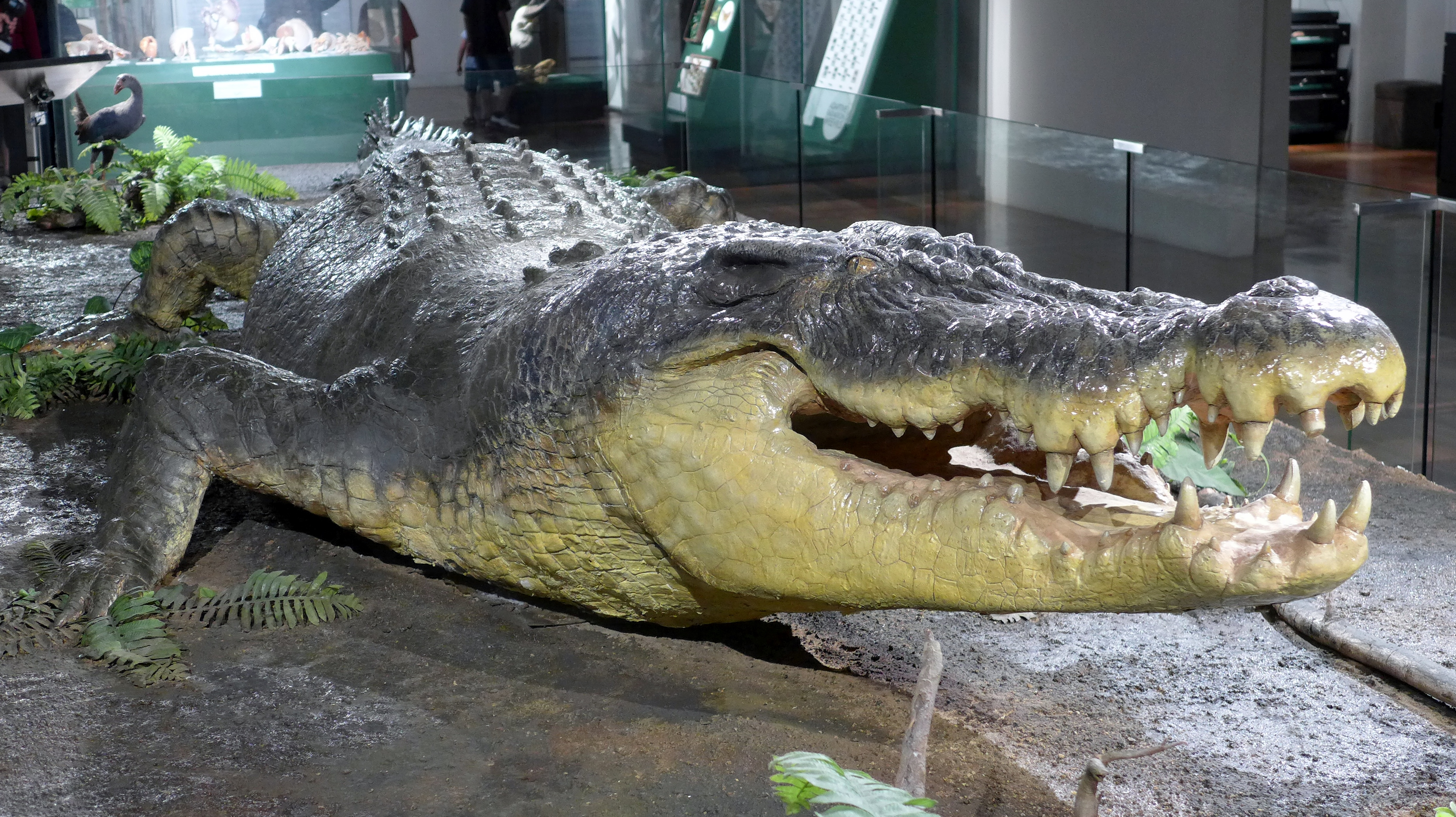
Taxidermied skin of Lolong at National Museum of the Philippines

Lolong was found dead inside his compound at around 8:00 p.m. on 10 February 2013. The necropsy revealed he had died of pneumonia and cardiac arrest, which was aggravated by a fungal infection and stress.

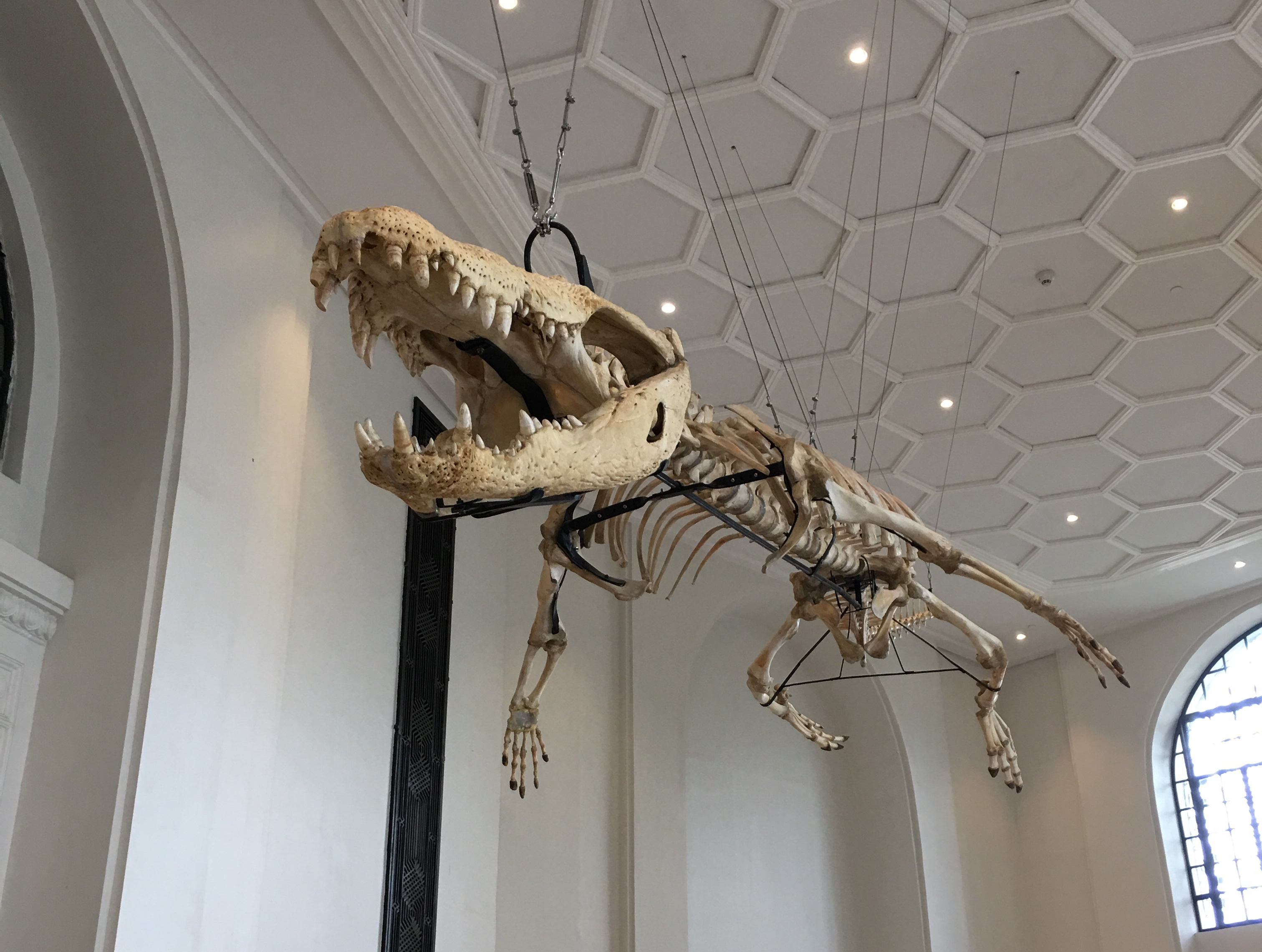
Preserved skeleton of Lolong at Philippine National Museum

In 2017, Lolong's stuffed remains were transported to the National Museum of Natural History in Manila, where it has been on display since its opening in 2018.
