= Richmond Near London =

Painting by Jean-Baptiste-Camille Corot

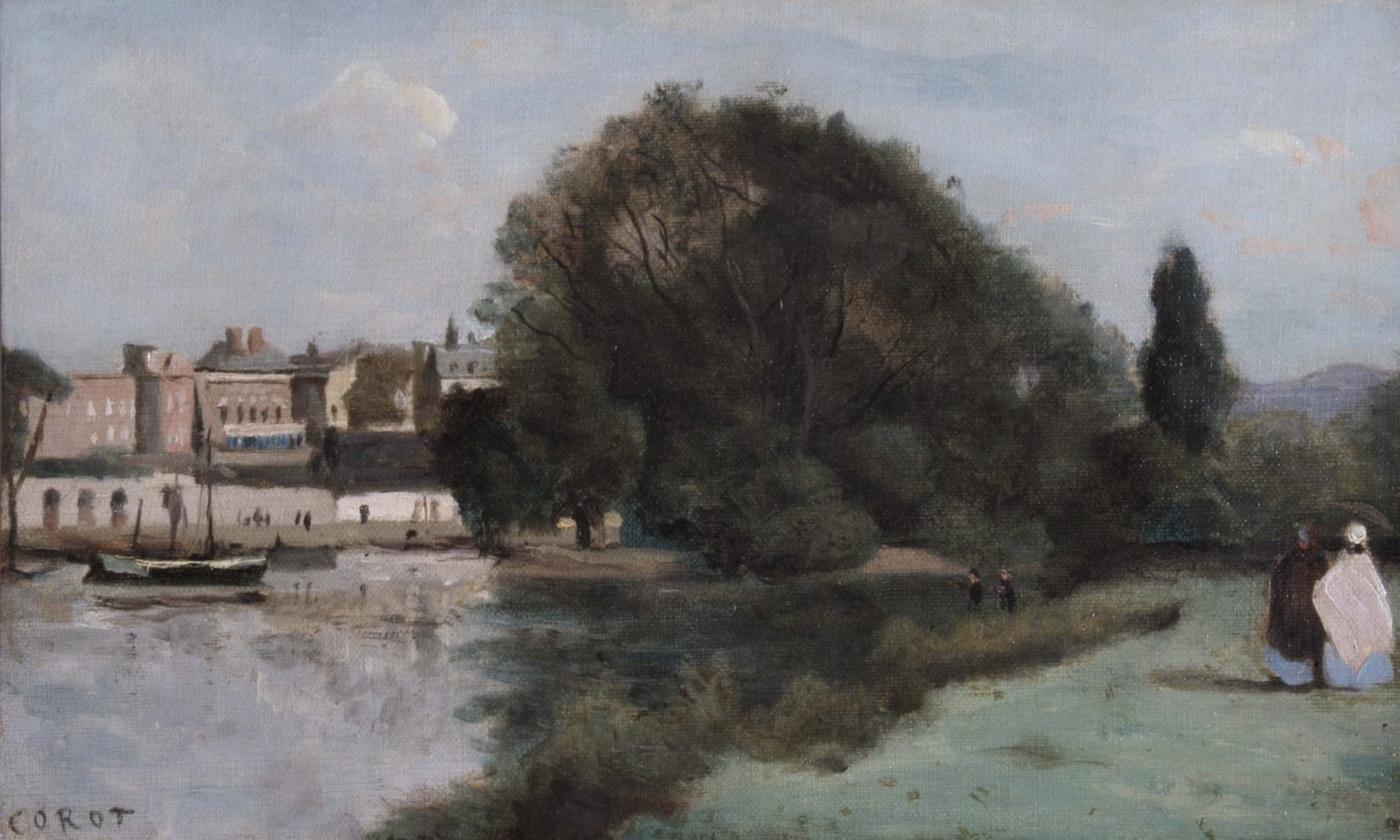
- Artist: Jean-Baptiste-Camille Corot
- Year: 1862
- Type: Oil on canvas, Landscape painting
- Dimensions: 20.5 cm × 34 cm (8.1 in × 13 in)
- Location: Orleans House; Twickenham

Richmond Near London (French: Richmond pres Londres) is an 1862 landscape painting by the French artist Jean-Baptiste-Camille Corot. While now part of Greater London, Richmond was then a town on the outskirts of the city. It depicts a view looking across the River Thames from what was then the Middlesex bank towards Richmond on the Surrey side. Produced from close to Richmond Bridge, it depicts the historic Hotham House.

Corot made his only visit to England in 1862 to visit the International Exhibition held in South Kensington. Today the painting is in the collection of the Orleans House Gallery in Twickenham, which acquired it in 1990.

== Bibliography ==
- De Novellis, Mark. Highlights of the Richmond Borough Art Collection. Orleans House Gallery, 2002.
- Moreau-Nélaton, Etienne. . Histoire de Corot et de ses oeuvres. H. Floury, 1905
