= CarsGuide =

Australian online marketplace and content platform

- Industry: Automotive; E-commerce; Media
- Founded: November 2011
- Headquarters: Sydney
- Key people: Tommy Logtenberg (CEO)
- Owner: Market Herald
- Number of employees: 69
- Website: Official website

CarsGuide is an online marketplace and content platform based in Sydney, Australia. The company specializes in automotive sales and purchases, as well as car news, advice and reviews.

The company was founded in 2011 by News Corp Australia. In 2016 it merged with the Australian branch of Cox Automotive. In May 2020, eBay Classifieds group acquired Cox Media, the subsidiary of Cox Enterprises that runs CarsGuide.

== History ==
In November 2011, News Corp Australia and a network of Australian automotive groups set out to build a destination for Australians to buy and sell cars. This gave launch to CarsGuide in late 2011.

Following a rebrand in late 2014, led by MediaCom, BWM and Interbrand, the company launched a new strategy which included a location-based search and free listings for private sellers.

In 2016, News Corp Australia sold its 55% share in the company, and the company signed a merger agreement with Dealer Solutions, Manheim and Sell My Car to form Cox Automotive Australia, a branch of the Atlanta-based company of the same name, which was completed in late 2016.

In November 2017, the company launched an in-house content agency, Joyride, led by Jamie Clift, formerly of Droga5 and Saatchi & Saatchi.

In February 2018 CEO Lauren Williams leave the company. The vacant position was filled in October by Shaun Cornelius, previously of Deloitte and eBay.

In August 2022, The Market Herald acquired Gumtree.com.au, CarsGuide and Autotrader.com.

== CarsGuide Car of the Year ==
CarsGuide also presents its annual CarsGuide Car of the Year awards, which are judged on value, safety, practicality, and driving dynamics.
