= Gumtree =

Website

- Gumtree's logo as of 2016
- Website type: Classifieds, e-commerce site
- Owners: o3 Industries and Novum Capital
- Website: www.gumtree.com
- Registration: Mandatory
- Launched: March 2000; 26 years ago

Gumtree.com, also known as Gumtree, is a British-based online classified advertisement and community website based at Hotham House, in Richmond, London. Classified ads are either free or paid for depending on the product category and the geographical market. As of November 2010, it was the UK's largest website for local community classifieds and was one of the top 30 websites in the UK, receiving 14.8 million monthly unique visitors according to a traffic audit in 2010.

== History ==
Logo used from 2006 to 2015

Gumtree was founded in March 2000 by Michael Pennington and Simon Crookall as a local London classified ads and community site, designed to connect Australians, New Zealanders and South Africans who were either planning to move, or had just arrived in the city, and needed help getting started with accommodation, employment and meeting new people. The company started in the corner of a small office they sub let from a travel company in Waterloo. The term 'gum tree', the local Australian phrase for eucalyptus trees in general, was chosen as a word that linked the three communities (even though the gum trees found in South Africa are introduced species, whereas gum trees occur natively in Australia and New Zealand). The founders also felt it reflected the roots and branches of a real community.

In May 2005, Gumtree was acquired by eBay's classifieds group for an undisclosed sum; however, eBay disclosed that it paid a collective $81.6 million for three classified sites: Gumtree, LoQUo and opusforum (with Gumtree being the largest). At the time of the acquisition, Gumtree was available in multiple cities in United Kingdom, Poland, France, Canada, Australia (Gumtree Australia), Ireland, New Zealand, South Africa and Hong Kong.

On 7 January 2016, Gumtree's re-branding, including updated logo was published on their website and respective apps.

In July 2020 eBay sold Gumtree UK to Adevinta ASA in a deal worth over $9 billion.

On 1 December 2021 Adevinta ASA announced that it had completed the sale of Gumtree UK and Motors.co.uk to a consortium consisting of O3 Industries (“O3”), a New York-based family investment fund, and Novum Capital, a private equity firm based out of Frankfurt.

In March 2022 the Polish version, Gumtree.pl stopped accepting new listings and announced on its site that it will cease its operations in Poland on 7 April of the same year.

In July 2022 Impresa Capital acquired Gumtree South Africa for an undisclosed sum.

In August 2022, The Market Herald acquired Gumtree Australia and its ownership of Carsguide Autotrader Media Solutions from Adevinta ASA, for a sum of A$86.7million (US$60 million).

Gumtree UK, Gumtree Australia and Gumtree South Africa are now independent companies.

=== Market expansion ===
Expansion beyond the UK include:

- September 2004: Gumtree launched a site in Warsaw, Poland.
- May 2005: Gumtree launched a site in Berlin, Germany.
- June 2005: Gumtree expanded into Italy, with sites in Rome and Milan, increasing its coverage across 31 cities.
- August 2007: Gumtree expanded to the United States, targeting expat communities in New York, Boston and Chicago. Services targeted the two million British, Australian and Polish expatriates in the country.

== Features ==
While the largest category of advertisements on Gumtree is "goods for sale," the site is also home to around 200,000 motors listings across the UK at any one time.

Gumtree has an extensive social media presence on Facebook and Twitter. Gumtree uses social media to communicate news and information about the brand as well as launch competitions and promotions.

Although predominantly a free listings website, Gumtree provides users with paid promotional options for increased advert visibility, such as going to the top of the listings.

In more recent years, Gumtree has extended its service to business customers. The site began selling classified advertising packages to companies looking to post multiple job vacancies and properties.

In 2013, Gumtree extended bulk classifieds listings accounts to car dealers. In 2010, Gumtree launched its Gumtree Media website to publicize its services to potential business clients. The site showcases paid classified listings options as well as display advertising on the Gumtree site.

In 2018, Gumtree introduced a ratings system, for buyers and sellers, and also launched a Keep Gumtree Real campaign "which aims to improve the user experience by encouraging trust and responsibility".

== In popular culture ==
In June 2013 an advert was posted on Gumtree offering a rent-free accommodation to a lodger who would be prepared to dress and act like a walrus. The advert was shared around various sites such as BuzzFeed and Mashable and caught the eye of Hollywood director Kevin Smith, who used the ad as his inspiration for his 2014 film, Tusk, a story of an evil scientist who plans to permanently sew a human into a walrus suit.

== In crime ==
The convicted British online sex offender Matthew Falder approached most of his victims via Gumtree.

Animal rapist and sadist Adam Britton was arrested after video footage of him sexually abusing, torturing and killing dogs was discovered. He had searched for dogs on the website Gumtree Australia, claiming to rehome them, and telling their former owners that they were thriving in his care, when in fact he had already sexually abused and killed them. He is known to have sexually abused 42 dogs, of which 39 were tortured in brutal ways and died.
