= Hotham House =

- eBay UK
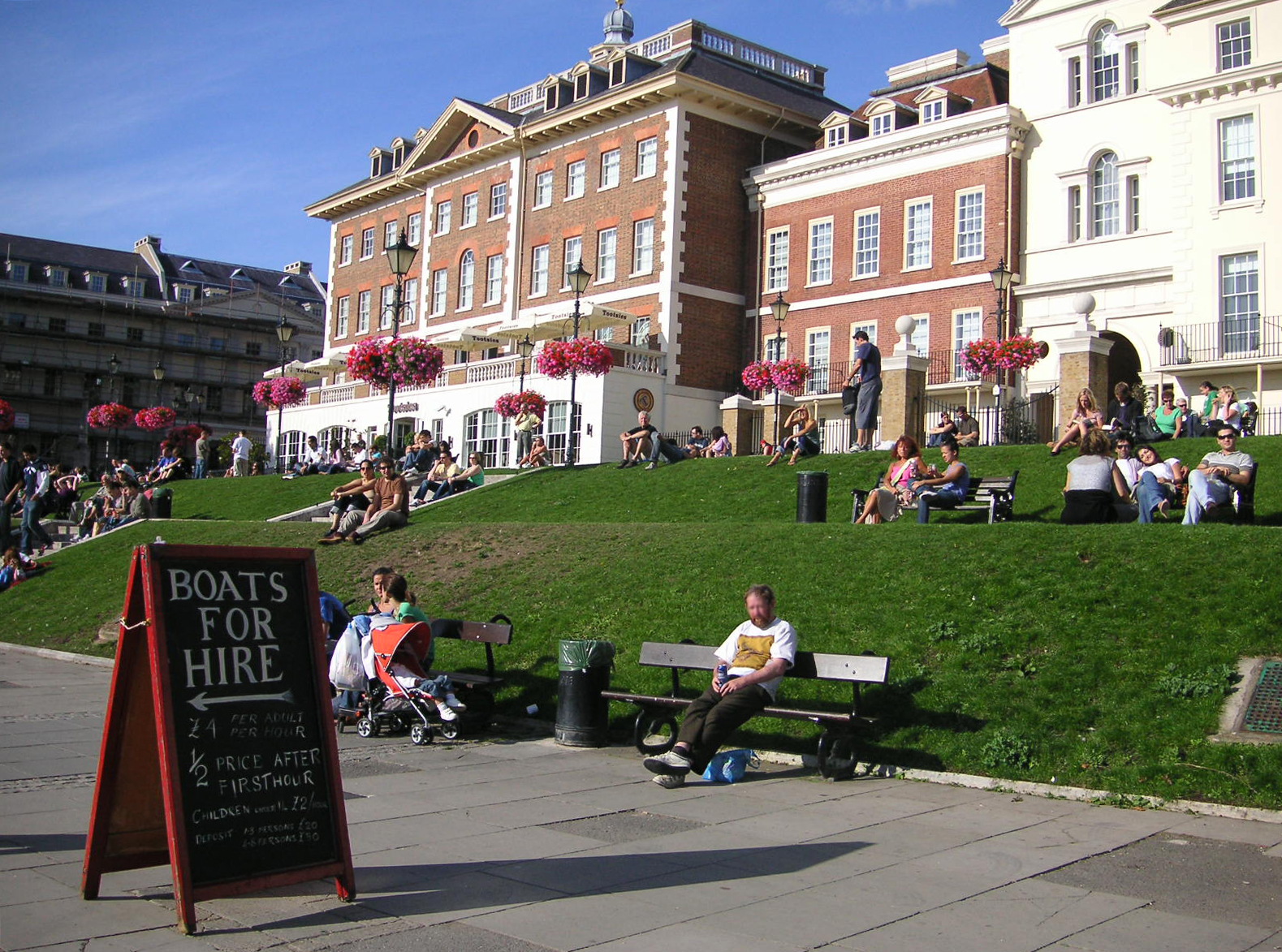

- Location within Greater London

General information
- Type: Company headquarters
- Architectural style: New Classical architecture
- Location: 1 Heron Square, TW9 1EJ
- Coordinates: 51.45855°N 0.30637°W
- Elevation: 10 m (33 ft)
- Current tenants: eBay UK, Gumtree, Shutl, StubHub
- Construction started: 1984
- Completed: 1988
- Inaugurated: 28 October 1988
- Renovation cost: £20m

Design and construction
- Architect: Quinlan Terry

Hotham House is a commercial building in Richmond, in the London Borough of Richmond upon Thames, and the UK headquarters of eBay and Gumtree. It is situated on the eastern side of the River Thames, east of Corporation Island, at the junction of the A305 and A307.

== History ==
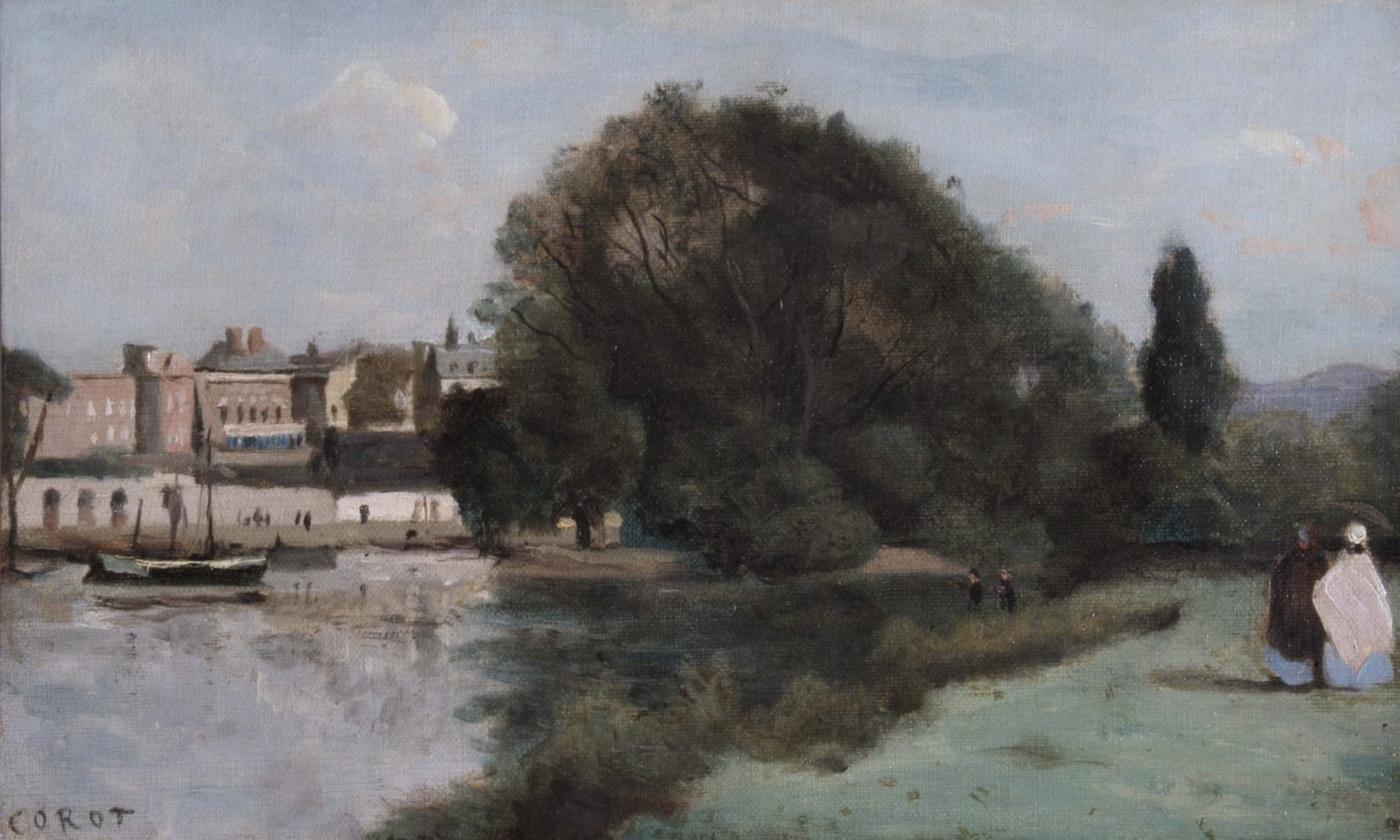
Richmond Near London by Jean-Baptiste-Camille Corot, 1862. It features a view of the historic Hotham House from across the Thames>

The original Hotham House, built in 1720, fell into disrepair and collapsed in 1960, and was demolished. The name of the building came from Admiral Sir William Hotham, who lived there in 1810.

The name was resurrected in the 1980s as part of the new Richmond Riverside development.

=== Construction ===
Construction of the redeveloped series of buildings began in 1984 and finished in 1987 in a £20m renovation funded by the Pension Fund Property Unit Trust. The buildings, designed by Quinlan Terry in a New Classical style, were opened by Queen Elizabeth II on 28 October 1988.

eBay opened their London office there in 2003.

== See also ==
- One Rathbone Square, headquarters of Facebook UK
