= Agusan del Sur State University =

Public university in Agusan del Sur, Philippines

- Former names: Agusan del Sur State College of Agriculture and Technology
- Type: State University
- Established: 1908
- Affiliations: PASUC
- President: Dr. Joy C. Capistrano
- Vice-president: Dr. Carmelo S. Llanto (VP for Academic Affairs); Dr. Fernando L. Marzo, Jr. (VP for Research, Development & Extension Affairs); Ruth S. Desamparo (VP for Administration, Finance & Planning); Janice S. Dini-ay (VP for Student Affairs and Services)
- Location: Bunawan, Agusan del Sur, Philippines; 8°10′09″N 126°00′16″E
- Website: asscat.edu.ph
- Location in Mindanao Location in the Philippines

Agusan del Sur State University, formerly known as the Agusan del Sur State College of Agriculture and Technology (ASSCAT), is a chartered state university in Bunawan, Agusan del Sur, Philippines, through Republic Act No. 7932 approved on March 1, 1995, and RA No. 11586.

== History ==
=== 1906 to 1926 ===
In June 1908, Americans established the Manobo Industrial School (MIS) to educate the people of Agusan province to a better way of life after a group of them led by Dean C. Worcester visited Agusan province in 1906 and determined the needs of the people. The students of MIS were sons of Manobo "datus" from the regions of Simulao, Adgawan, Umayam, Gibung, and Wawa-Ojot while the principal was Carlson Berger with Mr. and Mrs. Joseph Kempt, Liberato Fortun, and Ciriaco Viajar as members of the faculty. The school was situated opposite the poblacion of Bunawan along the bank of the Simulao River. Executive Order No. 52 issued by Governor-General William Cameron Forbes on June 24, 1908, granted the school site a reserved area of 41.9089 hectares (Parcel 1) and 0.1764 hectares (Parcel 2).

To improve the farming practices of the people, MIS was later on converted into Manobo Farm School (MFS). During school year 1915–1916, a Grade V class was opened with Ellsworth Maxwell as principal and George L. Broxholm, Cornelio del Rosario, and Dedicación del Rosario as teachers. Pupils lived in Bunawan with their parents or relatives otherwise pupils coming from the municipalities of Cuevas, Trento, Libertad, Veruela, La Paz, Loreto, Prosperidad, Talacogon, San Luis, Esperanza and Lianga, Surigao were accommodated in the dormitory with free clothing, bedding, and subsistence.

=== 1927 to World War II ===
Through Education Act of 1927, MFS became Bunawan Agricultural High School in 1927. Under Proclamation No. 677 issued by Governor-General Frank Murphy on April 2, 1934, additional site of 280.8131 hectares was reserved for the school. The first year high school was in school year 1927–1928 and was extended to fourth year during school year 1930–1931. It was temporarily closed during World War II.

The school has the following Filipino principals before the outbreak of World War II:

| Name | School Year |
|---|---|
| Francisco Fernan | 1923–1926 |
| Manuel Flojo | 1926-1929 |
| Mr Acuña | 1929–1933 |
| Anastacio Limbo | 1933–1938 |
| Mr. Obias | 1938-1941 |

=== After World War II to 1958 ===
After World War II, the school was reopened and renamed Bunawan National Agricultural Junior High School by virtue of Republic Act No. 301 which was approved on June 17, 1948.

With the re-establishment of the high school in Bunawan, parents began to enroll their children at the Bunawan Junior Agricultural High School (BJAHS) instead of in Mampising, Davao or in Ampayon, Butuan City. Raymundo Curato, the principal of Bunawan District, was designated to open the school as Farm Manager by Mariano Manaligod, Division Superintendent of Schools for Agusan; Enrique Paller, the Farm Manager of the School in Ampayon acted as officer-in-charge (OIC) of BJAHS until Jose F. Luna came as principal.

Luna arrived in September 1948 and immediately moved to provide facilities, books, equipment, working animals, food and other needs until his replacement by Domingo C. Gabertan on August 4, 1949.

Gabertan decided to relocate the school campus on higher ground due to the yearly flooding on the old site. The present site now along the Agusan-Davao National Highway (Daang Maharlika). RA.#948 was approved on June 20, 1953, converting the school into Bunawan National Agricultural School (BUNAS). Five ICA-NEC (FOA-Philcusa) buildings were constructed: Vocational Agricultural Buildings, Homemaking Building, Farm Shop, Farm machineries, Granary and the concrete water tower. Gabertan, however, was transferred to Negros Occidental National Agricultural School in Kabankalan on August 16, 1956, after he was sent to the United States for one year advanced studies. The faculty and students held their classes in the new site but they continue to stay at the old site which was about 2 km until the old girls' dormitory was finished in 1958.

=== 1958 to 1987 ===
Felipe C. Galeon succeeded Gabertan as principal. During his time additional buildings were constructed like the girls' dormitory, social hall, and practice house, until his promotion to the General Office, Manila in the later part of 1960. Following Galeon as principal was Perfecto C. Boncato, who was transferred from Bilar Rural High School, Bilar, Bohol.

Boncato was able to construct the Related Subjects and Home Management buildings, and laid out the school playground. When Boncato left in 1966, Arturo Cubangbang, Santiago T. Medrano, and Federico S. Zamora were temporarily designated as officers-in-charge until the transfer of Gregorio C. Alava, principal of Davao National Regional Agricultural School to BUNAS in school year 1966–1967. Alava was later replaced by Felipe C. Badua who was promoted as principal effective on June 23, 1967, and as vocational school administrator I on July 1, 1974, until his retirement on May 27, 1985.

On June 21, 1969, the Bunawan National Agricultural School (BUNAS) was converted into Southern Agusan National Agricultural College (SANAC) through Republic Act No. 5917 which was sponsored by then Congressman Jose C. Aquino of Agusan. Congressman Democrito Plaza during SY 1969-70 included in the General Appropriations Act for the operation of SANAC.

Circular No. 8 issued by the defunct Bureau of Vocational Education (BVE) on October 4, 1974, authorized the school to offer the Revised Two-year Post-Secondary Agricultural Technician curriculum starting the second semester, school year 1974–1975. This was the result of the effort made by Gov. Valentina G. Plaza in inviting a team from BVE. One hundred thirty three students graduated from this course in five batches until it was phased out in school year 1986–1987.

The CMU (Central Mindanao University) Off-Campus Institute at SANAC started offering the first year of the four-year general collegiate academic course during the first semester of SY 1979–80 with members of the faculty who were trained at CMU, Musuan, Bukidnon, for two summers, acting as affiliate instructors. The following year, second-year subjects were offered. After the second, the CMU Off-Campus students were supposed to proceed o the CMU Main Campus for their third and fourth years, or to other colleges\universities of their choice. This program was in operation in SANAC for four years until it was suspended at the beginning of SY 1983-1984 because the number of students who wanted to enroll did not reach the desired number as required by university authorities.

=== 1987 to 1996 ===
On June 23, 1987, DECS Order No. 66, series of 1987 was issued granting authority to the school to operate the ladder-type Bachelor of Agricultural Technology (B.A.T.) course. The first two years of this course admitted NCEE and non-NCEE qualifiers, leading to the Diploma in Agricultural Technology (D.A.T.), but only NCEE qualifiers can proceed to the third and fourth years leading to the Bachelor of Agricultural Technology degree.

Nicasio T. Domingo Jr., who replaced Badua as vocational school administrator, exerted efforts to increase students achievement by upgrading the quality of instruction; curriculum improvements; faculty and staff development; and acquisition of needed field, laboratory, and library facilities. In school year 1989-1990 there was a 100% qualification in the NCEE among the fourth-year students who took the examination; the school produced its first batch of B.A.T. graduates, a significant milestone.

Nicasio T. Domingo was transferred to the DECS Regional Office, Region X, Cagayan de Oro City effective September 17, 1990, and Ramona S. Nono, Administrative Officer II, was designated officer-in-charge from September 1990 to February 5, 1991. Cristeto Ra. Abrea, vocational school principal I of Kinoguitan National Agricultural School (KNAS), Misamis Oriental, was designated officer-in-charge of SANAC effective February 6, 1991.

Starting the academic year 1992–93, through DECS Order No. 88 s. 1992, two academic programs were added: Bachelor of Secondary Education (BSEd) major in Technology and Home Economics, and the Bachelor of Elementary Education (BEEd) with concentration in Work Education and with the initial offering of Laboratory Grade School.

In the same year, Congressman Ceferino S. Paredes Jr. sponsored Batas Pambansa House Bill No. 1432 and supported by the Senate Bill No. 1690 of Senator Edgardo J. Angara, for the conversion of SANAC into a state college. On March 1, 1995, President Fidel V. Ramos signed RA No 7932 transforming SANAC into Agusan del Sur State College of Agriculture and Technology (ASSCAT). More degree programs were offered: Diploma in Inland Fishery Technology (DIFT) leading to Bachelor in Inland Fishery Technology (BIFT), Bachelor of Science in Agro-Forestry (BSAF), and Bachelor of Science in Agribusiness and Information Technology (BSAIT).

The DAT-BAT program was strengthened when ASSCAT was one of the four identified institutions in Mindanao which availed the support and assistance from the Australian Agency for International Development (AusAID) and Education Development Projects Implementing Task Force (EDPITAF). The project gained bilateral funding from the Philippine-Australian Agricultural Technology Education Project (PA-AGRITECH) from 1996 to 2000. The 60 million pesos grant-in-aid for ASSCAT was in the form of refurbished theory room, library, farm mechanics shop, laboratories for science, crop and food processing, nursery, and Community Outreach Center (COC). Computers, typewriters, overhead-projector, photocopier, recent editions of library books, course materials and other references were provided.

=== 1996 to present ===
Cristeto Ra. Abrea served as OIC college president from 1995 to 1997 and became the first installed ASSCAT president in January 1997. Upon his retirement in January 2001, Dr. Roberto N. Padua, CHED Commissioner assumed as Chair of the Management Committee on January 13, 2001, to August 22, 2001, while Bernardino Z. Ente Jr. M.P.A. served as ASSCAT OIC president from August 22, 2001, to February 13, 2002. During the academic year 2001–2002, three curricular programs were added: Bachelor of Science in Agricultural Engineering (BSAE), Bachelor of Science in Electronics and Communications Engineering (BSECE) and Bachelor of Science in Information Technology (BSIT).

=== Conversion to State University ===
The Philippine House of Representatives received on September 19, 2018, House Bill Numbered 8263 introduced by Representative Evelyn P. Mellana converting the Agusan del Sur State College of Agriculture and Technology into a state university to be known as Agusan del Sur State University.

In the current 18th Congress Representative Eddiebong Plaza refiled the bill as HB 3184 and was transmitted to the Senate as HB 7019. Senator Marcos filed SBN 1689 as counterpart bill in the Upper House. The bill was taken up recently by the Committee on Higher and Technical Education. A thorough evaluation of ASSCAT was scheduled prior to Committee approval.

On January 30, 2019, the Philippine House of Representatives received a report from the House Committee on Higher and Technical Education, Appropriations, and Ways and Means recommending the approval of House Bill No. 8916 in substitution of House Bill No. 8263 converting the Agusan del Sur State College of Agriculture and Technology into a state university to be known as the Agusan del Sur State University.

On August 4, 2021, President Rodrigo Duterte signed R.A 11586 which converts the state college into a university with its new name, Agusan del Sur State University.

== Instruction ==
The college continues to tune its baccalaureate programs to the country's development needs. ASSCAT's agricultural programs support the provincial and regional thrusts as spelled out in the Caraga Medium Term Development Plan.

Home and Food Technology and other allied courses are offered. There is a two-year diploma in Inland Fishery Technology. Short-term computer courses are available.

The college pursues AACCUP accreditation on all degree programs. On October 25, 2011, Juarlito V. Garcines was appointed college president at CHED Central Office. As of 2014 nine degree programs were offered:

- Bachelor of Agricultural Technology (BAT)
- BS Agriculture major in Horticulture, Animal Science
- BS Agribusiness
- BSE major in Biology, Mathematics and Technology and Livelihood Education
- Bachelor of Elementary Education
- BS Agricultural Engineering
- BS Electronics and Communication Engineering
- BS Information Technology

The library was a donation from the Bunawan LGU through the effort of Mayor Gilbert G. Elorde. Books and electronic resources such as VHS, CDs and transparencies worth about 4.5 million were donated by Congressman Rodolfo G. Plaza, who also assisted with the installation of the College Speech Laboratory.

== Production ==
The proceeds from Income Generating Projects (IGP) have augmented the services and facilities needed by the students and faculty. In particular, the amount repair of the building which is the Accreditation Center serving the three institutes came from the IGP. The oil palm, coffee and rubber plantation projects income helped for the repair and renovation of the ceilings of some old and dilapidated buildings. IGP proceeds were used for the concrete pavement on the school premises.

The amount used for the construction of the College Cafeteria was taken from IGP proceeds. The college cafeteria functions as an IGP, but it has very limited income because nutritious foods were served at minimal costs.

Organic rice farming and corn seed production are in the experimental stage. Vegetable growing is gaining popularity and prominence because of the use of organic fertilizer. Animal projects are on the break-even phase but being maintained as Students Instructional Units (SIUs) necessary for the agricultural programs.

== Degree programs ==
The following courses are offered at Agusan del Sur State University.

=== Graduate programs ===
- Masters of Science in Agronomy Minor in Animal Science
- Masters of Science in Agronomy Minor in Horticulture
- Masters of Science in Animal Science Minor in Agronomy
- Masters of Science in Animal Science Minor in Horticulture
- Masters of Science in Horticulture Minor in Agronomy
- Masters of Science in Horticulture Minor in Animal Science
- Masters of Science in Agronomy Minor in Animal Science
- Masters of Science in Agronomy Minor in Horticulture
- Masters of Science in Animal Science Minor in Agronomy
- Masters of Science in Animal Science Minor in Horticulture
- Masters of Science in Horticulture Minor in Agronomy
- Masters of Science in Horticulture Minor in Animal Science

=== Undergraduate programs ===
- Bachelor of Agricultural Technology
- Bachelor of Science in Agribusiness
- Bachelor of Science in Agroforestry
- Bachelor of Science in Agriculture Major in Agronomy
- Bachelor of Science in Agriculture Major in Animal Science
- Bachelor of Science in Agriculture Major in Horticulture
- Bachelor of Science in Entrepreneurship
- Diploma in Inland Fisheries
- One Year Oil Palm Technology
- Bachelor of Arts in English Language
- Bachelor of Science in Applied Mathematics
- Bachelor of Science in Biology
- Bachelor of Science in Environmental Science
- Bachelor of Science in Agricultural and Biosystems Engineering
- Bachelor of Science in Civil Engineering
- Bachelor of Science in Electronics Engineering
- Bachelor of Science in Information System
- Bachelor of Science in Information Technology
- Bachelor of Industrial Technology Major in Civil Technology
- Bachelor of Industrial Technology Major in Electronics Technology
- Bachelor of Industrial Technology Major in Heating, Ventilating and Air-Conditioning
- Bachelor of Industrial Technology Major in Welding and Fabrication Technology
- Bachelor of Elementary Education
- Bachelor of Secondary Education Major in Biology/Science
- Bachelor of Secondary Education Major in English
- Bachelor of Secondary Education Major in Mathematics
- Bachelor of Secondary Education Major in Technology and Livelihood Education
- Bachelor of Technology and Livelihood Education Major in Agri-Fishery Arts
- Technology and Livelihood Education Major in Home Economics
- Technology and Livelihood Education Major in Industrial Arts
