= GumTree =

Open-source software suite for scientific experiments

- Developer: ANSTO
- Stable release: 1.6.3 / August 26, 2011
- Operating system: Cross-platform
- Type: Scientific Workbench
- License: Eclipse Public License
- Website: at sourceforge.net

GumTree is an open-source scientific workbench for performing scientific experiments under a distributed network environment. It provides a multi-platform graphical user interface for instrument data acquisition, online or offline data visualisation and analysis. GumTree is designed to provide a highly Integrated Scientific Experiment Environment (ISEE), allowing interaction between different components within the workbench. Several instrument control server systems including TANGO, EPICS and SICS have been adapted to GumTree. Current developments include acquisition, control and analysis on neutron and synchrotron beamlines. In the future it will be extended telescope control and other scientific instruments with distributed hardware.

== History ==
GumTree was first started as a small graphical user interface project to fulfill the IT requirement for the Neutron Beam Instrument Project (NBIP) at ANSTO. Later in the year, the GumTree project has been approved to go open source for international collaboration.

- 02/2004 GumTree project started
- 08/2004 GumTree was approved to go open source
- 09/2005 GumTree 1.0 milestone 7 released
- 03/2006 GumTree has received the Best Open Source RCP Application from the Eclipse Foundation
- 01/2007 Codehaus has accepted to host the GumTree Project on their website
- 09/2008 GumTree 1.0 released

== Architecture ==
GumTree is based on the Eclipse Rich Client Platform (RCP). In order to support scientific operations, GumTree extends RCP with data handling framework and visualisation toolkit as part of the GumTree platform API.

== GumTree Extension ==
Adapting GumTree on a particular instrument requires special customisation to fit the scientific workbench to its instrument ecosystem. Customisation of GumTree can be achieved by adding new plug-ins to the existing GumTree application. In a broader sense, the common base of GumTree is a generic platform which provides all the necessary infrastructure to realise the ISEE concept for the scientific instrument. This platform, known as the GumTree Platform, is built and modelled upon an award-winning Java based universal platform called Eclipse. The GumTree Platform consists of an Eclipse Rich Client Platform (RCP) application, and an application framework for handling data exchange, experiment life cycle, device control (via distributed control system e.g. TANGO), application accessibility, data visualisation, and data analysis. All services from the platform can be extended and modified to suit any particular scientific instrument. A developer adds a GumTree workbench (or RCP based GumTree application) which integrates all services provided by the GumTree Platform. The GumTree Platform encourages developers to encapsulate the knowledge of an experiment method or procedure in the workbench.
