= Bunawan =

Municipality in Agusan del Sur, Philippines

- Municipality
- Municipality of Bunawan
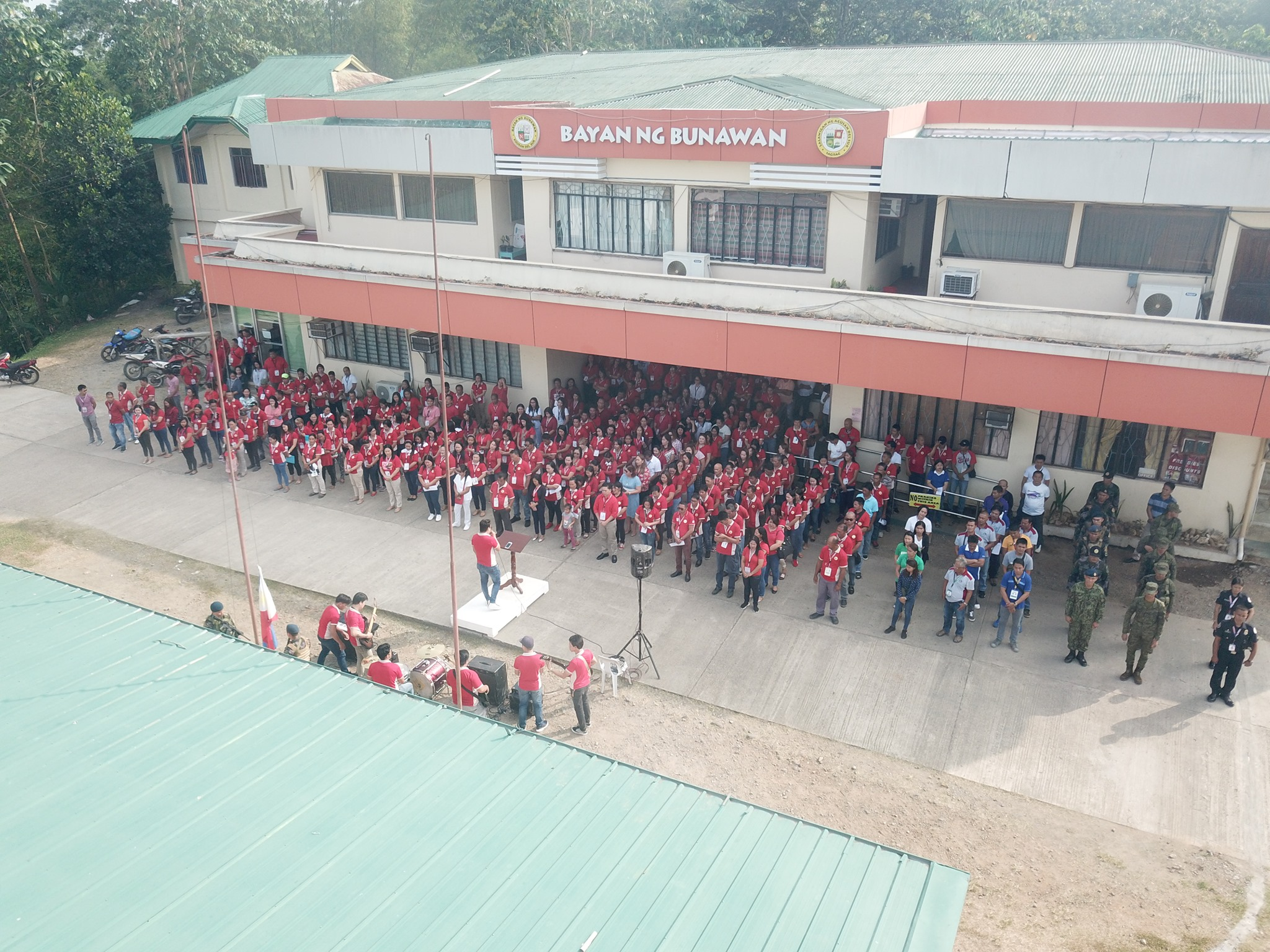
- Municipal hall

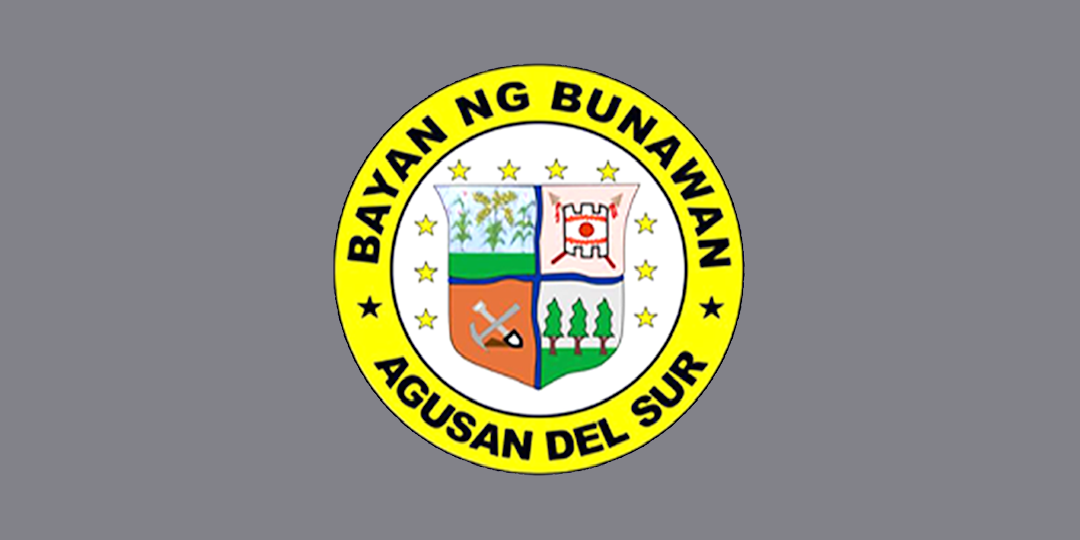
- Flag Seal

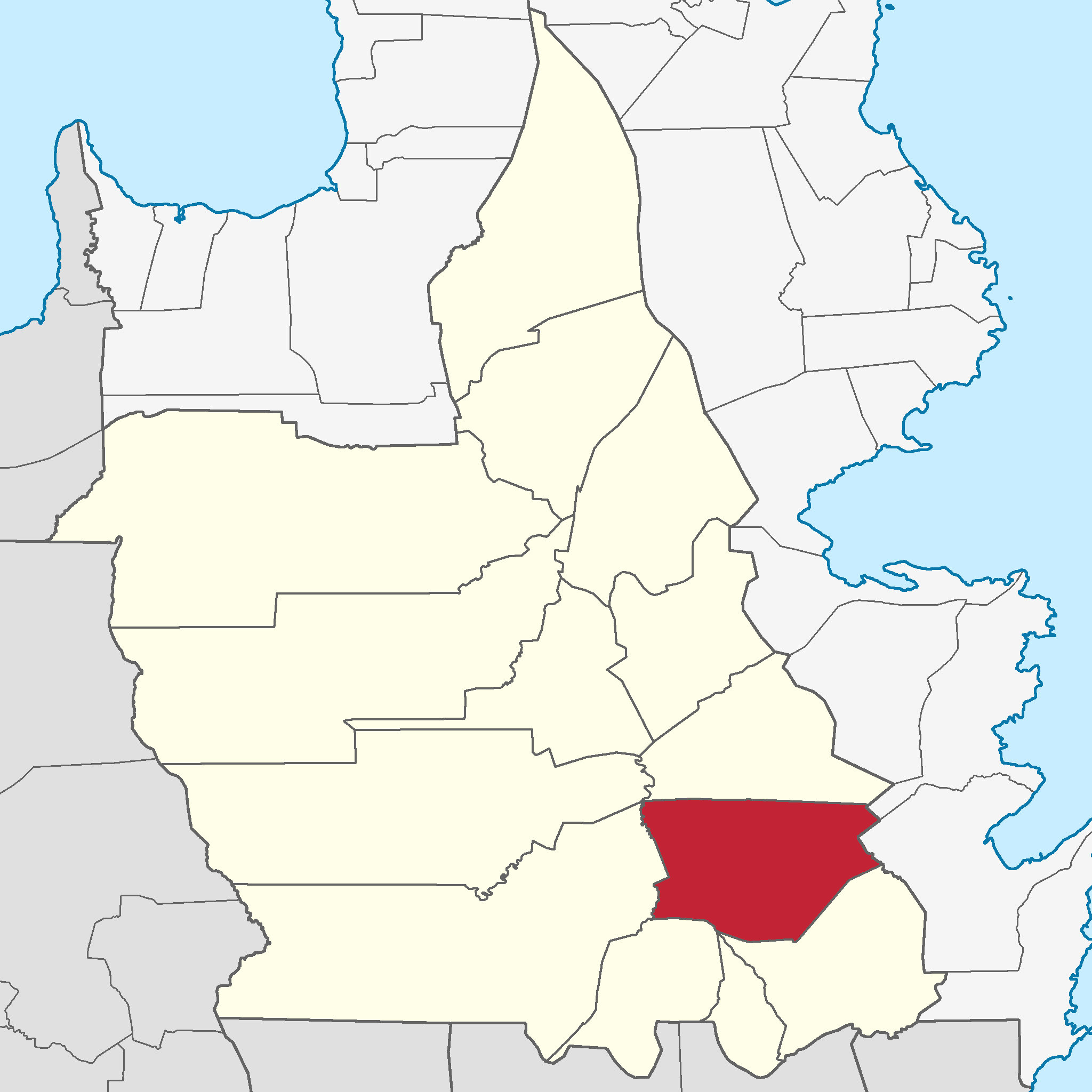
- Map of Agusan del Sur with Bunawan highlighted
- Interactive map of Bunawan
- Location within the Philippines
- Coordinates: 8°11′N 125°59′E
- Country: Philippines
- Region: Caraga
- Province: Agusan del Sur
- District: 2nd district
- Founded: January 26, 1959
- Barangays: 10 (see Barangays)

Government
  - Type: Sangguniang Bayan
  - Mayor: Sylvia B. Elorde
  - Vice Mayor: Gilbert G. Elorde
  - Representative: Adolph Edward G. Plaza
  - Electorate: 23,003 voters (2025)

Area
  - Total: 512.16 km^{2} (197.75 sq mi)
- Elevation: 97 m (318 ft)
- Highest elevation: 805 m (2,641 ft)
- Lowest elevation: 17 m (56 ft)

Population (2024 census)
  - Total: 50,999
  - Density: 99.576/km^{2} (257.90/sq mi)
  - Households: 11,924

Economy
  - Income class: 1st municipal income class
  - Poverty incidence: 23.08% (2023)
  - Revenue: ₱ 474.8 million (2024)
  - Assets: ₱ 1,628 million (2024)
  - Expenditure: ₱ 38.98 million (2024)
  - Liabilities: ₱ 120.1 million (2024)

Service provider
  - Electricity: Agusan del Sur Electric Cooperative (ASELCO)
- Time zone: UTC+8 (PST)
- ZIP code: 8506
- PSGC: 1600302000
- IDD : area code: +63 (0)85
- Native languages: Agusan; Butuanon; Higaonon; Tagalog
- Website: www.bunawan.gov.ph

Bunawan, officially the Municipality of Bunawan (Cebuano: Lungsod sa Bunawan; Tagalog: Bayan ng Bunawan), is a municipality in the province of Agusan del Sur, Philippines. According to the 2024 census, it has a population of 50,999 people.

Bunawan was created on June 21, 1959, through Republic Act No. 2517. The world's largest crocodile, Lolong, was captured in the town in September 2011.

== Geography ==
According to the Philippine Statistics Authority, the municipality has a land area of 512.16 square kilometres (197.75 sq mi) constituting 5.13% of the 9,989.52-square-kilometre- (3,856.98 sq mi) total area of Agusan del Sur.

=== Climate ===
Climate data for Bunawan, Agusan del Sur
Month	Jan	Feb	Mar	Apr	May	Jun	Jul	Aug	Sep	Oct	Nov	Dec	Year
Mean daily maximum °C (°F)	27 (81)	27 (81)	27 (81)	29 (84)	29 (84)	29 (84)	29 (84)	30 (86)	30 (86)	29 (84)	28 (82)	28 (82)	29 (83)
Mean daily minimum °C (°F)	22 (72)	21 (70)	22 (72)	22 (72)	23 (73)	23 (73)	23 (73)	23 (73)	23 (73)	23 (73)	22 (72)	22 (72)	22 (72)
Average precipitation mm (inches)	64 (2.5)	48 (1.9)	40 (1.6)	28 (1.1)	41 (1.6)	48 (1.9)	38 (1.5)	34 (1.3)	33 (1.3)	46 (1.8)	52 (2.0)	53 (2.1)	525 (20.6)
Average rainy days	13.9	12.5	12.2	12.2	16.5	17.6	17.5	17.4	16.6	19.0	16.6	14.6	186.6
Source: Meteoblue

=== Barangays ===
Bunawan is politically subdivided into 10 barangays. Each barangay consists of puroks while some have sitios.

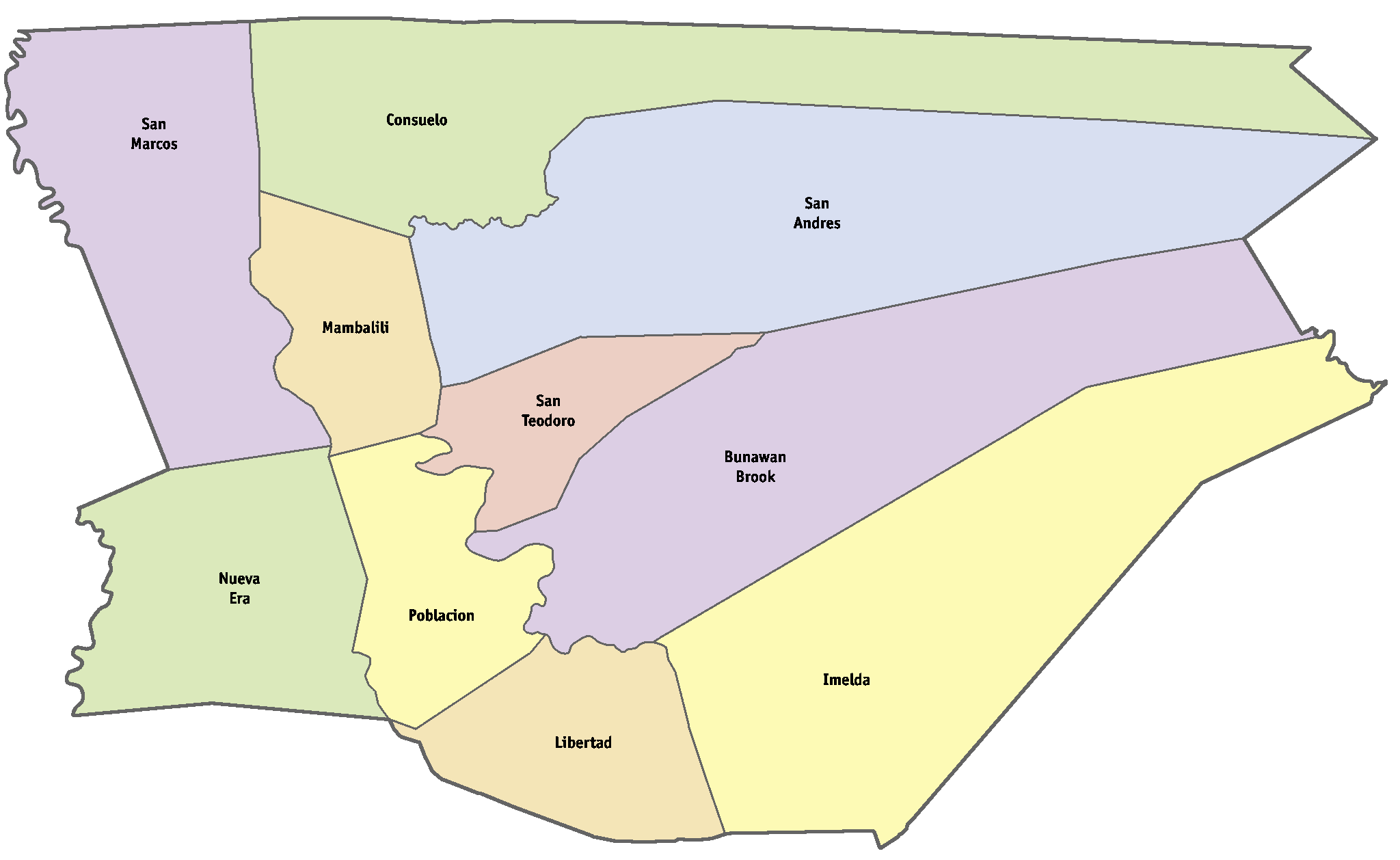
Political map of Bunawan

PSGC	Barangay	Population			±% p.a.	
		2024		2010		
160302001	Bunawan Brook	10.4%	5,283	5,063	▴	0.30%
160302002	Consuelo	18.7%	9,528	5,863	▴	3.43%
160302008	Imelda	3.3%	1,672	1,179	▴	2.46%
160302003	Libertad	12.9%	6,583	6,018	▴	0.63%
160302004	Mambalili	5.9%	3,008	2,355	▴	1.72%
160302009	Nueva Era	2.7%	1,375	1,139	▴	1.32%
160302005	Poblacion	10.5%	5,379	4,683	▴	0.97%
160302006	San Andres	6.5%	3,336	3,043	▴	0.64%
160302007	San Marcos	2.4%	1,212	896	▴	2.12%
160302010	San Teodoro	15.2%	7,775	7,243	▴	0.49%
	Total		50,999	37,482	▴	2.16%

== Demographics ==
Population census of Bunawan
Year	Pop.	±% p.a.
1918	2,648	—
1939	4,743	+2.81%
1948	6,384	+3.36%
1960	11,423	+4.97%
1970	8,646	−2.74%
1975	9,603	+2.13%
1980	12,719	+5.78%
1990	21,105	+5.20%
1995	24,615	+2.92%
2000	26,704	+1.76%
2007	35,757	+4.11%
2010	37,482	+1.73%
2015	45,151	+3.61%
2020	47,512	+1.08%
2024	50,999	+1.71%
Source: Philippine Statistics Authority

In the 2024 census, Bunawan had a population of 50,999. The population density was 100 inhabitants per square kilometre (260/sq mi).

== Economy ==
Poverty incidence of Bunawan (%)

Source: Philippine Statistics Authority

== Education ==
=== Primary and Elementary ===
Central elementary schools
Name	Barangay
East Bunawan Central Elementary School	San Teodoro
West Bunawan Central Elementary School	Poblacion

=== High Schools ===
There are three high schools in the municipality.

School	Barangay
Agusan del Sur State College of Agriculture and Technology	San Teodoro
Bunawan National High School	San Teodoro
Libertad National High School	Libertad

=== University ===
Bunawan has 1 university, the Agusan del Sur State University.

== Crocodile Lolong ==
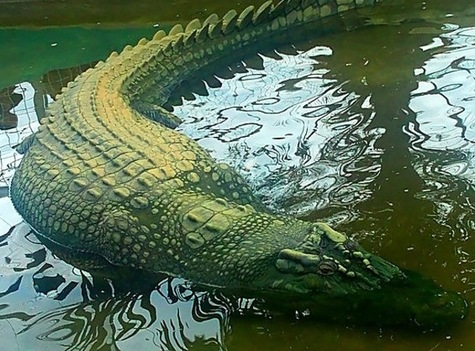
crocodile Lolong

In early September 2011, local residents and veteran crocodile hunters caught a 6.17-metre-long (20.2 ft) saltwater crocodile weighing 1,075 kilograms (2,370 lb) in a local creek. The municipality planned to make the giant beast the centerpiece of an ecotourism park for species found in the marshlands.

On November 9, 2011, the National Geographic Team confirmed that Lolong was the world's biggest crocodile. The crocodile was transferred at the Bunawan Eco-Park and Research Center in Barangay Consuelo.

Villagers had witnessed the crocodile attack and kill a water buffalo, and they suspected it also killed a fisherman who went missing that summer. Experts from an area crocodile farm were called in to capture the wild animal, which destroyed four traps before a stronger one caught it. A hundred villagers were needed to drag the crocodile to a truck before a crane was used to put it in a truck. From there, it was taken to a special cage where it was expected to be held until the ecotourism park was built around it.

The crocodile was declared dead a few hours after flipping over in a pond with a bloated stomach on February 10, 2013. The crocodile, despite being responsible for many deadly attacks, was mourned by residents of the town, as it was the only notable tourist attraction in the area. Its remains are preserved to allow the municipality to keep its fame.

Several other crocodiles roam the marshy areas on the outskirts of town, and villagers have been told to avoid the marshes at night.

== Industry ==
Co-O Gold Mine of Philsaga Mining Corporation is located in Barangay Consuelo.
