= Adam Britton =

British crocodile expert and zoosadist

- Born: Adam Robert Corden Britton; May 16, 1971 (age 55); Wakefield, West Yorkshire, England
- Citizenship: British; Australian
- Education: Queen Elizabeth Grammar School; University of Leeds (BsC); University of Bristol (PhD)
- Occupations: Zoologist, research associate
- Years active: 1996–2022
- Employer: Charles Darwin University
- Known for: Animal abuse
- Motive: Zoosadism and zoophilia
- Convictions: Animal abuse Sexual abuse Zoophilia; Zoosadism; Bestiality; Torture; Possession of child exploitative material

Details
- Victims: 42 (39 killed dogs and 3 sexually abused)
- Span of crimes: 2014–2022
- Country: Australia
- State: Northern Territory
- Target: Dogs being sold on Gumtree Australia
- Date apprehended: September 2022

Adam Robert Corden Britton (born May 16, 1971) is a British-born Australian former zoologist and sex offender who was convicted on multiple criminal offenses including animal abuse, zoophilia, zoosadism, bestiality, and possession of child sexual abuse material. In September 2023, he was charged with 56 counts related to the sexual abuse, torture, and killing of dogs, along with possession of child abuse material. Britton pleaded guilty to all charges in August 2024 and was sentenced to 10 years and 5 months in prison.

The investigation into his crimes also facilitated the prosecution and conviction of other animal sadists within his global network. Through this case, authorities were able to uncover a broader network of individuals involved in similar offenses, leading to further arrests and convictions in other countries.

== Early life and education ==
Britton was born in 1971 in Wakefield, West Yorkshire. He was educated at Queen Elizabeth Grammar School in Wakefield and studied zoology at the University of Leeds where he graduated with a BSc in 1992. He subsequently gained a PhD in zoology from the University of Bristol in 1996.

Court documents state that he had concealed a "sadistic sexual interest" in animals since he was a child and began molesting horses at the age of 13.

== Crocodile expert ==
Britton moved to Australia in 1996, where he met his future wife, who was a wildlife ranger and biologist. They set up a consultancy, dealing with wild crocodiles.

Britton, who was considered a crocodile expert, presented a programme on BBC Television and alongside his wife, he once worked with the biologist David Attenborough.

Britton was also employed as a research associate at Charles Darwin University.

== Criminal history ==
Britton began abusing dogs in 2014 and was arrested in September 2022. There was a suppression order on his name until he pleaded guilty in September 2023.

He had searched for dogs on the website Gumtree Australia, claiming to rehome them, and telling their former owners that they were thriving in his care, when in fact he had already sexually abused, tortured, and killed them. He is known to have sexually abused 42 dogs, 39 of which died.

As of 25 September 2023, Britton faced 60 charges related to using child abuse material and bestiality, to which he pleaded guilty.

Sentencing was scheduled for December 2023 but was postponed several times; he was finally sentenced in Darwin on 8 August 2024 to ten years and five months in prison, backdated to his arrest in April 2022, with a non-parole period of six years. He was also banned for life from purchasing animals and having them on his property. Judge Grant stated that his conduct "… involved a degree of depravity and reprehensibility which falls entirely outside any ordinary human conception and comprehension." Britton stated in a letter written in prison and read by his lawyer that he was "truly sorry" and would seek "long-term care." Judge Grant was not satisfied that Britton showed any true remorse, stating "I also have no doubt that you would have continued with this conduct had you not been arrested by police."

Emma Hurst, of the Animal Justice Party, described the sentence as "pathetically weak" and stated that "When someone tortures, rapes and kills animals in a such a sadistic way, they should be punished accordingly."

In 2022, legislation increasing penalties for animal cruelty was introduced in the Northern Territory; however, Britton's crimes preceded this.

== Personal life ==
Britton had been married to his wife since 1997; she divorced him following his conviction.
