= Gumtree.com.au =

Australian online-classifieds marketplace

- Website type: Classified advertising
- Available in: English
- Area served: Australia
- Owner: The Market Herald
- Parent: Formerly eBay (2005–2021); Adevinta (2021–2022)
- Website: gumtree.com.au
- Commercial: Yes
- Registration: Optional (required for some services)
- Launched: April 2007; 19 years ago
- Current status: Active

Gumtree.com.au is an Australian online-classifieds marketplace that facilitates person-to-person buying, selling and job-seeking across more than 150 product and service categories.

== History ==
The Gumtree brand originated in London in 2000 and was acquired by eBay in May 2005 during the auction company's global push into local classified advertising. Gumtree's Australian version went live two years later, providing a digital-only rival to Fairfax Media’s print-centred Trading Post. Motor-vehicle listings were available from the outset, but Gumtree Cars was spun off as a named sub-brand in 2017.

In 2020, eBay moved to divest its global classifieds businesses. Gumtree Australia was bundled with CarsGuide and Autotrader.com.au (both acquired earlier that year from Cox Automotive) and sold to Adevinta in June 2021. Adevinta soon began off-loading non-core assets and, in August 2022, agreed to sell Gumtree Australia, together with CarsGuide and Autotrader, to The Market Herald, a Perth-listed media company.
