= 2025 Philippine local elections in Caraga =

- May 12, 2025
- Gubernatorial elections
- 5 provincial governors and 1 city mayor
Party	Seats	+/–
Nacionalista	2	0
NUP	2	+1
PDP–Laban	1	−1
PFP	1	New
This lists parties that won seats. See the complete results below.
- Vice gubernatorial elections
- 5 provincial vice governors and 1 city vice mayor
Party	Seats	+/–
Nacionalista	2	+1
PFP	2	New
NUP	1	0
PDP–Laban	1	−1
This lists parties that won seats. See the complete results below.
- Provincial Board elections
- 50 provincial board members and 12 city councilors
Party	Seats	+/–
Nacionalista	14	+6
Lakas	12	+4
PFP	12	+12
NUP	11	0
PDP–Laban	8	−14
Akbayan	1	+1
Hugpong Surigao Sur	1	New
Independent	3	+2
This lists parties that won seats. See the complete results below.

The 2025 Philippine local elections in Caraga were held on May 12, 2025.

== Summary ==
=== Governors ===
Province/city	Incumbent	Incumbent's party	Winner	Winner's party	Winning margin
Agusan del Norte	Angelica Amante	PDP–Laban	Angelica Amante	PDP–Laban	94.38%
Agusan del Sur	Santiago Cane Jr.	NUP	Santiago Cane Jr.	NUP	71.34%
Butuan (HUC)	Ronnie Vicente Lagnada	Nacionalista	Lawrence Fortun	Nacionalista	18.60%
Dinagat Islands	Nilo Demerey Jr.	PFP	Nilo Demerey Jr.	PFP	21.92%
Surigao del Norte	Lyndon Barbers	Nacionalista	Lyndon Barbers	Nacionalista	1.59%
Surigao del Sur	Alexander Pimentel	PFP	Johnny Pimentel	NUP	42.09%

=== Vice governors ===
Province/city	Incumbent	Incumbent's party	Winner	Winner's party	Winning margin
Agusan del Norte	Rico Corvera	PDP–Laban	Rico Corvera	PDP–Laban	85.56%
Agusan del Sur	Sammy Tortor	NUP	Pat Plaza	NUP	Unopposed
Butuan (HUC)	Lawrence Fortun	Nacionalista	Rey Desiata	Nacionalista	Unopposed
Dinagat Islands	Benglen Ecleo	Lakas	Jade Ecleo	PFP	14.82%
Surigao del Norte	Geed Gokiangkee	Nacionalista	Geed Gokiangkee	Nacionalista	28.78%
Surigao del Sur	Mangi Alameda	PFP	Mangi Alameda	PFP	40.82%

=== Provincial boards ===
Province/city	Seats	Party control		Composition
Province/city	Seats	Previous	Result	Composition
Agusan del Norte	10 elected 4 ex-officio	PDP–Laban	PDP–Laban	PDP–Laban (8); Independent (2)
Agusan del Sur	10 elected 4 ex-officio	NUP	NUP	NUP (10)
Butuan (HUC)	12 elected 2 ex-officio	No majority	Nacionalista	Nacionalista (8); Lakas (3); NUP (1)
Dinagat Islands	10 elected 3 ex-officio	Lakas	No majority	Lakas (5); PFP (3); Akbayan (1); Independent (1)
Surigao del Norte	10 elected 3 ex-officio	PDP–Laban	No majority	Nacionalista (5); Lakas (4); PFP (1)
Surigao del Sur	10 elected 4 ex-officio	No majority	PFP	PFP (8); Hugpong Surigao Sur (1); Nacionalista (1)

== Agusan del Norte ==
=== Governor ===
Incumbent Governor Angelica Amante of the PDP–Laban ran for a second term.

Amante won re-election against Emon Peligrino (Independent).

Candidate	Party	Votes	%
Angelica Amante (incumbent)	PDP–Laban	192,145	97.19
Emon Peligrino	Independent	5,552	2.81
Total		197,697	100.00
Valid votes		197,697	88.68
Invalid/blank votes		25,225	11.32
Total votes		222,922	100.00
Registered voters/turnout		272,163	81.91
PDP–Laban hold			
Source: Commission on Elections

=== Vice Governor ===
Incumbent Vice Governor Rico Corvera of the PDP–Laban ran for a second term.

Corvera won re-election against Daniel Racaza (Independent).

Candidate	Party	Votes	%
Rico Corvera (incumbent)	PDP–Laban	168,556	92.78
Daniel Racaza	Independent	13,119	7.22
Total		181,675	100.00
Valid votes		181,675	81.50
Invalid/blank votes		41,247	18.50
Total votes		222,922	100.00
Registered voters/turnout		272,163	81.91
PDP–Laban hold			
Source: Commission on Elections

=== Provincial Board ===
Since Agusan del Norte's reclassification as a 1st class province in 2025, the Agusan del Norte Provincial Board is composed of 14 board members, 10 of whom are elected.

PDP–Laban won eight seats, maintaining its majority in the provincial board.

Party	Votes	%	Seats	+/–
PDP–Laban	518,915	74.33	8	0
Partido Federal ng Pilipinas	10,518	1.51	0	0
Independent	168,696	24.16	2	+2
Total	698,129	100.00	10	+2
Total votes	222,922	–		
Registered voters/turnout	272,163	81.91		
Source: Commission on Elections

==== 1st district ====
Since Agusan del Norte's redistricting in 2022, Agusan del Norte's 1st provincial district consists of the city of Cabadbaran and the municipalities of Jabonga, Kitcharao, Magallanes, Remedios T. Romualdez, Santiago and Tubay. Five board members are elected from this provincial district.

Eight candidates were included in the ballot.

Candidate	Party	Votes	%
Ryan Jade Lim (incumbent)	PDP–Laban	86,478	20.27
Nieva Famador (incumbent)	PDP–Laban	86,451	20.26
Rey Jamboy	PDP–Laban	85,032	19.93
Alan Asio	Independent	78,272	18.35
Randy Catarman	Independent	69,854	16.37
Napoleon Morales	Independent	8,539	2.00
Yancy Mongaya	Independent	6,155	1.44
Daniel Pantanosas	Independent	5,876	1.38
Total		426,657	100.00
Total votes		126,536	–
Registered voters/turnout		153,358	82.51
Source: Commission on Elections

==== 2nd district ====
Since Agusan del Norte's redistricting in 2022, Agusan del Norte's 2nd provincial district consists of the municipalities of Buenavista, Carmen, Las Nieves and Nasipit. Five board members are elected from this provincial district.

Six candidates were included in the ballot.

Candidate	Party	Votes	%
Francisco Chan Jr. (incumbent)	PDP–Laban	54,635	20.13
James Reserva (incumbent)	PDP–Laban	52,158	19.21
Erwin Dano (incumbent)	PDP–Laban	52,047	19.17
Virgilio Escasiñas	PDP–Laban	51,829	19.09
Rudy Pitogo (incumbent)	PDP–Laban	50,285	18.52
Juntex Tecson	Partido Federal ng Pilipinas	10,518	3.87
Total		271,472	100.00
Total votes		96,386	–
Registered voters/turnout		118,805	81.13
Source: Commission on Elections

== Agusan del Sur ==
=== Governor ===
Incumbent Governor Santiago Cane Jr. of the National Unity Party ran for a third term.

Cane won re-election against Edgard Engles (Independent).

Candidate	Party	Votes	%
Santiago Cane Jr. (incumbent)	National Unity Party	222,217	85.67
Edgard Engles	Independent	37,158	14.33
Total		259,375	100.00
Valid votes		259,375	72.50
Invalid/blank votes		98,380	27.50
Total votes		357,755	100.00
Registered voters/turnout		446,642	80.10
NUP hold			
Source: Commission on Elections

=== Vice Governor ===
Term-limited incumbent Vice Governor Sammy Tortor of the National Unity Party (NUP) ran for the Agusan del Sur Provincial Board in the 2nd provincial district.

The NUP nominated Pat Plaza, who won the election unopposed.

Candidate	Party	Votes	%
Pat Plaza	National Unity Party	214,614	100.00
Total		214,614	100.00
Valid votes		214,614	59.99
Invalid/blank votes		143,141	40.01
Total votes		357,755	100.00
Registered voters/turnout		446,642	80.10
NUP hold			
Source: Commission on Elections

=== Provincial Board ===
The Agusan del Sur Provincial Board is composed of 14 board members, 10 of whom are elected.

The National Unity Party won 10 seats, maintaining its majority in the provincial board.

Party	Votes	%	Seats	+/–
National Unity Party	821,494	97.74	10	0
Independent	18,957	2.26	0	New
Total	840,451	100.00	10	0
Total votes	357,755	–		
Registered voters/turnout	446,642	80.10		
Source: Commission on Elections

==== 1st district ====
Agusan del Sur's 1st provincial district consists of the same area as Agusan del Sur's 1st legislative district. Five board members are elected from this provincial district.

Five candidates were included in the ballot.

Candidate	Party	Votes	%
Cesar Alonde (incumbent)	National Unity Party	89,643	21.89
Gina Ceballos (incumbent)	National Unity Party	82,806	20.22
Jesryl Masendo (incumbent)	National Unity Party	80,671	19.70
Nilo Manpatilan (incumbent)	National Unity Party	78,516	19.17
Edgar Ga (incumbent)	National Unity Party	77,858	19.01
Total		409,494	100.00
Total votes		170,774	–
Registered voters/turnout		214,205	79.72
Source: Commission on Elections

==== 2nd district ====
Agusan del Sur's 2nd provincial district consists of the same area as Agusan del Sur's 2nd legislative district. Five board members are elected from this provincial district.

Six candidates were included in the ballot.

Candidate	Party	Votes	%
Sammy Tortor	National Unity Party	91,033	21.12
Cox Elorde (incumbent)	National Unity Party	84,667	19.65
Joseph Plaza (incumbent)	National Unity Party	83,545	19.39
Pamela Yucosing (incumbent)	National Unity Party	79,623	18.48
Valot Cejas (incumbent)	National Unity Party	73,132	16.97
Mickel Alfanta	Independent	18,957	4.40
Total		430,957	100.00
Total votes		186,981	–
Registered voters/turnout		232,437	80.44
Source: Commission on Elections

== Butuan ==
=== Mayor ===
Incumbent Mayor Ronnie Vicente Lagnada of the Nacionalista Party is term-limited.

The Nacionalista Party nominated Butuan vice mayor Lawrence Fortun, who won the election against former Philippine Economic Zone Authority director general Charito Plaza (Partido Federal ng Pilipinas), and three other candidates.

Candidate	Party	Votes	%
Lawrence Fortun	Nacionalista Party	101,345	58.86
Charito Plaza	Partido Federal ng Pilipinas	69,323	40.26
Florencio Bunal Jr.	Independent	1,167	0.68
Dickston Morano Sr.	Independent	197	0.11
Danie Boy Cublan	Independent	155	0.09
Total		172,187	100.00
Valid votes		172,187	95.27
Invalid/blank votes		8,558	4.73
Total votes		180,745	100.00
Registered voters/turnout		220,694	81.90
Nacionalista hold			
Source: Commission on Elections

=== Vice Mayor ===
Incumbent Vice Mayor Lawrence Fortun of the Nacionalista Party ran for mayor of Butuan.

The Nacionalista Party nominated city councilor Rey Desiasta, who won the election unopposed.

Candidate	Party	Votes	%
Rey Desiata	Nacionalista Party	112,514	100.00
Total		112,514	100.00
Valid votes		112,514	62.25
Invalid/blank votes		68,231	37.75
Total votes		180,745	100.00
Registered voters/turnout		220,694	81.90
Nacionalista hold			
Source: Commission on Elections

=== City Council ===
Since Butuan's redistricting in 2022, the Butuan City Council is composed of 14 councilors, 12 of whom are elected.

25 candidates were included in the ballot.

The Nacionalista Party won eight seats, gaining a majority in the city council.

Party	Votes	%	Seats	+/–
Nacionalista Party	706,399	51.48	8	+2
Lakas–CMD	298,574	21.76	3	+1
Partido Federal ng Pilipinas	161,611	11.78	0	New
National Unity Party	90,668	6.61	1	0
Independent	114,862	8.37	0	–1
Total	1,372,114	100.00	12	+2
Total votes	180,745	–		
Registered voters/turnout	220,694	81.90		
Source: Commission on Elections

Candidate	Party	Votes	%
Glenn Carampatana	Lakas–CMD	112,841	8.22
Ferdinand Nalcot	Lakas–CMD	106,126	7.73
Rema Burdeos	Nacionalista Party	95,121	6.93
Carlo Sanchez	Nacionalista Party	93,533	6.82
Victor Plaza (incumbent)	National Unity Party	90,668	6.61
Dennis Bacala	Nacionalista Party	88,422	6.44
Arturo Gado (incumbent)	Nacionalista Party	86,968	6.34
Clint Dabalos	Nacionalista Party	84,228	6.14
Dendo Udarbe	Nacionalista Party	82,458	6.01
Ronaldo Montero	Nacionalista Party	81,856	5.97
TG Salcedo	Lakas–CMD	79,607	5.80
Marlon Labis	Nacionalista Party	72,083	5.25
Jason Radaza	Partido Federal ng Pilipinas	32,869	2.40
Denz Basubas	Partido Federal ng Pilipinas	31,331	2.28
Jo Montefalcon	Partido Federal ng Pilipinas	28,924	2.11
Florito Dugaduga	Independent	28,594	2.08
Buds Cupin	Partido Federal ng Pilipinas	25,661	1.87
Benson Leleng	Independent	23,306	1.70
Eduardo Gonzalez (incumbent)	Nacionalista Party	21,730	1.58
Audie Munda	Partido Federal ng Pilipinas	21,612	1.58
Jessie Tioaquen	Independent	21,314	1.55
Temoteo Pableo	Partido Federal ng Pilipinas	21,214	1.55
Neneng Nueza	Independent	19,304	1.41
Joel Calimbo	Independent	11,207	0.82
Oscar Buyan Jr.	Independent	11,137	0.81
Total		1,372,114	100.00
Total votes		180,745	–
Registered voters/turnout		220,694	81.90
Source: Commission on Elections

== Dinagat Islands ==
=== Governor ===
Incumbent Governor Nilo Demerey Jr. of the Partido Federal ng Pilipinas ran for a second term. He was previously affiliated with Lakas–CMD.

Demerey won re-election against Sonny Llamera (Independent).

Candidate	Party	Votes	%
Nilo Demerey Jr. (incumbent)	Partido Federal ng Pilipinas	41,679	60.96
Sonny Llamera	Independent	26,694	39.04
Total		68,373	100.00
Valid votes		68,373	96.26
Invalid/blank votes		2,660	3.74
Total votes		71,033	100.00
Registered voters/turnout		81,673	86.97
PFP hold			
Source: Commission on Elections

=== Vice Governor ===
Incumbent Vice Governor Benglen Ecleo of Lakas–CMD ran for a second term.

Ecleo was defeated by his sister, former Dinagat Islands governor Jade Ecleo of the Partido Federal ng Pilipinas.

Candidate	Party	Votes	%
Jade Ecleo	Partido Federal ng Pilipinas	36,069	57.41
Benglen Ecleo (incumbent)	Lakas–CMD	26,758	42.59
Total		62,827	100.00
Valid votes		62,827	88.45
Invalid/blank votes		8,206	11.55
Total votes		71,033	100.00
Registered voters/turnout		81,673	86.97
PFP gain from Lakas			
Source: Commission on Elections

=== Provincial Board ===
Since the Dinagat Islands' reclassification as a 2nd class province in 2025, the Dinagat Islands Provincial Board is composed of 13 board members, 10 of whom are elected.

Lakas–CMD remained as the largest party in the provincial board with five seats, but lost its majority.

Party	Votes	%	Seats	+/–
Lakas–CMD	110,880	44.75	5	–1
Partido Federal ng Pilipinas	78,452	31.66	3	New
Akbayan	30,295	12.23	1	+1
Independent	28,132	11.35	1	+1
Total	247,759	100.00	10	+2
Total votes	71,033	–		
Registered voters/turnout	81,673	86.97		
Source: Commission on Elections

==== 1st district ====
Dinagat Islands' 1st provincial district consists of the municipalities of Basilisa, Libjo, Loreto and Tubajon. Six board members are elected from this provincial district.

Nine candidates were included in the ballot.

Candidate	Party	Votes	%
Ali Adlawan (incumbent)	Lakas–CMD	24,288	16.74
Kaloy Bua (incumbent)	Partido Federal ng Pilipinas	19,804	13.65
Nilo Marco Demerey	Partido Federal ng Pilipinas	18,624	12.83
Lyn Dialde (incumbent)	Akbayan	18,002	12.41
Toto Vales	Lakas–CMD	16,186	11.15
Ronald Luib Sr.	Lakas–CMD	15,788	10.88
Jo Bucio-Relator (incumbent)	Partido Federal ng Pilipinas	14,582	10.05
Zaldy Merano	Lakas–CMD	14,055	9.69
Weng Weng Ebra	Independent	3,783	2.61
Total		145,112	100.00
Total votes		37,808	–
Registered voters/turnout		43,293	87.33
Source: Commission on Elections

==== 2nd district ====
Dinagat Islands' 2nd provincial district consists of the municipalities of Cagdianao, Dinagat and San Jose. Four board members are elected from this provincial district.

12 candidates were included in the ballot.

Candidate	Party	Votes	%
Ailong dela Cruz (incumbent)	Independent	17,184	16.74
Jaypee Espares	Lakas–CMD	13,141	12.80
Debbie Durano	Partido Federal ng Pilipinas	13,024	12.69
Al Tugay	Lakas–CMD	12,538	12.21
Sean Eludo	Akbayan	12,293	11.98
Gwendolyn Ecleo-Pols (incumbent)	Lakas–CMD	9,313	9.07
Elvis dela Merced	Partido Federal ng Pilipinas	7,384	7.19
Nono Nicolas	Lakas–CMD	5,571	5.43
Jess Paul Ecleo	Partido Federal ng Pilipinas	5,034	4.90
Rochelyn Libor	Independent	4,013	3.91
Wilfredo Tiu	Independent	2,375	2.31
Antonio Acabal	Independent	777	0.76
Total		102,647	100.00
Total votes		33,225	–
Registered voters/turnout		38,380	86.57
Source: Commission on Elections

== Surigao del Norte ==
=== Governor ===
Incumbent Governor Lyndon Barbers of the Nacionalista Party ran for a second term.

Barbers won re-election against representative Francisco Jose Matugas II (Lakas–CMD) and Emeteria Vega (Independent).

Candidate	Party	Votes	%
Lyndon Barbers (incumbent)	Nacionalista Party	174,675	50.49
Francisco Jose Matugas II	Lakas–CMD	169,181	48.90
Emeteria Vega	Independent	2,113	0.61
Total		345,969	100.00
Valid votes		345,969	95.61
Invalid/blank votes		15,891	4.39
Total votes		361,860	100.00
Registered voters/turnout		407,056	88.90
Nacionalista hold			
Source: Commission on Elections

=== Vice Governor ===
Incumbent Vice Governor Geed Gokiangkee of the Nacionalista Party ran for a third term. He was previously affiliated with PDP–Laban.

Gokiangkee won re-election against provincial board member Bully Navarro IV (Lakas–CMD).

Candidate	Party	Votes	%
Geed Gokiangkee (incumbent)	Nacionalista Party	214,332	64.39
Bully Navarro IV	Lakas–CMD	118,520	35.61
Total		332,852	100.00
Valid votes		332,852	91.98
Invalid/blank votes		29,008	8.02
Total votes		361,860	100.00
Registered voters/turnout		407,056	88.90
Nacionalista hold			
Source: Commission on Elections

=== Provincial Board ===
The Surigao del Norte Provincial Board is composed of 13 board members, 10 of whom are elected.

The Nacionalista Party won five seats, becoming the largest party in the provincial board.

Party	Votes	%	Seats	+/–
Nacionalista Party	613,182	46.96	5	+3
Lakas–CMD	523,511	40.09	4	New
PDP–Laban	55,307	4.24	0	–8
Partido Federal ng Pilipinas	36,406	2.79	1	New
National Unity Party	29,784	2.28	0	New
Independent	47,600	3.65	0	0
Total	1,305,790	100.00	10	0
Total votes	361,860	–		
Registered voters/turnout	407,056	88.90		
Source: Commission on Elections

==== 1st district ====
Surigao del Norte's 1st provincial district consists of the same area as Surigao del Norte's 1st legislative district. Five board members are elected from this provincial district.

14 candidates were included in the ballot.

Candidate	Party	Votes	%
Vic Vic Solloso	Lakas–CMD	44,165	11.21
John Cubillan	Nacionalista Party	42,911	10.89
Aiken Andanar	Lakas–CMD	36,915	9.37
Cathy Gopico (incumbent)	Partido Federal ng Pilipinas	36,406	9.24
Julecs Sunico	Lakas–CMD	35,380	8.98
Sim Castrence (incumbent)	Lakas–CMD	33,169	8.42
Paola Alvarez	Nacionalista Party	30,243	7.67
Teodocio Mosquito	Lakas–CMD	29,805	7.56
Zander Plaza	National Unity Party	29,784	7.56
Peter Jade Ruaya	Nacionalista Party	29,307	7.44
Eric Arellano	Nacionalista Party	22,747	5.77
John David Corpin	Independent	14,700	3.73
Azil Coro	Independent	5,258	1.33
Mayet Arcena	Independent	3,289	0.83
Total		394,079	100.00
Total votes		103,270	–
Registered voters/turnout		113,571	90.93
Source: Commission on Elections

==== 2nd district ====
Surigao del Norte's 2nd provincial district consists of the same area as Surigao del Norte's 2nd legislative district. Five board members are elected in this provincial district.

14 candidates were included in the ballot.

Candidate	Party	Votes	%
Noel Christian Catre	Nacionalista Party	111,908	12.27
Victor Bernal (incumbent)	Nacionalista Party	110,247	12.09
Pinggoy Patiño	Nacionalista Party	104,350	11.45
Jeff Larong (incumbent)	Lakas–CMD	89,227	9.79
Kaiser Recabo Jr. (incumbent)	Nacionalista Party	86,507	9.49
Yayo Charcos	Nacionalista Party	74,962	8.22
Kent Yuipco (incumbent)	Lakas–CMD	69,589	7.63
Mai Ugay	Lakas–CMD	66,439	7.29
Jerry Madera	Lakas–CMD	61,853	6.78
Val Lozada	Lakas–CMD	56,969	6.25
Jun Parada	PDP–Laban	36,345	3.99
Garry Simbit	PDP–Laban	18,962	2.08
Jun Jun Mantilla	Independent	15,305	1.68
Boboy Uriarte	Independent	9,048	0.99
Total		911,711	100.00
Total votes		258,590	–
Registered voters/turnout		293,485	88.11
Source: Commission on Elections

== Surigao del Sur ==
=== Governor ===
Incumbent Governor Alexander Pimentel of the Partido Federal ng Pilipinas ran for the House of Representatives in Surigao del Sur's 2nd legislative district. He was previously affiliated with PDP–Laban.

Pimentel endorsed his brother, representative Johnny Pimentel (National Unity Party), who won the election against former Department of Education undersecretary Epi Densing (Aksyon Demokratiko), and four other candidates.

Candidate	Party	Votes	%
Johnny Pimentel	National Unity Party	252,477	68.74
Epi Densing	Aksyon Demokratiko	97,884	26.65
Anecito Murillo	Independent	6,928	1.89
Mario Lumanao	Independent	3,521	0.96
Mitchel Urbiztondo	Independent	3,247	0.88
Joseph Arniego	Independent	3,223	0.88
Total		367,280	100.00
Valid votes		367,280	87.70
Invalid/blank votes		51,507	12.30
Total votes		418,787	100.00
Registered voters/turnout		476,689	87.85
NUP gain from PFP			
Source: Commission on Elections

=== Vice Governor ===
Incumbent Vice Governor Mangi Alameda of the Partido Federal ng Pilipinas ran for a second term. He was previously affiliated with Hugpong Surigao.

Alameda won re-election against Ricky Lindo (Independent).

Candidate	Party	Votes	%
Mangi Alameda (incumbent)	Partido Federal ng Pilipinas	237,575	70.41
Ricky Lindo	Independent	99,822	29.59
Total		337,397	100.00
Valid votes		337,397	80.57
Invalid/blank votes		81,390	19.43
Total votes		418,787	100.00
Registered voters/turnout		476,689	87.85
PFP hold			
Source: Commission on Elections

=== Provincial Board ===
The Surigao del Sur Provincial Board is composed of 14 board members, 10 of whom are elected.

The Partido Federal ng Pilipinas won eight seats, gaining a majority in the provincial board.

Party	Votes	%	Seats	+/–
Partido Federal ng Pilipinas	830,828	58.71	8	New
Aksyon Demokratiko	372,180	26.30	0	New
Hugpong Surigao Sur	126,526	8.94	1	New
Nacionalista Party	85,550	6.05	1	New
Total	1,415,084	100.00	10	0
Total votes	418,787	–		
Registered voters/turnout	476,689	87.85		
Source: Commission on Elections

==== 1st district ====
Surigao del Sur's 1st provincial district consists of the same area as Surigao del Sur's 1st legislative district. Five board members are elected in this provincial district.

10 candidates were included in the ballot.

Candidate	Party	Votes	%
Wawing Momo (incumbent)	Partido Federal ng Pilipinas	149,615	17.91
Henrich Pimentel	Hugpong Surigao Sur	126,526	15.14
Junjun Dumagan (incumbent)	Partido Federal ng Pilipinas	117,083	14.01
Antonio Azarcon (incumbent)	Partido Federal ng Pilipinas	111,031	13.29
Lery Montesclaros (incumbent)	Partido Federal ng Pilipinas	96,729	11.58
Primo Murillo	Aksyon Demokratiko	66,798	7.99
Alan Pelenio	Aksyon Demokratiko	54,337	6.50
Kent Yubengsing	Aksyon Demokratiko	42,072	5.04
Pakits Plaza	Aksyon Demokratiko	36,387	4.36
Eddie Estal	Aksyon Demokratiko	34,929	4.18
Total		835,507	100.00
Total votes		242,266	–
Registered voters/turnout		276,452	87.63
Source: Commission on Elections

==== 2nd district ====
Surigao del Sur's 2nd provincial district consists of the same area as Surigao del Sur's 2nd legislative district. Five board members are elected in this provincial district.

10 candidates were included in the ballot.

Candidate	Party	Votes	%
Joey Pama	Partido Federal ng Pilipinas	102,510	17.69
Ricky Sayawan (incumbent)	Partido Federal ng Pilipinas	86,978	15.01
Margie Garay (incumbent)	Nacionalista Party	85,550	14.76
Tonton Cañedo (incumbent)	Partido Federal ng Pilipinas	84,996	14.67
Raul Salazar (incumbent)	Partido Federal ng Pilipinas	81,886	14.13
Rey Acilo	Aksyon Demokratiko	44,907	7.75
Inday Ligaya Villegas	Aksyon Demokratiko	36,326	6.27
Gringgo Mark Millan	Aksyon Demokratiko	28,161	4.86
Boycon Consuegra	Aksyon Demokratiko	16,118	2.78
Didit Montero	Aksyon Demokratiko	12,145	2.10
Total		579,577	100.00
Total votes		176,521	–
Registered voters/turnout		200,237	88.16
Source: Commission on Elections
