= 2022 Philippine local elections in Caraga =

- May 9, 2022
- Gubernatorial elections
- 5 provincial governors and 1 city mayor
| Party | Seats | +/– |
|---|---|---|
| Nacionalista | 2 | +1 |
| PDP–Laban | 2 | −1 |
| Lakas | 1 | New |
| NUP | 1 | 0 |
This lists parties that won seats. See the complete results below.
- Vice gubernatorial elections
- 5 provincial vice governors and 1 city vice mayor
| Party | Seats | +/– |
|---|---|---|
| PDP–Laban | 2 | −2 |
| Hugpong Surigao | 1 | New |
| Lakas | 1 | 0 |
| Nacionalista | 1 | +1 |
| NUP | 1 | 0 |
This lists parties that won seats. See the complete results below.
- Provincial Board elections
- 46 provincial board members and 10 city councilors
| Party | Seats | +/– |
|---|---|---|
| PDP–Laban | 22 | −8 |
| NUP | 11 | +1 |
| Lakas | 8 | +3 |
| Nacionalista | 8 | +2 |
| Hugpong Surigao | 4 | New |
| Liberal | 2 | +1 |
| Independent | 1 | −1 |
This lists parties that won seats. See the complete results below.

The 2022 Philippine local elections in Caraga were held on May 9, 2022.

== Summary ==
=== Governors ===
| Province/city | Incumbent | Incumbent's party | Winner | Winner's party | Winning margin |
|---|---|---|---|---|---|
| Agusan del Norte | Dale Corvera | PDP–Laban | Angelica Amante | PDP–Laban | 63.18% |
| Agusan del Sur | Santiago Cane Jr. | NUP | Santiago Cane Jr. | NUP | Unopposed |
| Butuan (HUC) | Ronnie Vicente Lagnada | Nacionalista | Ronnie Vicente Lagnada | Nacionalista | 25.84% |
| Dinagat Islands | Kaka Bag-ao | Liberal | Nilo Demerey Jr. | Lakas | 14.52% |
| Surigao del Norte | Francisco Matugas | PDP–Laban | Lyndon Barbers | Nacionalista | 5.75% |
| Surigao del Sur | Alexander Pimentel | PDP–Laban | Alexander Pimentel | PDP–Laban | 9.87% |

=== Vice governors ===
| Province/city | Incumbent | Incumbent's party | Winner | Winner's party | Winning margin |
|---|---|---|---|---|---|
| Agusan del Norte | Ramon Bungabong | PDP–Laban | Rico Corvera | PDP–Laban | Unopposed |
| Agusan del Sur | Sammy Tortor | NUP | Sammy Tortor | NUP | Unopposed |
| Butuan (HUC) | Jose Aquino II | Nacionalista | Lawrence Fortun | Nacionalista | 47.82% |
| Dinagat Islands | Nilo Demerey Jr. | Lakas | Benglen Ecleo | Lakas | 22.84% |
| Surigao del Norte | Geed Gokiangkee | PDP–Laban | Geed Gokiangkee | PDP–Laban | 22.44% |
| Surigao del Sur | Librado Navarro | Liberal | Mangi Alameda | Hugpong Surigao | 14.99% |

=== Provincial boards ===
| Province/city | Seats | Party control | | Composition |
| Province/city | Seats | Previous | Result | Composition |
|---|---|---|---|---|
| Agusan del Norte | 8 elected 4 ex-officio | PDP–Laban | PDP–Laban | PDP–Laban (8) |
| Agusan del Sur | 10 elected 4 ex-officio | NUP | NUP | NUP (10) |
| Butuan (HUC) | 10 elected 2 ex-officio | No majority | No majority | Nacionalista (6); Lakas (2); NUP (1); Independent (1) |
| Dinagat Islands | 8 elected 3 ex-officio | No majority | Lakas | Lakas (6); Liberal (2) |
| Surigao del Norte | 10 elected 3 ex-officio | PDP–Laban | PDP–Laban | PDP–Laban (8); Nacionalista (2) |
| Surigao del Sur | 10 elected 4 ex-officio | PDP–Laban | No majority | PDP–Laban (6); Hugpong Surigao (4) |

== Agusan del Norte ==
=== Governor ===
Incumbent Governor Dale Corvera of PDP–Laban ran for the House of Representatives in Agusan del Norte's 2nd legislative district.

PDP–Laban nominated representative Angelica Amante, who won the election against two other candidates.

| Candidate | Party | Votes | % |
|---|---|---|---|
| Angelica Amante | PDP–Laban | 166,971 | 81.10 |
| Liza Aquino | Independent | 36,896 | 17.92 |
| Cosme Dominise Jr. | Independent | 2,004 | 0.97 |
| Total | | 205,871 | 100.00 |
| Total votes | | 233,983 | – |
| Registered voters/turnout | | 276,221 | 84.71 |
| PDP–Laban hold | | | |
Source: Commission on Elections

=== Vice Governor ===
Term-limited incumbent Ramon Bungabong of PDP–Laban ran for vice mayor of Buenavista.

PDP–Laban nominated Rico Corvera, who won the election unopposed.

| Candidate | Party | Votes | % |
|---|---|---|---|
| Rico Corvera | PDP–Laban | 151,411 | 100.00 |
| Total | | 151,411 | 100.00 |
| Total votes | | 233,983 | – |
| Registered voters/turnout | | 276,221 | 84.71 |
| PDP–Laban hold | | | |
Source: Commission on Elections

=== Provincial Board ===
The Agusan del Norte Provincial Board is composed of 12 board members, eight of whom are elected.

The Partido Demokratiko Pilipino won eight seats, maintaining its majority in the provincial board.

| Party | Votes | % | Seats | +/– |
|---|---|---|---|---|
| PDP–Laban | 784,179 | 82.51 | 8 | 0 |
| Partido Federal ng Pilipinas | 137,876 | 14.51 | 0 | New |
| Independent | 28,358 | 2.98 | 0 | 0 |
| Total | 950,413 | 100.00 | 8 | 0 |
| Total votes | 233,983 | – | | |
| Registered voters/turnout | 276,221 | 84.71 | | |

==== 1st district ====
Agusan del Norte's 1st provincial district consists of the same areas as Agusan del Norte's 1st legislative district, excluding the city of Butuan. One board member is elected from this provincial district.

Two candidates were included in the ballot.

| Candidate | Party | Votes | % |
|---|---|---|---|
| Larry Bautista | PDP–Laban | 10,994 | 79.33 |
| Arvin Pareñas | Partido Federal ng Pilipinas | 2,865 | 20.67 |
| Total | | 13,859 | 100.00 |
| Total votes | | 17,973 | – |
| Registered voters/turnout | | 21,014 | 85.53 |
Source: Commission on Elections

==== 2nd district ====
Agusan del Norte's 2nd provincial district consists of the same area as Agusan del Norte's 2nd legislative district. Seven board members are elected from this provincial district.

12 candidates were included in the ballot.

| Candidate | Party | Votes | % |
|---|---|---|---|
| Nieva Famador (incumbent) | PDP–Laban | 114,495 | 12.23 |
| Ryan Jade Lim | PDP–Laban | 112,624 | 12.03 |
| Rudy Pitogo (incumbent) | PDP–Laban | 111,717 | 11.93 |
| Erwin Dano (incumbent) | PDP–Laban | 110,820 | 11.83 |
| James Reserva (incumbent) | PDP–Laban | 109,115 | 11.65 |
| Dick Victor Carmona (incumbent) | PDP–Laban | 107,873 | 11.52 |
| Francisco Chan Jr. | PDP–Laban | 106,541 | 11.38 |
| Danracz Racaza | Partido Federal ng Pilipinas | 42,002 | 4.48 |
| Charlie David | Partido Federal ng Pilipinas | 34,104 | 3.64 |
| Vicente Talili | Partido Federal ng Pilipinas | 33,177 | 3.54 |
| Wilson Jade Baño | Independent | 28,358 | 3.03 |
| Emon Peligrino | Partido Federal ng Pilipinas | 25,728 | 2.75 |
| Total | | 936,554 | 100.00 |
| Total votes | | 216,010 | – |
| Registered voters/turnout | | 255,207 | 84.64 |
Source: Commission on Elections

== Agusan del Sur ==
=== Governor ===
Incumbent Governor Santiago Cane Jr. of the National Unity Party won re-election for a second term unopposed.

| Candidate | Party | Votes | % |
|---|---|---|---|
| Santiago Cane Jr. (incumbent) | National Unity Party | 258,786 | 100.00 |
| Total | | 258,786 | 100.00 |
| Total votes | | 364,989 | – |
| Registered voters/turnout | | 442,628 | 82.46 |
| NUP hold | | | |
Source: Commission on Elections

=== Vice Governor ===
Incumbent Vice Governor Sammy Tortor of the National Unity Party won re-election for a third term unopposed.

| Candidate | Party | Votes | % |
|---|---|---|---|
| Sammy Tortor (incumbent) | National Unity Party | 230,233 | 100.00 |
| Total | | 230,233 | 100.00 |
| Total votes | | 364,989 | – |
| Registered voters/turnout | | 442,628 | 82.46 |
| NUP hold | | | |
Source: Commission on Elections

=== Provincial Board ===
The Agusan del Sur Provincial Board is composed of 14 board members, 10 of whom are elected.

The National Unity Party won 10 seats, maintaining its majority in the provincial board.

| Party | Votes | % | Seats | +/– |
|---|---|---|---|---|
| National Unity Party | 914,397 | 100.00 | 10 | 0 |
| Total | 914,397 | 100.00 | 10 | 0 |
| Total votes | 364,989 | – | | |
| Registered voters/turnout | 442,628 | 82.46 | | |

==== 1st district ====
Agusan del Sur's 1st provincial district consists of the same area as Agusan del Sur's 1st legislative district. Five board members are elected from this provincial district.

Five candidates were included in the ballot.

| Candidate | Party | Votes | % |
|---|---|---|---|
| Cesar Alonde (incumbent) | National Unity Party | 93,444 | 21.93 |
| Gina Ceballos | National Unity Party | 85,664 | 20.10 |
| Jesryl Masendo (incumbent) | National Unity Party | 85,016 | 19.95 |
| Nilo Manpatilan (incumbent) | National Unity Party | 82,706 | 19.41 |
| Edgar Ga | National Unity Party | 79,296 | 18.61 |
| Total | | 426,126 | 100.00 |
| Total votes | | 174,060 | – |
| Registered voters/turnout | | 211,906 | 82.14 |
Source: Commission on Elections

==== 2nd district ====
Agusan del Sur's 2nd provincial district consists of the same area as Agusan del Sur's 2nd legislative district. Five board members are elected from this provincial district.

Five candidates were included in the ballot.

| Candidate | Party | Votes | % |
|---|---|---|---|
| Cox Elorde (incumbent) | National Unity Party | 102,822 | 21.06 |
| Joseph Plaza | National Unity Party | 99,815 | 20.44 |
| Allan Lim (incumbent) | National Unity Party | 96,145 | 19.69 |
| Pamela Yucosing (incumbent) | National Unity Party | 94,752 | 19.41 |
| Valot Cejas | National Unity Party | 94,737 | 19.40 |
| Total | | 488,271 | 100.00 |
| Total votes | | 190,929 | – |
| Registered voters/turnout | | 230,722 | 82.75 |
Source: Commission on Elections

== Butuan ==
=== Mayor ===
Incumbent Mayor Ronnie Vicente Lagnada of the Nacionalista Party ran for a third term.

Lagnada won re-election against former Buenavista, Agusan del Norte mayor Norbert Pagaspas (PDP–Laban) and two other candidates.

| Candidate | Party | Votes | % |
|---|---|---|---|
| Ronnie Vicente Lagnada (incumbent) | Nacionalista Party | 114,415 | 62.44 |
| Norbert Pagaspas | PDP–Laban | 67,068 | 36.60 |
| Edward Chan | Independent | 1,212 | 0.66 |
| Myrna Bernados | Independent | 542 | 0.30 |
| Total | | 183,237 | 100.00 |
| Total votes | | 194,558 | – |
| Registered voters/turnout | | 225,895 | 86.13 |
| Nacionalista hold | | | |
Source: Commission on Elections

=== Vice Mayor ===
Incumbent Vice Mayor Jose Aquino II of Lakas–CMD ran for the House of Representatives in Agusan del Norte's 1st legislative district.

Agusan del Norte's 1st district representative Lawrence Fortun of the Nacionalista Party won the election against two other candidates.

| Candidate | Party | Votes | % |
|---|---|---|---|
| Lawrence Fortun | Nacionalista Party | 121,691 | 73.28 |
| Dolly Veraque | PDP–Laban | 42,278 | 25.46 |
| Carlos Tan Jr. | Independent | 2,100 | 1.26 |
| Total | | 166,069 | 100.00 |
| Total votes | | 194,558 | – |
| Registered voters/turnout | | 225,895 | 86.13 |
| Nacionalista gain from Lakas | | | |
Source: Commission on Elections

=== City Council ===
The Butuan City Council is composed of 12 councilors, 10 of whom are elected.

38 candidates were included in the ballot.

The Nacionalista Party won six seats, becoming the largest party in the city council.

| Party | Votes | % | Seats | +/– |
|---|---|---|---|---|
| Nacionalista Party | 521,434 | 36.19 | 6 | +1 |
| PDP–Laban | 411,825 | 28.58 | 0 | 0 |
| Lakas–CMD | 214,756 | 14.91 | 2 | –3 |
| National Unity Party | 80,532 | 5.59 | 1 | New |
| Liberal Party | 14,758 | 1.02 | 0 | New |
| Workers' and Peasants' Party | 12,798 | 0.89 | 0 | New |
| Independent | 184,664 | 12.82 | 1 | +1 |
| Total | 1,440,767 | 100.00 | 10 | 0 |
| Total votes | 194,558 | – | | |
| Registered voters/turnout | 225,895 | 86.13 | | |

| Candidate | Party | Votes | % |
|---|---|---|---|
| Omar Andaya (incumbent) | Nacionalista Party | 96,691 | 6.71 |
| Cromwell Nortega (incumbent) | Lakas–CMD | 95,740 | 6.65 |
| Rey Desiasta | Nacionalista Party | 89,608 | 6.22 |
| John Gil Unay Sr. (incumbent) | Nacionalista Party | 87,498 | 6.07 |
| Cherry May Busa (incumbent) | Nacionalista Party | 86,593 | 6.01 |
| Ehrnest John Sanchez (incumbent) | Nacionalista Party | 81,644 | 5.67 |
| Vincent Rizal Rosario (incumbent) | Lakas–CMD | 80,965 | 5.62 |
| Victor Plaza | National Unity Party | 80,532 | 5.59 |
| Eduardo Gonzalez | Nacionalista Party | 79,400 | 5.51 |
| Arturo Gado | Independent | 75,178 | 5.22 |
| Ramon Carampatana | PDP–Laban | 65,899 | 4.57 |
| Dino Sanchez | PDP–Laban | 54,762 | 3.80 |
| Aljon Azote | PDP–Laban | 50,483 | 3.50 |
| Dodo Cembrano | Independent | 48,023 | 3.33 |
| Rene Guevarra | PDP–Laban | 44,313 | 3.08 |
| Denz Basubas | PDP–Laban | 42,562 | 2.95 |
| Jonathan Sarmiento | PDP–Laban | 38,981 | 2.71 |
| Glenn Carampatana | Lakas–CMD | 38,051 | 2.64 |
| Elesio Cambray | PDP–Laban | 36,274 | 2.52 |
| Bebie Podadera | PDP–Laban | 34,745 | 2.41 |
| Efrain Oropel | PDP–Laban | 33,765 | 2.34 |
| Edmundo Calo | Liberal Party | 14,758 | 1.02 |
| Romeo Catalan | Workers' and Peasants' Party | 12,798 | 0.89 |
| Venusto Clarito Jr. | Independent | 10,284 | 0.71 |
| Patrick Go | PDP–Laban | 10,041 | 0.70 |
| Rodolfo Rosales | Independent | 9,422 | 0.65 |
| Jason Radaza | Independent | 8,371 | 0.58 |
| Benjamin Duro | Independent | 3,807 | 0.26 |
| Joel Detalo | Independent | 3,711 | 0.26 |
| Oca Buyan | Independent | 3,398 | 0.24 |
| Arsolo Omac | Independent | 3,397 | 0.24 |
| Mak Mak Valeros | Independent | 3,192 | 0.22 |
| Nomeriano Samar Jr. | Independent | 3,059 | 0.21 |
| Jessie Avergonzado | Independent | 2,891 | 0.20 |
| Datu Manputian Ganza | Independent | 2,672 | 0.19 |
| Jeffrey Galicto | Independent | 2,642 | 0.18 |
| Panalang Dalomdom | Independent | 2,382 | 0.17 |
| Gonzalo Quillano | Independent | 2,235 | 0.16 |
| Total | | 1,440,767 | 100.00 |
| Total votes | | 194,558 | – |
| Registered voters/turnout | | 225,895 | 86.13 |
Source: Commission on Elections

== Dinagat Islands ==
=== Governor ===
Incumbent Governor Kaka Bag-ao of the Liberal Party ran for a second term.

Bag-ao was defeated by Dinagat Islands vice governor Nilo Demerey Jr. of Lakas–CMD.

| Candidate | Party | Votes | % |
|---|---|---|---|
| Nilo Demerey Jr. | Lakas–CMD | 34,906 | 57.26 |
| Kaka Bag-ao (incumbent) | Liberal Party | 26,055 | 42.74 |
| Total | | 60,961 | 100.00 |
| Total votes | | 66,558 | – |
| Registered voters/turnout | | 81,088 | 82.08 |
| Lakas gain from Liberal | | | |
Source: Commission on Elections

=== Vice Governor ===
Incumbent Vice Governor Nilo Demerey Jr. of Lakas–CMD ran for governor of Dinagat Islands. He was previously affiliated with PDP–Laban.

Lakas–CMD nominated former Dinagat Islands vice governor Benglen Ecleo, who won the election against Sanny Seco (Independent).

| Candidate | Party | Votes | % |
|---|---|---|---|
| Benglen Ecleo | Lakas–CMD | 33,326 | 61.42 |
| Sanny Seco | Independent | 20,937 | 38.58 |
| Total | | 54,263 | 100.00 |
| Total votes | | 66,558 | – |
| Registered voters/turnout | | 81,088 | 82.08 |
| Lakas hold | | | |
Source: Commission on Elections

=== Provincial Board ===
The Dinagat Islands Provincial Board is composed of 11 board members, eight of whom are elected.

Lakas–CMD won six seats, gaining a majority in the provincial board.

| Party | Votes | % | Seats | +/– |
|---|---|---|---|---|
| Lakas–CMD | 121,909 | 63.43 | 6 | New |
| Liberal Party | 58,225 | 30.29 | 2 | +1 |
| Akbayan | 9,028 | 4.70 | 0 | –1 |
| Independent | 3,039 | 1.58 | 0 | –2 |
| Total | 192,201 | 100.00 | 8 | 0 |
| Total votes | 66,558 | – | | |
| Registered voters/turnout | 81,088 | 82.08 | | |

==== 1st district ====
Dinagat Islands' 1st provincial district consists of the municipalities of Basilisa, Libjo, Loreto and Tubajon. Four board members are elected from this provincial district.

Eight candidates were included in the ballot.

| Candidate | Party | Votes | % |
|---|---|---|---|
| Ali Adlawan (incumbent) | Lakas–CMD | 20,920 | 21.24 |
| Carlos Bua (incumbent) | Lakas–CMD | 17,969 | 18.24 |
| Jo Bucio-Relator | Lakas–CMD | 15,479 | 15.71 |
| Lyn Dialde (incumbent) | Liberal Party | 14,340 | 14.56 |
| Korak Gealan | Lakas–CMD | 10,936 | 11.10 |
| Nelson Linaga | Liberal Party | 8,670 | 8.80 |
| Andrearte Olaco | Liberal Party | 5,750 | 5.84 |
| Leny Catadman | Liberal Party | 4,437 | 4.50 |
| Total | | 98,501 | 100.00 |
| Total votes | | 35,332 | – |
| Registered voters/turnout | | 42,652 | 82.84 |
Source: Commission on Elections

==== 2nd district ====
Dinagat Islands' 2nd provincial district consists of the municipalities of Cagdianao, Dinagat and San Jose. Four board members are elected from this provincial district.

10 candidates were included in the ballot.

| Candidate | Party | Votes | % |
|---|---|---|---|
| Ailong dela Cruz (incumbent) | Lakas–CMD | 19,759 | 21.09 |
| Amor Alcaria (incumbent) | Lakas–CMD | 15,353 | 16.39 |
| Gwen Ecleo-Pols (incumbent) | Lakas–CMD | 11,719 | 12.51 |
| Caloy Eludo | Liberal Party | 11,041 | 11.78 |
| Gingging Tabogon | Liberal Party | 9,855 | 10.52 |
| Joslyn Ecleo | Lakas–CMD | 9,774 | 10.43 |
| Noli Abis (incumbent) | Akbayan | 9,028 | 9.64 |
| Merly Dalisay-Lagroma | Liberal Party | 4,132 | 4.41 |
| Tony Acabal | Independent | 1,905 | 2.03 |
| Mariano Gerandoy | Independent | 1,134 | 1.21 |
| Total | | 93,700 | 100.00 |
| Total votes | | 31,226 | – |
| Registered voters/turnout | | 38,436 | 81.24 |
Source: Commission on Elections

== Surigao del Norte ==
=== Governor ===
Incumbent Governor Francisco Matugas of PDP–Laban ran for a second term.

Matugas was defeated by former Surigao del Norte governor Lyndon Barbers of the Nacionalista Party. Artemio Maquiso (Independent) also ran for governor.

| Candidate | Party | Votes | % |
|---|---|---|---|
| Lyndon Barbers | Nacionalista Party | 165,373 | 52.59 |
| Francisco Matugas (incumbent) | PDP–Laban | 147,291 | 46.84 |
| Artemio Maquiso | Independent | 1,797 | 0.57 |
| Total | | 314,461 | 100.00 |
| Total votes | | 340,772 | – |
| Registered voters/turnout | | 393,896 | 86.51 |
| Nacionalista gain from PDP–Laban | | | |
Source: Commission on Elections

=== Vice Governor ===
Incumbent Vice Governor Geed Gokiangkee of PDP–Laban ran for a second term.

Gokiangkee won re-election against two other candidates.

| Candidate | Party | Votes | % |
|---|---|---|---|
| Geed Gokiangkee (incumbent) | PDP–Laban | 174,363 | 60.36 |
| Noel Catre | Nacionalista Party | 109,544 | 37.92 |
| Ambrosio Ruaya Jr. | Independent | 4,952 | 1.71 |
| Total | | 288,859 | 100.00 |
| Total votes | | 340,772 | – |
| Registered voters/turnout | | 393,896 | 86.51 |
| PDP–Laban hold | | | |
Source: Commission on Elections

=== Provincial Board ===
The Surigao del Norte Provincial Board is composed of 13 board members, 10 of whom are elected.

The PDP–Laban won eight seats, maintaining its majority in the provincial board.

| Party | Votes | % | Seats | +/– |
|---|---|---|---|---|
| PDP–Laban | 616,837 | 57.57 | 8 | –1 |
| Nacionalista Party | 420,307 | 39.23 | 2 | +1 |
| Independent | 34,269 | 3.20 | 0 | 0 |
| Total | 1,071,413 | 100.00 | 10 | 0 |
| Total votes | 340,772 | – | | |
| Registered voters/turnout | 393,896 | 86.51 | | |

==== 1st district ====
Surigao del Norte's 1st provincial district consists of the same area as Surigao del Norte's 1st legislative district. Five board members are elected from this provincial district.

12 candidates were included in the ballot.

| Candidate | Party | Votes | % |
|---|---|---|---|
| Bully Navarro (incumbent) | PDP–Laban | 44,922 | 14.54 |
| Sonny Boy Andanar (incumbent) | PDP–Laban | 39,111 | 12.66 |
| Dongdong Plaza (incumbent) | PDP–Laban | 35,880 | 11.62 |
| Julecs Sunico (incumbent) | PDP–Laban | 32,170 | 10.42 |
| Cathy Gopico | Nacionalista Party | 31,743 | 10.28 |
| Guiller Boncaros (incumbent) | PDP–Laban | 30,068 | 9.74 |
| Dalisay Noguerra-Maitem | Nacionalista Party | 22,308 | 7.22 |
| Janit Nier | Independent | 20,974 | 6.79 |
| Doroteo Galavia | Nacionalista Party | 19,636 | 6.36 |
| Arnel Pospia | Nacionalista Party | 18,757 | 6.07 |
| Paja Congreso | Independent | 8,150 | 2.64 |
| Ricardo Libay | Independent | 5,145 | 1.67 |
| Total | | 308,864 | 100.00 |
| Total votes | | 91,992 | – |
| Registered voters/turnout | | 104,691 | 87.87 |
Source: Commission on Elections

==== 2nd district ====
Surigao del Norte's 2nd provincial district consists of the same area as Surigao del Norte's 2nd legislative district. Five board members are elected in this provincial district.

10 candidates were included in the ballot.

| Candidate | Party | Votes | % |
|---|---|---|---|
| Jeff Larong (incumbent) | PDP–Laban | 101,050 | 13.25 |
| Elvira Egay (incumbent) | PDP–Laban | 93,296 | 12.23 |
| Kent Yuipco | PDP–Laban | 86,090 | 11.29 |
| Victor Bernal | Nacionalista Party | 85,034 | 11.15 |
| Kaiser Recabo Jr. | PDP–Laban | 81,107 | 10.64 |
| Sim Castrence | PDP–Laban | 73,143 | 9.59 |
| Vicente Beberino Jr. | Nacionalista Party | 67,809 | 8.89 |
| Doreen Servillas | Nacionalista Party | 64,153 | 8.41 |
| Allan Lambus | Nacionalista Party | 56,511 | 7.41 |
| Boboy Uriarte | Nacionalista Party | 54,356 | 7.13 |
| Total | | 762,549 | 100.00 |
| Total votes | | 248,780 | – |
| Registered voters/turnout | | 289,205 | 86.02 |
Source: Commission on Elections

== Surigao del Sur ==
=== Governor ===
Incumbent Governor Alexander Pimentel of PDP–Laban ran for a second term.

Pimentel won re-election against two other candidates.

| Candidate | Party | Votes | % |
|---|---|---|---|
| Alexander Pimentel (incumbent) | PDP–Laban | 195,606 | 53.81 |
| Carla Pichay | Lakas–CMD | 159,746 | 43.94 |
| Johnny Pimentel | Partido Demokratiko Sosyalista ng Pilipinas | 8,194 | 2.25 |
| Total | | 363,546 | 100.00 |
| Total votes | | 393,874 | – |
| Registered voters/turnout | | 449,070 | 87.71 |
| PDP–Laban hold | | | |
Source: Commission on Elections

=== Vice Governor ===
Incumbent Vice Governor Librado Navarro of the Liberal Party ran for mayor of Bislig. He was previously affiliated with PDP–Laban.

Provincial board member Mangi Alameda (Hugpong Surigao) won the election against former Surigao del Sur governor Primo Murillo (Lakas–CMD) and five other candidates.

| Candidate | Party | Votes | % |
|---|---|---|---|
| Mangi Alameda | Hugpong Surigao | 160,009 | 48.01 |
| Primo Murillo | Lakas–CMD | 110,046 | 33.02 |
| Mange Alameda | National Unity Party | 28,044 | 8.41 |
| Reyjoy Alameda | Independent | 11,446 | 3.43 |
| Anecito Murillo | Independent | 10,239 | 3.07 |
| Nene Momo | Partido Demokratiko Sosyalista ng Pilipinas | 8,914 | 2.67 |
| Rogelio Murillo | Independent | 4,604 | 1.38 |
| Total | | 333,302 | 100.00 |
| Total votes | | 393,874 | – |
| Registered voters/turnout | | 449,070 | 87.71 |
| Hugpong Surigao hold | | | |
Source: Commission on Elections

=== Provincial Board ===
The Surigao del Sur Provincial Board is composed of 14 board members, 10 of whom are elected.

The PDP–Laban won six seats, becoming the largest party in the provincial board.

| Party | Votes | % | Seats | +/– |
|---|---|---|---|---|
| Lakas–CMD | 514,740 | 36.83 | 0 | New |
| PDP–Laban | 434,190 | 31.07 | 6 | –3 |
| Hugpong Surigao | 382,770 | 27.39 | 4 | New |
| PROMDI | 5,136 | 0.37 | 0 | New |
| Independent | 60,742 | 4.35 | 0 | 0 |
| Total | 1,397,578 | 100.00 | 10 | 0 |
| Total votes | 393,874 | – | | |
| Registered voters/turnout | 449,070 | 87.71 | | |

==== 1st district ====
Surigao del Sur's 1st provincial district consists of the same area as Surigao del Sur's 1st legislative district. Five board members are elected in this provincial district.

14 candidates were included in the ballot.

| Candidate | Party | Votes | % |
|---|---|---|---|
| Ruel Momo (incumbent) | Hugpong Surigao | 103,536 | 12.46 |
| Boy Layno | Hugpong Surigao | 100,350 | 12.07 |
| Tonyboy Azarcon | Hugpong Surigao | 96,883 | 11.66 |
| Valerio Montesclaros (incumbent) | Hugpong Surigao | 82,001 | 9.87 |
| Jun Jun Dumagan | PDP–Laban | 80,083 | 9.64 |
| Linda Arreza | Lakas–CMD | 65,859 | 7.92 |
| Alan Pelenio | Lakas–CMD | 64,258 | 7.73 |
| Kent Yubengsing | Lakas–CMD | 58,802 | 7.08 |
| Alvaro Elizalde | Lakas–CMD | 58,630 | 7.05 |
| Merlin Baure | Lakas–CMD | 54,837 | 6.60 |
| Teresita Donasco | Independent | 36,680 | 4.41 |
| Imelda Falcon | Independent | 22,100 | 2.66 |
| Jojo Mar Lumanao | PROMDI | 5,136 | 0.62 |
| Rey Collantes | Independent | 1,962 | 0.24 |
| Total | | 831,117 | 100.00 |
| Total votes | | 229,807 | – |
| Registered voters/turnout | | 260,806 | 88.11 |
Source: Commission on Elections

==== 2nd district ====
Surigao del Sur's 2nd provincial district consists of the same area as Surigao del Sur's 2nd legislative district. Five board members are elected in this provincial district.

10 candidates were included in the ballot.

| Candidate | Party | Votes | % |
|---|---|---|---|
| Conrad Cejoco (incumbent) | PDP–Laban | 80,842 | 14.27 |
| Margie Garay (incumbent) | PDP–Laban | 72,364 | 12.77 |
| Ricky Sayawan (incumbent) | PDP–Laban | 69,984 | 12.35 |
| Tonton Cañedo | PDP–Laban | 68,126 | 12.03 |
| Raul Salazar | PDP–Laban | 62,791 | 11.08 |
| Romy Cacayan | Lakas–CMD | 50,543 | 8.92 |
| Donell Polizon | Lakas–CMD | 50,079 | 8.84 |
| Rening Nazareno (incumbent) | Lakas–CMD | 48,797 | 8.61 |
| Jerry Austria | Lakas–CMD | 31,845 | 5.62 |
| Mark San Pablo | Lakas–CMD | 31,090 | 5.49 |
| Total | | 566,461 | 100.00 |
| Total votes | | 164,067 | – |
| Registered voters/turnout | | 188,264 | 87.15 |
Source: Commission on Elections
