= 2010 Caraga local elections =

Local elections were held in Caraga on May 10, 2010, as part of the 2010 Philippine general election.

== Agusan del Norte ==
=== Governor ===
Incumbent governor Erlpe John Amante of Lakas–Kampi–CMD won re-election to a third term.

Candidate	Party	Votes	%
Erlpe John Amante	Lakas–Kampi–CMD	113,010	80.50
Roger Patanao	Independent	27,370	19.50
Total		140,380	100.00
Valid votes		140,380	87.71
Invalid/blank votes		19,670	12.29
Total votes		160,050	100.00
Lakas–Kampi–CMD hold			
Source: Commission on Elections

=== Vice governor ===
Incumbent vice governor Enrico Corvera of Lakas–Kampi–CMD was re-elected to a second term.

Candidate	Party	Votes	%
Enrico Corvera	Lakas–Kampi–CMD	98,038	76.14
Mercedes Atupan	Independent	30,726	23.86
Total		128,764	100.00
Valid votes		128,764	80.45
Invalid/blank votes		31,286	19.55
Total votes		160,050	100.00
Lakas–Kampi–CMD hold			
Source: Commission on Elections

=== Provincial board ===
The Agusan del Norte Provincial Board is composed of 11 board members, 8 of whom are elected.

Party	Votes	%	Seats
Lakas–Kampi–CMD	445,111	76.73	8
Nacionalista Party	27,559	4.75	0
Independent	107,463	18.52	0
Total	580,133	100.00	8
Total votes	160,050	–	
Source: Commission on Elections

==== 1st district ====
Candidate	Party	Votes	%
Fortunato Rosales	Lakas–Kampi–CMD	5,211	50.11
Virgilio Escasiñas Jr.	Independent	5,189	49.89
Total		10,400	100.00
Total votes		11,623	–
Source: Commission on Elections

==== 2nd district ====
Candidate	Party	Votes	%
Joseph Tomaneng	Lakas–Kampi–CMD	71,801	12.60
Aquino Gambe	Lakas–Kampi–CMD	68,690	12.06
Rey Jamboy	Lakas–Kampi–CMD	65,460	11.49
James Reserva	Lakas–Kampi–CMD	65,434	11.49
Lorito Maragañas	Lakas–Kampi–CMD	58,207	10.22
Rodulfo Pitogo	Lakas–Kampi–CMD	56,100	9.85
Daniel Racaza	Lakas–Kampi–CMD	54,208	9.51
Jennifer Patanao	Independent	30,019	5.27
Richard John Ranario	Independent	19,614	3.44
Roldan Cebrian	Independent	18,679	3.28
Nelly Gatilogo	Nacionalista Party	15,703	2.76
Dominador Hijos	Independent	14,835	2.60
Joey Edgar Sajor Jr.	Independent	13,462	2.36
Macnell Lusotan	Nacionalista Party	11,856	2.08
Gines Edera	Independent	5,665	0.99
Total		569,733	100.00
Total votes		148,427	–
Source: Commission on Elections

== Agusan del Sur ==
=== Governor ===
Incumbent governor Maria Valentina Plaza of Lakas–Kampi–CMD ran for the House of Representatives in Agusan del Sur's 1st district. Lakas–Kampi–CMD nominated former governor Eddiebong Plaza, who won the election.

Candidate	Party	Votes	%
Eddiebong Plaza	Lakas–Kampi–CMD	150,754	67.49
Isoceles Otero	Liberal Party	70,893	31.74
Dominador Miolata	Independent	1,723	0.77
Total		223,370	100.00
Valid votes		223,370	88.12
Invalid/blank votes		30,107	11.88
Total votes		253,477	100.00
Lakas–Kampi–CMD hold			
Source: ibanangayon.ph

=== Vice governor ===
Incumbent vice governor Santiago Cane Jr. of Lakas–Kampi–CMD was re-elected to a second term.

Candidate	Party	Votes	%
Santiago Cane Jr.	Lakas–Kampi–CMD	124,765	66.31
Timoteo Prochina	Liberal Party	63,379	33.69
Total		188,144	100.00
Valid votes		188,144	74.23
Invalid/blank votes		65,333	25.77
Total votes		253,477	100.00
Lakas–Kampi–CMD hold			
Source: ibanangayon.ph

=== Provincial board ===
The Agusan del Sur Provincial Board is composed of 14 board members, 10 of whom are elected.

Party	Votes	%	Seats
Lakas–Kampi–CMD	504,966	66.21	9
Liberal Party	177,569	23.28	0
Independent	80,147	10.51	1
Total	762,682	100.00	10
Total votes	253,477	–	
Source: ibanangayon.ph

==== 1st district ====
Candidate	Party	Votes	%
Cesar Alonde	Lakas–Kampi–CMD	58,067	15.02
Allan Santiago	Lakas–Kampi–CMD	57,944	14.99
Virginia Getes	Lakas–Kampi–CMD	52,560	13.60
Nestor Corvera	Lakas–Kampi–CMD	50,884	13.17
Victor Plaza	Independent	40,405	10.45
Romeo dela Torre	Lakas–Kampi–CMD	31,907	8.26
Gilbert Honculada	Independent	31,245	8.08
Vicente Encendencia	Liberal Party	25,873	6.69
Rafael Ybañez	Liberal Party	15,861	4.10
Lucino Buron	Liberal Party	11,086	2.87
Jerson Albiva	Liberal Party	10,677	2.76
Total		386,509	100.00
Total votes		127,170	–
Source: ibanangayon.ph

==== 2nd district ====
Candidate	Party	Votes	%
Jose Bunilla	Lakas–Kampi–CMD	60,435	16.07
Gilbert Elorde	Lakas–Kampi–CMD	56,549	15.03
Emmanuel Dairo	Lakas–Kampi–CMD	47,091	12.52
Samuel Tortor	Lakas–Kampi–CMD	46,808	12.44
Agusani Ananoria	Lakas–Kampi–CMD	42,721	11.36
Joel Prochina	Liberal Party	27,948	7.43
Maximo Tutor	Liberal Party	27,599	7.34
Cyno Balmadres	Liberal Party	26,021	6.92
Anuncio Bustillo	Liberal Party	21,129	5.62
Herman Corro	Liberal Party	11,375	3.02
Mercurio Barrios	Independent	8,497	2.26
Total		376,173	100.00
Total votes		126,307	–
Source: ibanangayon.ph

== Butuan ==
=== Mayor ===
Ferdinand Amante Jr. of the Liberal Party was elected as mayor.

Candidate	Party	Votes	%
Ferdinand Amante Jr.	Liberal Party	65,663	53.12
Leonides Theresa Plaza	Lakas–Kampi–CMD	56,763	45.92
Teodoro Emboy	Independent	500	0.40
Roberto Rosales	Lapiang Manggagawa	433	0.35
Romeo Buyan	Independent	261	0.21
Total		123,620	100.00
Valid votes		123,620	96.14
Invalid/blank votes		4,963	3.86
Total votes		128,583	100.00
Source: ibanangayon.ph

=== Vice mayor ===
Lawrence Fortun of the Liberal Party was elected as vice mayor.

Candidate	Party	Votes	%
Lawrence Fortun	Liberal Party	70,417	60.48
Dino Claudio Sanchez	Lakas–Kampi–CMD	44,771	38.45
James Biol	Independent	697	0.60
Nestor Makinano	Independent	547	0.47
Total		116,432	100.00
Valid votes		116,432	89.19
Invalid/blank votes		14,107	10.81
Total votes		130,539	100.00
Nacionalista Party gain from Liberal Party			
Source: ibanangayon.ph

=== City council ===
The Butuan City Council is composed of 12 city councilors, 10 of whom are elected.

Party	Votes	%	Seats
Lakas–Kampi–CMD	418,488	45.55	5
Liberal Party	390,418	42.49	5
Bagumbayan–VNP	28,958	3.15	0
Independent	80,877	8.80	0
Total	918,741	100.00	10
Total votes	130,539	–	
Source: ibanangayon.ph

Candidate	Party	Votes	%
Erwin Dano	Liberal Party	61,763	6.72
Ryan Anthony Culima	Liberal Party	57,657	6.28
Josephine Marticion-Salise	Lakas–Kampi–CMD	55,635	6.06
Angelo Calo	Liberal Party	54,970	5.98
Randolph Plaza	Lakas–Kampi–CMD	53,729	5.85
Ramon Carampatana	Lakas–Kampi–CMD	49,359	5.37
Audie Bernabe	Lakas–Kampi–CMD	48,232	5.25
Jaime Cembrano Jr.	Liberal Party	41,925	4.56
Raul Amoc	Lakas–Kampi–CMD	41,324	4.50
Virgilio Nery Jr.	Liberal Party	40,735	4.43
Rema Burdeos	Liberal Party	39,216	4.27
Ferdinand Nalcot	Liberal Party	39,108	4.26
Renato Guevarra	Lakas–Kampi–CMD	38,501	4.19
Danilo Sabijon	Lakas–Kampi–CMD	37,994	4.14
Jay Rivero	Liberal Party	36,837	4.01
Clementino Rabor	Lakas–Kampi–CMD	34,319	3.74
Lope Buñol	Lakas–Kampi–CMD	33,485	3.64
Titus Thaddeus Vesagas	Bagumbayan–VNP	28,958	3.15
Lancelot Padla	Lakas–Kampi–CMD	25,910	2.82
Romeo Catalan	Liberal Party	18,207	1.98
Horacio Lasam	Independent	15,930	1.73
Benhur Calo	Independent	10,990	1.20
Liberes Dumanon	Independent	8,828	0.96
Edward Chan	Independent	8,192	0.89
Ernesto Ruiz	Independent	7,300	0.79
Fredelino Labado	Independent	7,177	0.78
Rolando Carlota	Independent	6,683	0.73
Jovito Bermudez	Independent	3,603	0.39
Ramil Asunto	Independent	2,703	0.29
Melchizedek Linao	Independent	2,316	0.25
Mary Besa	Independent	2,214	0.24
Luis Florentino	Independent	2,169	0.24
Joselito Burnea	Independent	1,442	0.16
Magno Burnea	Independent	1,330	0.14
Total		918,741	100.00
Total votes		128,583	–
Source: ibanangayon.ph

== Dinagat Islands ==
=== Governor ===
Incumbent governor Jade Ecleo, an independent, ran for vice governor. Ecleo's mother, representative Glenda Ecleo of Lakas–Kampi–CMD, won the election.

Candidate	Party	Votes	%
Glenda Ecleo	Lakas–Kampi–CMD	33,895	87.08
Harry Meso	Liberal Party	5,029	12.92
Total		38,924	100.00
Valid votes		38,924	80.60
Invalid/blank votes		9,368	19.40
Total votes		48,292	100.00
Lakas–Kampi–CMD gain from Independent			
Source: Commission on Elections

=== Vice governor ===
Incumbent vice governor Elvis dela Merced of Lakas–Kampi–CMD ran for a second term, but was defeated by governor Jade Ecleo, an independent.

Candidate	Party	Votes	%
Jade Ecleo	Independent	23,077	53.77
Elvis dela Merced	Lakas–Kampi–CMD	19,388	45.17
Sangkil Park	Liberal Party	455	1.06
Total		42,920	100.00
Valid votes		42,920	88.88
Invalid/blank votes		5,372	11.12
Total votes		48,292	100.00
Independent gain from Lakas–Kampi–CMD			
Source: Commission on Elections

=== Provincial board ===
The Dinagat Islands Provincial Board is composed of 14 board members, 10 of whom are elected.

Party	Votes	%	Seats
Lakas–Kampi–CMD	103,982	72.41	10
Liberal Party	13,480	9.39	0
Independent	26,143	18.20	0
Total	143,605	100.00	10
Total votes	48,292	–	
Source: Commission on Elections

==== 1st district ====
Candidate	Party	Votes	%
Rolizareth Ladaga	Lakas–Kampi–CMD	11,292	17.04
Merlinda Lagroma	Lakas–Kampi–CMD	10,185	15.37
Floro Baltar Jr.	Lakas–Kampi–CMD	9,880	14.91
Richard Salcedo	Lakas–Kampi–CMD	9,099	13.73
Romeo Ecleo	Lakas–Kampi–CMD	8,988	13.57
George Edera	Independent	6,312	9.53
Aurora Pertos	Liberal Party	2,789	4.21
Agripino Baket Jr.	Liberal Party	2,493	3.76
Leonardo Bag-ao	Liberal Party	2,366	3.57
Haarel Meso	Liberal Party	1,676	2.53
Nelson Rubio	Liberal Party	1,174	1.77
Total		66,254	100.00
Total votes		25,562	–
Source: Commission on Elections

==== 2nd district ====
Candidate	Party	Votes	%
Joslyn Ecleo	Lakas–Kampi–CMD	13,814	17.86
Mario Menil	Lakas–Kampi–CMD	10,882	14.07
Nilo Gulfo	Lakas–Kampi–CMD	10,401	13.45
Bernardino Alcaria Jr.	Lakas–Kampi–CMD	9,749	12.60
Norberto Sarita Sr.	Lakas–Kampi–CMD	9,692	12.53
Jurry Ecleo	Independent	5,760	7.45
Lourdes Ecleo	Independent	5,505	7.12
Sanny Seco	Independent	4,921	6.36
Eduardo Mas-ing	Independent	3,645	4.71
Roberto Lancin	Liberal Party	976	1.26
Nicolas Llamera	Liberal Party	754	0.97
Bonifacio Gamal	Liberal Party	534	0.69
Wenefredo Gases	Liberal Party	412	0.53
Remy Hernandez	Liberal Party	306	0.40
Total		77,351	100.00
Total votes		22,730	–
Source: Commission on Elections

== Surigao del Norte ==
=== Governor ===
Incumbent governor Ace Barbers of the Nacionalista Party ran for a second term. Barbers was defeated by Sol Matugas of Lakas–Kampi–CMD.

Candidate	Party	Votes	%
Sol Matugas	Lakas–Kampi–CMD	111,225	50.29
Ace Barbers	Nacionalista Party	109,011	49.29
Ruperto Deguiño	Independent	910	0.41
Total		221,146	100.00
Valid votes		221,146	94.30
Invalid/blank votes		13,376	5.70
Total votes		234,522	100.00
Lakas–Kampi–CMD gain from Nacionalista Party			
Source: Commission on Elections

=== Vice governor ===
Arturo Carlos Egay Jr. of Lakas–Kampi–CMD was elected as vice governor.

Candidate	Party	Votes	%
Arturo Carlos Egay Jr.	Lakas–Kampi–CMD	100,237	51.98
Noel Catre	Nacionalista Party	89,738	46.54
Charlie Talledo	Independent	2,864	1.49
Total		192,839	100.00
Valid votes		192,839	82.23
Invalid/blank votes		41,683	17.77
Total votes		234,522	100.00
Source: Commission on Elections

=== Provincial board ===
The Surigao del Norte Provincial Board is composed of 13 board members, 10 of whom are elected.

Party	Votes	%	Seats
Lakas–Kampi–CMD	350,067	48.25	5
Nacionalista Party	319,053	43.98	4
Pwersa ng Masang Pilipino	23,972	3.30	0
Partido Padayon Surigao	20,973	2.89	1
Independent	11,426	1.57	0
Total	725,491	100.00	10
Total votes	234,522	–	
Source: Commission on Elections

==== 1st district ====
Candidate	Party	Votes	%
Mamerto Galanida	Lakas–Kampi–CMD	22,526	10.99
Simeon Castrence	Partido Padayon Surigao	20,973	10.23
Cesar Bagundol	Lakas–Kampi–CMD	18,932	9.23
Margarito Longos	Lakas–Kampi–CMD	18,900	9.22
Edgar Andanar	Nacionalista Party	17,574	8.57
Norman Gopico	Nacionalista Party	16,974	8.28
Leonila Gorgolon-Licuan	Lakas–Kampi–CMD	16,913	8.25
Marietta Teves	Nacionalista Party	15,750	7.68
Fernando Piao	Nacionalista Party	14,588	7.12
Rodolfo Navarro	Pwersa ng Masang Pilipino	12,180	5.94
Pedro Resurreccion	Nacionalista Party	11,592	5.65
Rolo Escuyos	Pwersa ng Masang Pilipino	8,174	3.99
Cesar Galanida	Independent	4,502	2.20
Nathaniel Corbeta	Pwersa ng Masang Pilipino	3,618	1.76
Stella Bacor	Independent	1,813	0.88
Total		205,009	100.00
Total votes		61,929	–
Source: Commission on Elections

==== 2nd district ====
Candidate	Party	Votes	%
Myrna Romarate	Lakas–Kampi–CMD	81,176	15.60
Fernando Larong	Lakas–Kampi–CMD	65,087	12.51
Leonilo Aldonza	Nacionalista Party	63,332	12.17
Regina Alaan	Nacionalista Party	55,891	10.74
Victor Borja	Nacionalista Party	55,556	10.67
Jessnar Mosende	Lakas–Kampi–CMD	51,799	9.95
Henry Gonzales	Lakas–Kampi–CMD	38,005	7.30
Manuel Kong	Lakas–Kampi–CMD	36,729	7.06
Constante Elumba	Nacionalista Party	34,576	6.64
Ronnie Mosende	Nacionalista Party	33,220	6.38
Romeo Petallo	Independent	5,111	0.98
Total		520,482	100.00
Total votes		172,593	–
Source: Commission on Elections

== Surigao del Sur ==
=== Governor ===
Term-limited incumbent governor Vicente Pimentel Jr. of Lakas–Kampi–CMD ran for mayor of Carrascal. Lakas–Kampi–CMD nominated his brother, provincial administrator Johnny Pimentel, who won the election.

Candidate	Party	Votes	%
Johnny Pimentel	Lakas–Kampi–CMD	156,168	70.39
Percito Lozada	Independent	58,341	26.29
Anecito Lozada	Independent	4,971	2.24
Artemio Maquiso	Independent	2,396	1.08
Total		221,876	100.00
Valid votes		221,876	84.71
Invalid/blank votes		40,041	15.29
Total votes		261,917	100.00
Lakas–Kampi–CMD gain from Nacionalista Party			
Source: Commission on Elections

=== Vice governor ===
Manuel Alameda Sr. of Lakas–Kampi–CMD was elected as vice governor.

Candidate	Party	Votes	%
Manuel Alameda Sr.	Lakas–Kampi–CMD	107,289	48.69
Glenn Plaza	Liberal Party	41,684	18.92
Lolito Cuartero Jr.	Nacionalista Party	25,084	11.38
Pascual Palma Jr.	Independent	16,212	7.36
Mario Lumanao	PDP–Laban	16,003	7.26
Remedios Alvizo	Nationalist People's Coalition	14,098	6.40
Total		220,370	100.00
Valid votes		220,370	84.14
Invalid/blank votes		41,547	15.86
Total votes		261,917	100.00
Source: Commission on Elections

=== Provincial board ===
The Surigao del Sur Provincial Board is composed of 14 board members, 10 of whom are elected.

Party	Votes	%	Seats
Lakas–Kampi–CMD	446,056	52.47	9
Nacionalista Party	107,999	12.70	0
Liberal Party	87,701	10.32	0
Nationalist People's Coalition	87,338	10.27	1
Pwersa ng Masang Pilipino	16,613	1.95	0
Bagumbayan–VNP	14,106	1.66	0
PDP–Laban	5,541	0.65	0
Independent	84,773	9.97	0
Total	850,127	100.00	10
Total votes	261,917	–	
Source: Commission on Elections

==== 1st district ====
Candidate	Party	Votes	%
Eleanor Momo	Lakas–Kampi–CMD	88,892	17.78
Leodegario Arreza	Lakas–Kampi–CMD	55,084	11.02
Mariano Atacador	Lakas–Kampi–CMD	54,207	10.84
Teresita Donasco	Lakas–Kampi–CMD	49,419	9.88
Antonio Azarcon	Lakas–Kampi–CMD	44,484	8.90
Ramon Tan	Liberal Party	32,373	6.47
Dennis Yu	Independent	22,300	4.46
Apolonio Lozada	Liberal Party	21,442	4.29
Carlos Densing	Pwersa ng Masang Pilipino	16,613	3.32
Herwin Villamor	Bagumbayan–VNP	14,106	2.82
Vicente Cirilo Iriberri	Liberal Party	14,072	2.81
Florante Pimentel	Nacionalista Party	13,581	2.72
Ayrocindemi Medrano	Liberal Party	12,755	2.55
Jerry Pacheco	Independent	11,999	2.40
Ronald Verano	Independent	10,334	2.07
Radigundo Rivas	Independent	8,705	1.74
Antonio Campos	Nacionalista Party	7,723	1.54
Rolando Cahilog	PDP–Laban	5,541	1.11
Jessie Pagaran	Independent	4,512	0.90
Romeo Varela	Nacionalista Party	4,129	0.83
Eugene Bandoy	Nacionalista Party	3,898	0.78
Victorious Elpa	Independent	3,889	0.78
Total		500,058	100.00
Total votes		154,139	–
Source: Commission on Elections

==== 2nd district ====
Candidate	Party	Votes	%
Mary Grace Lim-Soriano	Lakas–Kampi–CMD	39,091	11.17
Emmanuel Nazareno	Lakas–Kampi–CMD	39,019	11.15
Rafael Viduya	Lakas–Kampi–CMD	31,862	9.10
Tito Cañedo III	Nationalist People's Coalition	30,834	8.81
Napoleon Velez	Lakas–Kampi–CMD	28,254	8.07
Arturo Ronquillo	Nationalist People's Coalition	28,229	8.06
Marlon Advincula	Nacionalista Party	26,646	7.61
Anita Banalo	Nationalist People's Coalition	19,755	5.64
Apolinario Suan	Nacionalista Party	18,001	5.14
Gertrudes Cabatingan	Nacionalista Party	17,205	4.91
Magno Cuyno Jr.	Nacionalista Party	16,816	4.80
Narciso Coralde	Lakas–Kampi–CMD	15,744	4.50
Nerio Peñanueva	Nationalist People's Coalition	8,520	2.43
Gregorio Pagaduan Jr.	Independent	8,481	2.42
Manuel Neri Sr.	Liberal Party	7,059	2.02
Alfredo Asis	Independent	5,426	1.55
Rosita Eboña	Independent	4,103	1.17
Leonardo Saito	Independent	2,936	0.84
Gervacio Morgado Jr.	Independent	2,088	0.60
Total		350,069	100.00
Total votes		107,778	–
Source: Commission on Elections
