= List of San Sebastian College – Recoletos people =

People associated with San Sebastian College – Recoletos de Manila.

== Media ==
- Alice Dixson – actress
- BB Gandanghari – actor/actress
- Kyla (Melanie Calumpad) – singer (high school)
- Jay Manalo – actor
- Fernando Poe Jr. – actor (1st year-2nd year high school)
- Mat Ranillo III – actor (high school)
- Gladys Reyes – actress
- McCoy de Leon – cast member of the hit Philippine daytime series Be Careful With My Heart; #Hashtag male dancer on the noontime variety show It's Showtime. (high school)

== Sports ==
- Calvin Abueva – PBA Alaska Aces player; led NCAA season 88 in points, rebounds, and assist in his final year, NCAA season 87 MVP, NCAA season 85 Men's Basketball Champion
- Rommel Adducul – 5-time NCAA champion, 3-time NCAA MVP
- Ian Sangalang – PBA player, NCAA season 85 Men's Basketball Champion
- Ronald Pascual – PBA player, NCAA season 85 Men's Basketball Champion
- John Raymundo – PBA player, NCAA season 85 Men's Basketball Champion
- Jimbo Aquino – PBA player, NCAA season 85 Men's Basketball Champion
- Gilbert Bulawan – PBA player, NCAA season 85 Men's Basketball Champion
- Marco Alcaraz – actor, model, basketball player
- Paul Alvarez – NCAA, PBA player and actor (college)
- Jason Ballesteros – basketball player, former Smart Gilas Pilipinas player
- Christian Coronel – former PBA player, ABL team Philippine Patriots
- Paul Lee – (high school) PBA player, PBA Rookie of the year, NCAA juniors champion
- Leo Najorda – PBA player
- Fernando Navarro – basketball player and coach
- John Raymundo – PBA player
- Topex Robinson – basketball player, former PBA player, Head Coach of San Sebastian Stags
- Rodney Santos – former PBA player
- Johnedel Cardel – NCAA, and former PBA player
- Homer Se – former PBA player
- JC Tiuseco – actor, model, basketball player; first Pinoy Sole Survivor
- Zanjoe Marudo – actor, model, basketball player;

== Politics ==
- Sara Duterte – politician, 15th Vice President of the Philippines, 38th Secretary of Education, Former Mayor of Davao City (LLB)
- Roilo Golez – politician
- Mayor Edward Hagedorn – politician
- Luis Chavit Singson – politician (high school)
- Mans Carpio – Second Gentleman of the Philippines (LLB)
- Antonino Calixto- Member of the Philippine House of Representatives from Pasay, Former Mayor of Pasay City
- Joel Chua - Lawyer; Manila 3rd district representative (2022-present) and City Councilor of 3rd district of Manila (2007-2016 ,2019-2022) (LLB)
- Lawrence Fortun - Lawyer; Mayor of Butuan (2025-present), Agusan del Norte 1st district representative (2013-2022), Vice-Mayor of Butuan (2010-2013, 2022-2025), and City Councilor of Butuan (2007-2010) (LLB)
