= Erlpe John Amante =

Filipino politician

The Honorable Erlpe John Amante
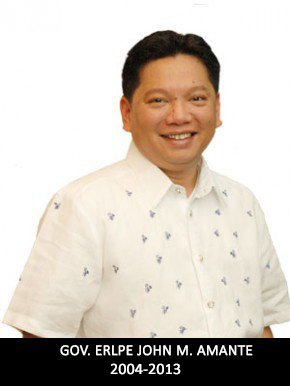

4th Governor of Agusan del Norte
- In office June 30, 2004 – June 30, 2013
- Vice Governor: Dale Corvera (2004–2007); Enrico Corvera (2007–2013)
- Preceded by: Angelica Amante
- Succeeded by: Angelica Amante

Member of the Philippine House of Representatives from Agusan del Norte's 2nd congressional district
- In office June 30, 2013 – June 30, 2019
- Preceded by: Angelica Amante
- Succeeded by: Angelica Amante

Personal details
- Party: Nacionalista (2015–present)
- Other political affiliations: Independent (2010–2015); Lakas–CMD (2008–2010); KAMPI (until 2008)
- Education: University of the Philippines Diliman (BA)

Erlpe John "Ping" Malbas Amante is the former Representative of Agusan del Norte's 2nd congressional district. He started his term in July 2013, until he was defeated by his sister Ma. Angelica Amante-Matba on in 2019.

Amante took his elementary and secondary education at Trinity University of Asia, formerly called Trinity College of Quezon City, from 1973 to 1982. He took up AB Political Science at the University of the Philippines Diliman.

He entered politics in his home province, Agusan del Norte, just like his father, the late Cong. Edelmiro Amante, was elected as Provincial Governor in 2004. He was re-elected for three consecutive terms until 2013.

As governor, he focused on improving the quality of education in the province and making it more accessible to the less privileged constituents, especially members of the indigenous groups. He distributed textbooks to all public elementary and secondary schools in the province and opened a scholarship program for indigent college students.

He was also given the privilege to attend international seminars sponsored by the Government of Sweden and the US State Department in 2006 and 2009, respectively.

Taking public service to a higher level, he ran for Congress and was elected last year, representing the 2nd District of Agusan del Norte. He is a member of fifteen (15) House committees, including Basic Education and Culture, and serves as Vice Chairperson for the committees on Agrarian Reform, Information and Communications Technology, Natural Resources, and Small Business & Entrepreneurship Development. He is one of the most prolific neophyte lawmakers in the 16th Congress, having filed 31 house bills and resolutions and co-authored 30.

Just last September 2014, Congressman Amante was awarded the 2014 Outstanding Filipino Achiever in Public Service by the Golden Globe Awards for Business Excellence in recognition of his efforts to progressively develop Agusan del Norte.
