= Butuan City Council =

The Butuan City Council, more commonly known as the Sangguniang Panlungsod ng Butuan or SP Butuan, is the local legislative body of Butuan City in the Philippines. It is tasked with creating and enacting ordinances, resolutions, and policies essential for the city's effective governance.

The Butuan City Council consists of 13 members - One Vice Mayor, 10 Elected Councilors, One ABC-Liga Federation President, and One Sangguniang Kabataan Federation President.

== The Sanggunian Hong Katawhan (16th SP Butuan) ==
The 16th Sangguniang Panlungsod ng Butuan, dubbed as the Sanggunian Hong Katawhan (translated as The City Council of the People), aims to establish a legislative body that encourages direct civic engagement and participatory governance, making it easy for Butuanons to voice their concerns, provide input on legislation, and engage directly with their elected representatives. currently composed of the following members:

=== Vice Mayor/Presiding Officer (1) ===
- Atty. Lawrence Lemuel H. Fortun (1st Term) - Lawyer, Former Representative of the 1st District of Agusan del Norte, Former City Vice Mayor (2010-2013)

=== Elected City Councilors (10) ===
1. Joseph Omar O. Andaya (3rd Term) - Businessman
2. Cromwell P. Nortega (3rd Term) - Political Science Major, Former SK Federation President (1996)
3. Reynante B. Desiata (1st Term) - Former City Administrator
4. Atty. John Gil S. Unay, Sr. (3rd Term) - Lawyer
5. Cherry May G. Busa (3rd Term) - Registered Nurse
6. Atty. Ehrnest John C. Sanchez (3rd Term) - Lawyer
7. Victor Vicente G. Plaza (1st Term) - Businessman
8. Dr. Eduardo S. Gonzalez (1st Term) - Doctor of Medicine
9. Arturo P. Gado (1st Term) - Former Barangay Chairperson
10. Vacant - Vacated by Engr. Rosario

=== Ex-Officio Members (2) ===
1. Gemma P. Tabada - Liga ng mga Barangay President
2. Joseph Manuel Morcilla - Sangguniang Kabataan (SK) Federation President

=== Former Members ===
1. Engr. Vincent Rizal C. Rosario (3rd Term) - Unfinished Term (Elected as Barangay Chairperson)
2. Cynth Zephanee N. Nietes - Former SK Federation President, Expired Term

=== Standing Committees ===
Committee	Chairperson	Vice Chairperson	Members
Agriculture, Fisheries and Agro-Forestry	Arturo P. Gado	Joseph Omar O. Andaya	Gemma P. Tabada Joseph Manuel Morcilla Victor Vicente G. Plaza
Appropriations and Accounts	Atty. Lawrence Lemuel H. Fortun	Joseph Omar O. Andaya, Reynante B. Desiata	Gemma P. Tabada
Barangay Affairs	Gemma P. Tabada		Joseph Manuel Morcilla
Civil Service and Reorganization	Atty. Ehrnest John C. Sanchez	Cherry May G. Busa	Dr. Eduardo S. Gonzalez Reynante B. Desiata Victor Vicente G. Plaza
Disaster Risk Reduction and Climate Change Adaptation	Engr. Vincent Rizal C. Rosario	Victor Vicente G. Plaza	Gemma P. Tabada Joseph Manuel Morcilla Reynante B. Desiata
Education, Culture, Arts, and Heritage	Joseph Omar O. Andaya	Cherry May G. Busa	Cromwell P. Nortega, Gemma P. Tabada, Joseph Manuel Morcilla
Environment and Natural Resources	Victor Vicente G. Plaza	Reynante B. Desiata	Engr. Vincent Rizal C. Rosario, Gemma P. Tabada, Joseph Manuel Morcilla
External and International Relations	Atty. Lawrence Lemuel H. Fortun	Reynante B. Desiata	Joseph Omar O. Andaya, Gemma P. Tabada
Family, Women and Children's Welfare	Cherry May G. Busa	Gemma P. Tabada	Dr. Eduardo S. Gonzalez, Joseph Manuel Morcilla
Franchises and Licenses	Atty. John Gil S. Unay, Sr.	Cromwell P. Nortega	Gemma P. Tabada, Joseph Manuel Morcilla
Good Government, Ethics, Human Rights, Laws, Rules, and Styles	Cromwell P. Nortega	Atty. John Gil S. Unay, Sr.	Gemma P. Tabada, Joseph Manuel Morcilla
Health and Sanitation	Dr. Eduardo S. Gonzalez	Cherry May G. Busa	Gemma P. Tabada, Joseph Manuel Morcilla
Housing and Human Resettlement	Reynante B. Desiata	Atty. Ehrnest John C. Sanchez	Gemma P. Tabada
Labor, Employment and Human Resources	Arturo P. Gado	Atty. Ehrnest John C. Sanchez	Dr. Eduardo S. Gonzalez, Gemma P. Tabada, Joseph Manuel Morcilla
People Participation and Cooperatives	Cromwell P. Nortega	Atty. John Gil S. Unay, Sr.	Gemma P. Tabada, Joseph Manuel Morcilla
Public Order and Safety	Atty. Ehrnest John C. Sanchez	Engr. Vincent Rizal C. Rosario	Gemma P. Tabada, Joseph Manuel Morcilla
Science and Technology	Cherry May G. Busa	Joseph Omar O. Andaya	Gemma P. Tabada, Joseph Manuel Morcilla
Social Welfare	Victor Vicente G. Plaza	Gemma P. Tabada	
Tourism	Dr. Eduardo S. Gonzalez	Cromwell P. Nortega	Gemma P. Tabada, Joseph Manuel Morcilla
Trade, Industry, and Economic Development	Joseph Omar O. Andaya	Cherry May G. Busa	Gemma P. Tabada, Joseph Manuel Morcilla
Transportation and Traffic Management	Engr. Vincent Rizal C. Rosario	Atty. Ehrnest John C. Sanchez	Gemma P. Tabada, Reynante B. Desiata
Urban Planning and Infrastructure	Reynante B. Desiata	Engr. Vincent Rizal C. Rosario	Gemma P. Tabada

== Past and Present Legislative Members ==
Name	Sangguniang Panlungsod																																												
Name	1st		2nd		3rd		4th		5th				6th			7th			8th			9th			10th			11th			12th			13th			14th			15th			16th		
Name	1950s		1960s		1970s		1980s			1990s										2000s										2010s										2020s					
Name	1950-54	55-59	1960-64	65-69	1970-74	75-79	1980-87	88	89	90	91	92	93	94	95	96	97	98	99	00	01	02	03	04	05	06	07	08	09	10	11	12	13	14	15	16	17	18	19	20	21	22	23	24	25
AMANTE, Samuel Allan M.																																		•											
AMOC, Raul O.																									•			•			•														
AMORA, Nestor D.																															ABC														
ANDAYA, Joseph Omar O.																																					•			•			•		
AQUINO, Jose II S.																																					VM			VM					
BALANON, Emmanuel R.													VM																																
BANAAG, Leovigildo B.									•				•			VM																													
BERNABE, Audie G.																												•			•														
BUÑOL, Lope A.																												•																	
BURDEOS, Rema E.																																		•			•			•					
BUSA, Cherry May G.																																					•			•			•		
CALO, Angelo S.									•				•			•			VM			VM			VM						•			VM											
CALO, Salvador V.																												•																	
CARAMPATANA, Glenn																																					•			•					
CARAMPATANA, Ramon P.																												•			•			•											
CARAMPATANA, Rauzil A.																															SK														
CEMBRANO, Jaime Jr. M.													•			•						•			•						•			•											
CULIMA, Ryan Anthony B.													SK						•			•			•						•			•											
DANO, Erwin L.																												•			•			•											
DAYADAY, Rodrigo L.																												•																	
DESIATA, Reynante B.																																											•		
FORTUN, Lawrence Lemuel H.																												•			VM												VM		
GADO, Arturo P.																																											•		
GONZALEZ, Eduardo S.																																											•		
MORCILLA, Joseph Manuel																																												SK	
NALCOT, Ferdinand E.																																		•			•			•					
NERI, Virgilio Jr. G.																															•			•											
NIETES, Cynth Zephanee N.																																						SK							
NORTEGA, Cromwell P.																																					•			•			•		
PASCUAL, Sergio C.																																		•											
PLAZA, Derrick A.																																		•			•			•					
PLAZA, Randolph B.																							AC		•			•			•														
Plaza, Victor Vicente G.																																											•		
ROSARIO, Vincent R.																																					•			•			•		
SALISE, Josephine M.																												•			•														
SANCHEZ, Dino Claudio M.																												VM																	
SANCHEZ, Ehrnest John C.																																					•			•			•		
TABADA, Gemma P.																																						ABC							
UNAY, John Gil Sr. S.																																					•			•			•		

LEGEND:
Elected Vice Mayor	VM
Appointed Vice Mayor	AVM
Elected City Councilor	•
Appointed Councilor	AC
ABC Liga ng mga Barangay President	ABC
Sangguniang Kabataan Federation President	SK

== See also ==
- Legislative districts of Agusan del Norte
