= Angelica Amante =

Filipino politician

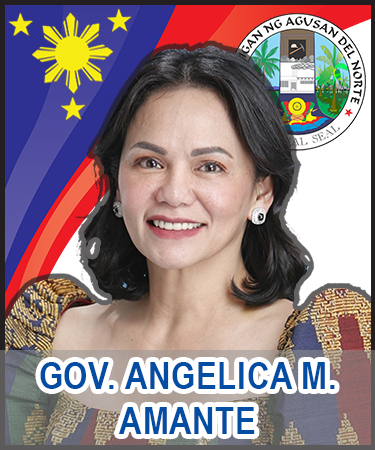

3rd, 5th, & 7th Governor of Agusan del Norte
- Incumbent
- Assumed office June 30, 2022
- Vice Governor: Enrico Corvera
- Preceded by: Dale Corvera
- In office June 30, 2013 – June 30, 2019
- Vice Governor: Ramon Bungabong
- Preceded by: Erlpe John Amante
- Succeeded by: Dale Corvera
- In office June 30, 1995 – June 30, 2004
- Vice Governor: Roberto Tejano
- Preceded by: Eduardo Rama
- Succeeded by: Erlpe John Amante

Member of the Philippine House of Representatives from Agusan del Norte's 2nd district
- In office June 30, 2019 – June 30, 2022
- Preceded by: Erlpe John Amante
- Succeeded by: Dale Corvera
- In office June 30, 2010 – June 30, 2013
- Preceded by: Edelmiro Amante
- Succeeded by: Erlpe John Amante
- In office June 30, 2004 – June 30, 2007
- Preceded by: Edelmiro Amante
- Succeeded by: Edelmiro Amante

Personal details
- Born: Maria Angelica Rosedell Malbas Amante; April 16, 1970 (age 56) Cabadbaran, Agusan del Norte, Philippines
- Party: PDP (since 2016)
- Other political affiliations: Liberal (2010–2016); Lakas (until 2010)
- Spouse: Rashidin H. Matba
- Education: Father Saturnino Urios University (MPA); Trinity University of Asia (BS)
- Profession: Politician; nurse

Maria Angelica Rosedell Malbas Amante Matba (born April 16, 1970) is a Filipino politician who has served as the governor of Agusan del Norte since 2022, a position she previously held from 1995 to 2004 and from 2013 to 2019. She has also served as the representative for Agusan del Norte's 2nd district for three intermittent terms between her three governorships.

== Early life and education ==
Amante-Matba was born and raised in Cabadbaran, Agusan del Norte. She is the daughter of former Executive Secretary and Congressman Edelmiro Amante and former Cabadbaran Mayor Rosario Malbas-Amante. Her brother Erlpe John Amante is also a politician.

She took up nursing at St. Luke's College of Nursing, Trinity University of Asia in 1991. She passed the licensure examination for nursing in 1991 and the California State Board Exam in Nursing in 1994. She also holds a master's degree in public administration from Father Saturnino Urios University in Butuan.

== Political career ==
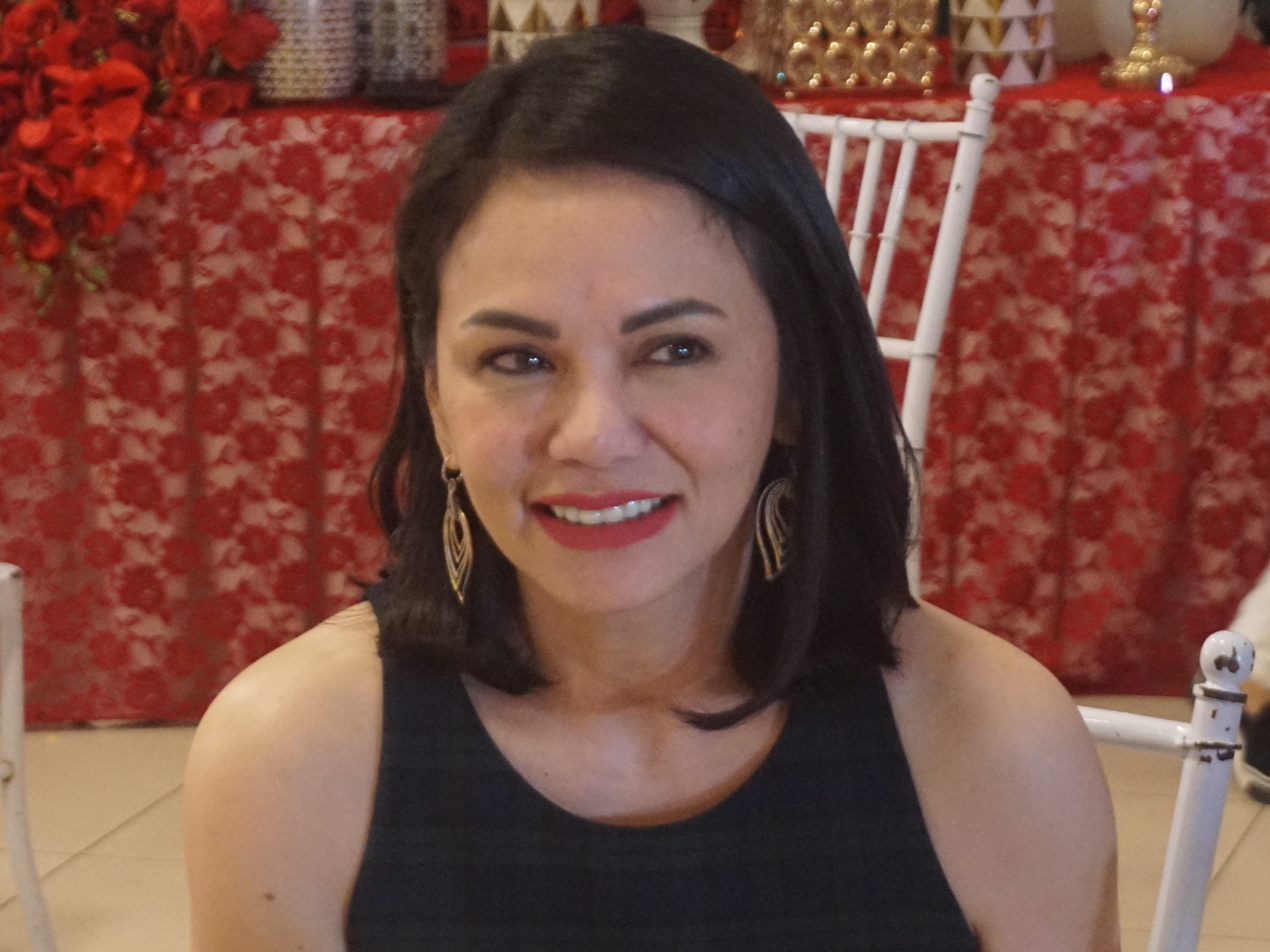
Amante-Matba in 2019

Amante-Matba started her political career as the governor of Agusan del Norte serving three consecutive terms from 1995 to 2004. At the time, she was the youngest provincial governor assuming office at only 25 years old. From 1995 to 1998, she was the chairperson of the Regional Development Council of Caraga. From 1998 to 2001, she was elected as the secretary of the Confederation of Provincial Governors, City Mayors and Municipal Mayors League Presidents of Mindanao of the Mindanao Economic Development Council (MEDCO).

Due to constitutional provisions that limit gubernatorial terms of office to only three consecutive terms, in the 2004 elections, Amante-Matba ran for congress and won a seat in the House of Representatives representing Agusan del Norte's 2nd congressional district. She served for one term before running as mayor of Butuan in 2007 which she lost to incumbent Democrito Plaza.

In 2010, she ran for congress again while her brother ran for governor. They both won their respective races. In 2013 and 2016, Amante-Matba and her brother swapped their positions wherein the latter served as congressman while Amante-Matba served governor. They won and Amante-Matba served as governor until 2019. She ran and won again the congressional seat in 2019 and served for one term before returning as governor in 2022.

== 2016 presidential elections ==
Amante is a close ally of President Rodrigo Duterte. She was once quoted by President Duterte as the girl who he has love at first sight. He admitted publicly that a governor from Mindanao whom he once fell in love with was one of his supporters during the campaign.

== Personal life ==
Amante is married to Tawi-Tawi congressman Rashidin H. Matba.

On March 27, 2015, she survived an ambush attempt at Nasipit, Agusan del Norte perpetrated by members of the New People's Army.

== Related Links ==
- "Member Information: Ma. Angelica M. Amante-Matba". House of Representatives of the Philippines.
