= Mayor of Butuan =

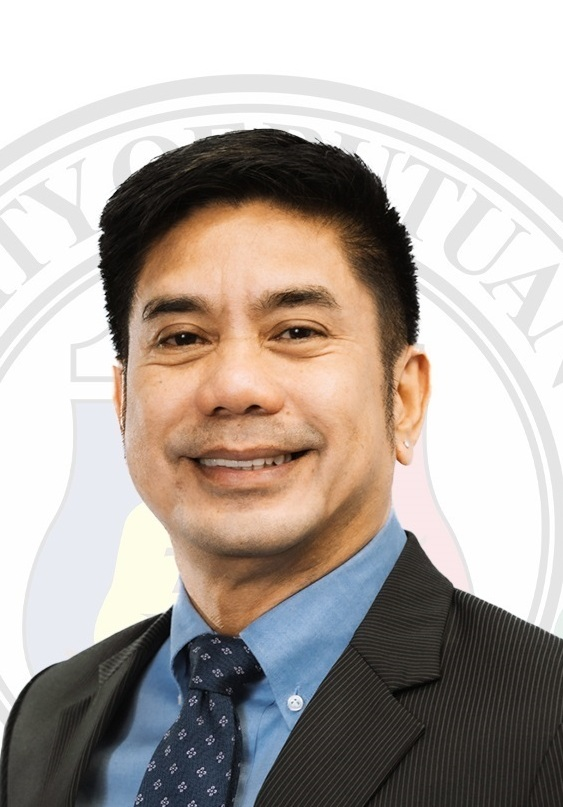
- Incumbent; Lawrence Fortun since June 30, 2025
- Style: The Honorable
- Residence: Butuan City Hall
- Appointer: Elected via popular vote
- Term length: 3 years
- Inaugural holder: Romulo Rosales
- Formation: 1948

The mayor of Butuan (Filipino: Punong Lungsod ng Butuan) is the chief executive of the city government of Butuan in Mindanao, Philippines. The mayor leads the city's departments in executing ordinances and delivering public services. The mayorship is a three-year term and each mayor is restricted to three consecutive terms, totaling nine years, although a mayor can be elected again after an interruption of one term.

== Butuan Mayors and Vice Mayors ==
MAYOR	PERIOD	VICE MAYOR
Romulo A. Rosales	1948–1950	UNKNOWN
Rodolfo D. Calo	1950–1953	UNKNOWN
Zacarias Pizarro	1953–1959	UNKNOWN
Salvador L. Calo	1959–1968	UNKNOWN
Guillermo R. Sanchez	1968–1969	UNKNOWN
Sylvestre M. Osin	1969–1971	UNKNOWN
Figurado O. Plaza	1971–1986	UNKNOWN
Marcos V. Calo	1986–1986	UNKNOWN
Guillermo R. Sanchez	1986–1987	UNKNOWN
Guillermo R. Sanchez	1987–1992	Carlito T. Tan
Democrito D. Plaza II	1992–1995	Emmanuel R. Balanon
Democrito D. Plaza II	1995–1998	Leovigildo B. Banaag
Democrito D. Plaza II	1998–2001	Angelo S. Calo
Leonides Theresa B. Plaza	2001–2004	Angelo S. Calo
Democrito D. Plaza II	2004–2007	Angelo S. Calo
Democrito D. Plaza II	2007–2010	Dino Claudio M. Sanchez
Ferdinand M. Amante, Jr.	2010–2013	Lawrence Lemuel H. Fortun
Ferdinand M. Amante, Jr.	2013–2016	Angelo S. Calo
Ronnie Vicente Lagnada	2016–2019	Jose S. Aquino II
Ronnie Vicente Lagnada	2019–2022	Jose S. Aquino II
Ronnie Vicente Lagnada	2022–2025	Lawrence Lemuel H. Fortun
Lawrence Lemuel H. Fortun	2025–present	Rey Desiata

== See also ==
- Legislative districts of Agusan del Norte
- Councilors of Butuan
