= Ronnie Vicente Lagnada =

Philippine politician

The Honorable Ronnie Vicente Lagnada
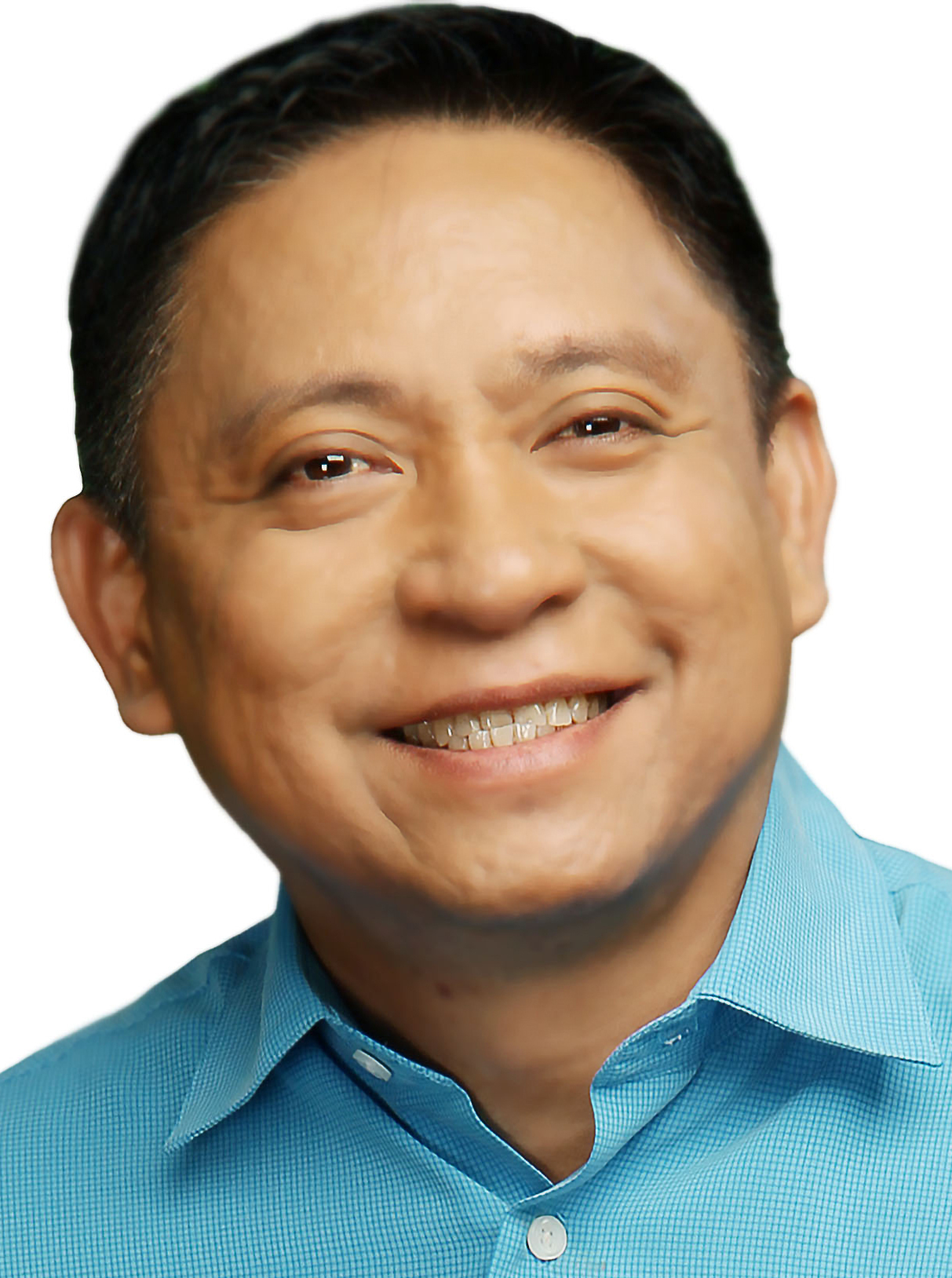

Mayor of Butuan
- In office June 30, 2016 – June 30, 2025
- Vice Mayor: Jose Aquino II (2016–2022); Lawrence Fortun (2022–2025)
- Preceded by: Ferdinand M. Amante, Jr.
- Succeeded by: Lawrence Fortun

Personal details
- Born: November 27, 1962 (age 63) Butuan, Agusan, Philippines
- Party: Nacionalista (2018-present)
- Other political affiliations: NUP (2015-2018)
- Spouse: Titing C. Lagnada
- Children: 2 sons (twins)
- Education: Father Saturnino Urios University (Highschool); Xavier University (Ateneo De Cagayan) (BS)
- Profession: Civil engineer, politician

Ronnie Vicente Conde Lagnada (born November 27, 1962), known as Ronnievic, simplified as RCL, is a Filipino civil engineer and politician who previously served as 14th Mayor of Butuan. He is a member of the National Unity Party, and also the owner of Equi-Parco Construction Company.

== Career ==
=== Political career ===
Lagnada topped the FSUU Poll survey last April 2016, and became the Mayor of Butuan in 2016 after he defeated the previous mayor in a local election.
