= Nilo Demerey Jr. =

Filipino politician

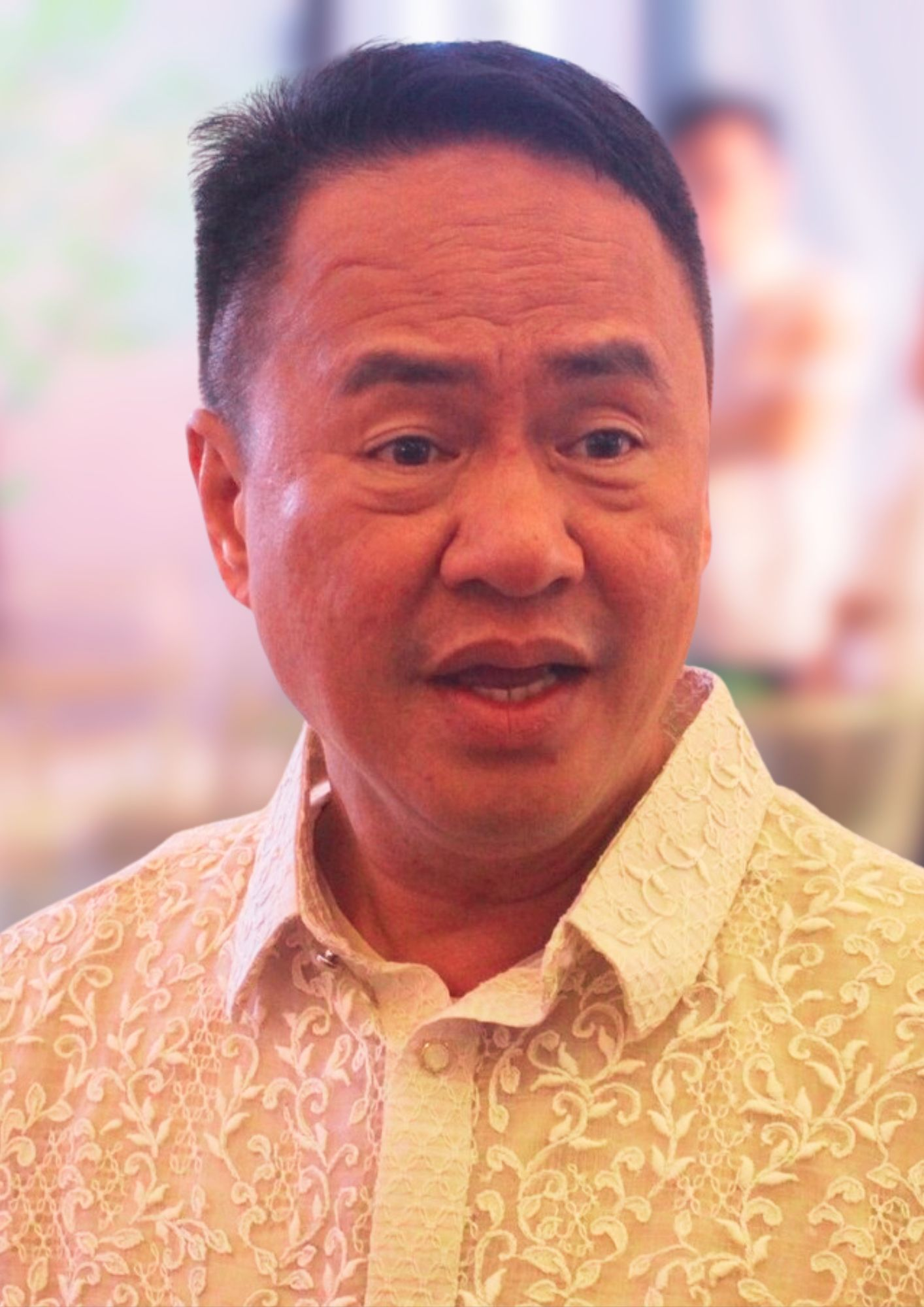
- Demerey in 2023

4th Governor of Dinagat Islands
- Incumbent
- Assumed office June 30, 2022
- Vice Governor: Benglen Ecleo (2022–2025); Jade Ecleo (2025–present)
- Preceded by: Kaka Bag-ao

Vice Governor of Dinagat Islands
- In office June 30, 2019 – June 30, 2022
- Governor: Kaka Bag-ao
- Preceded by: Benglen Ecleo
- Succeeded by: Benglen Ecleo

Member of the Dinagat Islands Provincial Board from the 2nd District
- In office June 30, 2016 – June 30, 2019

Personal details
- Born: October 23, 1968 (age 57) Davao City, Davao del Sur, Philippines
- Party: PFP (2024–present)
- Other political affiliations: Lakas (2021–2024); PDP–Laban (2018–2021); UNA (2015–2018)
- Spouse: Marichu Miranda
- Education: Ateneo de Davao University (BA)
- Website: https://dinagatislands.com.ph/governor/

Nilo Pepito Demerey Jr. (born October 23, 1968) is the current governor of the province of Dinagat Islands in the island of Mindanao, Philippines.

He is the fourth chief executive of the province since its creation on 2 December 2006, and the first male to be elected to the position. He served as vice governor and a senior member of the Provincial Board from 2019 to 2022, before winning the gubernatorial seat in the 2022 local and national elections.

== Electoral history ==
Electoral history of Nilo Demerey Jr.
Year	Office	Party	Votes received				Result
Year	Office	Party	Total	%	P.	Swing	Result
2016	Board Member (Dinagat Islands–1st)	UNA	12,447	—N/a	2nd	—N/a	Won
2019	Vice Governor of Dinagat Islands	PDP-Laban	27,833	—N/a	1st	—N/a	Won
2022	Governor of Dinagat Islands	Lakas	33,993	57.09%	1st	—N/a	Won
2025	Governor of Dinagat Islands	PFP	41,527	50.85%	1st	-6.24	Won
