= Dinagat Islands Provincial Board =

Legislative body of the province of Dinagat Islands, Philippines

Dinagat Islands Provincial Board Sangguniang Panlalawigan ng Kapuluang Dinagat

Type
- Type: Unicameral
- Term limits: 3 terms (9 years)

Leadership
- Presiding Officer: Jade Ecleo, PFP since June 30, 2025

Structure
- Seats: 13 board members 1 ex officio presiding officer
- Political groups: Lakas-CMD (5) PFP (3) Akbayan (1) Independent (1) Nonpartisan (2) TBD (1)
- Length of term: 3 years
- Authority: Local Government Code of the Philippines

Elections
- Voting system: Multiple non-transferable vote (regular members); Indirect election (ex officio members)
- Last election: May 12, 2025
- Next election: May 15, 2028

Meeting place
- Dinagat Islands Provincial Capitol, San Jose

The Dinagat Islands Provincial Board is the Sangguniang Panlalawigan (provincial legislature) of the Philippine province of Dinagat Islands.

The members are elected via plurality-at-large voting: the province is divided into two districts, each having four seats. A voter votes up to four names, with the top four candidates per district being elected. The vice governor is the ex officio presiding officer, and only votes to break ties. The vice governor is elected via the plurality voting system province-wide.

The districts used in appropriation of members is not coextensive with the legislative district of Dinagat Islands; unlike congressional representation which is at-large, Dinagat Islands is divided into two districts for representation in the Sangguniang Panlalawigan.

Aside from the regular members, the board also includes the provincial federation presidents of the Liga ng mga Barangay (ABC, from its old name "Association of Barangay Captains"), the Sangguniang Kabataan (SK, youth councils) and the Philippine Councilors League (PCL).

== Apportionment ==
Elections	Seats per district		Ex officio seats	Total seats
Elections	1st	2nd	Ex officio seats	Total seats
2010–2025	4	4	3	11
2025–present	6	4	3	13

== List of members ==
=== Current members ===
These are the members after the 2025 local elections and 2023 barangay and SK elections:

- Vice Governor: Jade Ecleo (PFP)

Seat	Board member	Party	Start of term	End of term
1st district	Ali P. Adlawan	Lakas	June 30, 2019	June 30, 2028
1st district	Carlos P. Bua	PFP	June 30, 2019	June 30, 2028
1st district	Nilo Marco M. Demerey	PFP	June 30, 2025	June 30, 2028
1st district	Anna Leyn C. Diale	Akbayan	June 30, 2019	June 30, 2028
1st district	Zacarias N. Vales	Lakas	June 30, 2025	June 30, 2028
1st district	Ronald O. Luid Sr.	Lakas	June 30, 2025	June 30, 2028
2nd district	Errol Conrad B. Dela Cruz	Independent	June 30, 2019	June 30, 2028
2nd district	Jaypee T. Espares	Lakas	June 30, 2025	June 30, 2028
2nd district	Leolexes B. Durano	PFP	June 30, 2025	June 30, 2028
2nd district	Alexis B. Tugay	Lakas	June 30, 2025	June 30, 2028
ABC	Elmie Olaco	Nonpartisan	July 30, 2018	January 1, 2023
PCL	TBD			June 30, 2028
SK	Renford Ho	Nonpartisan	June 8, 2018	January 1, 2023

=== Vice Governor ===
Election year	Name	Party	Ref.
2016	Benglen B. Ecleo	UNA	
2019	Nilo Demerey Jr.	PDP–Laban	
2022	Benglen B. Ecleo	Lakas	
2025	Jade Ecleo	PFP	

=== 1st District ===
- Population (2024):

Election year	Member (party)	Member (party)	Member (party)	Ref.
2016	Nilo Demerey Jr. (UNA)	Antonio C. Ensoy (UNA)	—	
2016	Romeo Constantinus D. Vargas (Liberal)	Wenefredo R. Olofernes (Independent)	—	
2019	Carlos P. Bua (PDP–Laban)	Ali P. Adlawan (PDP–Laban)	—	
2019	Anna Lyn C. Dialde (Liberal)	Wenefredo R. Olofernes (Independent)	—	
2022	Carlos P. Bua (Lakas)	Ali P. Adlawan (Lakas)	—	
2022	Jocelyn Bucio-Relator (Lakas)	Anna Lyn C. Dialde (Liberal)	—	
2025	Carlos P. Bua (PFP)	Ali P. Adlawan (Lakas)	Nilo Marco M. Demerey (PFP)	
2025	Anna Lyn C. Dialde (Akbayan)	Zacarias N. Vales (Lakas)	Ronald O. Luid Sr. (Lakas)	

=== 2nd District ===
- Population (2024):

Election year	Member (party)	Member (party)	Member (party)	Member (party)	Ref.
2016	Reggivi Amor E. Alcaria (UNA)	Joslyn I. Ecleo (UNA)	Jess Paul D. Ecleo (UNA)	Noli B. Abis (Liberal)	
2019	Reggivi Amor E. Alcaria (PDP–Laban)	Errol Conrad B. dela Cruz (Independent)	Gwendolyn Ecleo (PDP–Laban)	Noli B. Abis (Akbayan)	
2022	Reggivi Amor E. Alcaria (Lakas)	Errol Conrad B. dela Cruz (Lakas)	Gwendolyn Ecleo (Lakas)	Carlos G. Eludo (until 2024) (Liberal)	
2025	Jaypee T. Espares (Lakas)	Errol Conrad B. dela Cruz (Independent)	Alexis B. Tugay (Lakas)	Leolexes B. Durano (PFP)	
