= Surigao del Sur Provincial Board =

Legislative body of the province of Surigao del Sur, Philippines

Surigao del Sur Provincial Board Sangguniang Panlalawigan ng Surigao del Sur

Type
- Type: Unicameral
- Term limits: 3 terms (9 years)

Leadership
- Presiding Officer: Manuel O. Alameda, PFP since June 30, 2022

Structure
- Seats: 14 board members 1 ex officio presiding officer
- Political groups: PFP (8) Hugpong Surigao del Sur (1) Nacionalista (1) TBD (1) Nonpartisan (2)
- Length of term: 3 years
- Authority: Local Government Code of the Philippines

Elections
- Voting system: Multiple non-transferable vote (regular members); Indirect election (ex officio members); Acclamation (sectoral member)
- Last election: May 12, 2025
- Next election: May 15, 2028

Meeting place
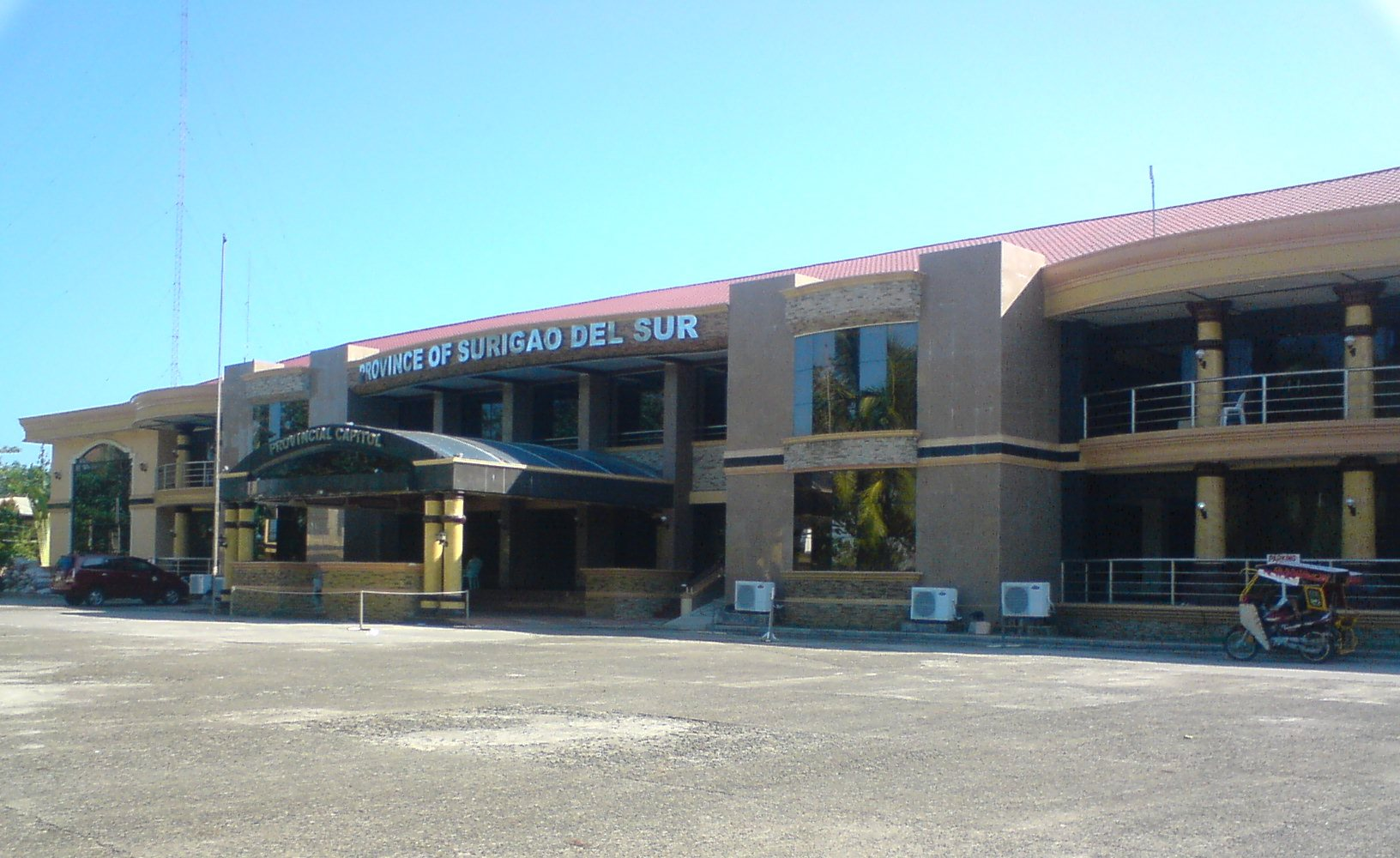
- Surigao del Sur Provincial Capitol, Tandag

The Surigao del Sur Provincial Board is the Sangguniang Panlalawigan (provincial legislature) of the Philippine province of Surigao del Sur.

The members are elected via plurality-at-large voting: the province is divided into two districts, each having five seats. A voter votes up to five names, with the top five candidates per district being elected. The vice governor is the ex officio presiding officer, and only votes to break ties. The vice governor is elected via the plurality voting system province-wide.

The districts used in appropriation of members is coextensive with the legislative districts of Surigao del Sur.

Aside from the regular members, the board also includes the provincial federation presidents of the Liga ng mga Barangay (ABC, from its old name "Association of Barangay Captains"), the Sangguniang Kabataan (SK, youth councils) and the Philippine Councilors League (PCL). Surigao del Sur's provincial board also has a reserved seat for its indigenous people (IPMR).

== Apportionment ==
Elections	Seats per district		Ex officio seats	Reserved seats	Total seats
Elections	1st	2nd	Ex officio seats	Reserved seats	Total seats
2010–present	5	5	3	1	14

== List of members ==
=== Current members ===
These are the members after the 2025 local elections and 2023 barangay and SK elections

- Vice Governor: Manuel O. Alameda (PFP)

Seat	Board member	Party	Start of term	End of term
1st district	Ruel D. Momo	PFP	June 30, 2019	June 30, 2028
1st district	Henrich M. Pimentel	Hugpong Surigao del Sur	June 30, 2025	June 30, 2028
1st district	Jose Dumagan Jr.	PFP	June 30, 2022	June 30, 2028
1st district	Antonio C. Azarcon	PFP	June 30, 2022	June 30, 2028
1st district	Valerio T. Montesclaros Jr.	PFP	June 30, 2019	June 30, 2028
2nd district	Joey S. Pama	PFP	June 30, 2025	June 30, 2028
2nd district	Gines Ricky J. Sayawan	PFP	June 30, 2022	June 30, 2028
2nd district	Margarita G. Garay	Nacionalista	June 30, 2019	June 30, 2028
2nd district	Anthony Joseph P. Cañedo	PFP	June 30, 2019	June 30, 2028
2nd district	Raul K. Salazar	PFP	June 30, 2022	June 30, 2028
ABC	Melanie Joy Momo-Guno	Nonpartisan	July 30, 2022	January 1, 2025
PCL				June 30, 2028
SK	Charles Arreza	Nonpartisan	June 8, 2018	January 1, 2023

=== Vice governor ===
Election year	Name	Party	Ref.
2016	Manuel O. Alameda, Sr.	Liberal	
2019	Librado C. Navarro	PDP–Laban	
2022	Manuel O. Alameda, Sr.	Hugpong Surigao del Sur	
2025	Manuel O. Alameda, Sr.	PFP	

=== 1st district ===
- Population (2024):

Election year	Member (party)	Member (party)	Member (party)	Member (party)	Member (party)	Ref.
2016	Eleanor D. Momo (Liberal)	Glenn P. Plaza (Liberal)	Mariano R. Atacador, Sr. (Liberal)	Teresita P. Donasco (Liberal)	Henrich M. Pimentel (Liberal)	
2019	Ruel D. Momo (PDP–Laban)	Glenn P. Plaza (PDP–Laban)	Valerio T. Montesclaros, Jr. (PDP–Laban)	Manuel O. Alameda, Sr. (PDP–Laban)	Henrich M. Pimentel (PDP–Laban)	
2022	Ruel D. Momo (HSDS)	Amado M. Layno, Jr. (HSDS)	Valerio T. Montesclaros, Jr. (HSDS)	Antonio C. Azarcon (HSDS)	Jose Dumagan Jr. (PDP–Laban)	
2025	Ruel D. Momo (PFP)	Henrich M. Pimentel (HSDS)	Valerio T. Montesclaros, Jr. (PFP)	Antonio C. Azarcon (PFP)	Jose Dumagan Jr. (PFP)	

=== 2nd district ===
- Population (2024):

Election year	Member (party)	Member (party)	Member (party)	Member (party)	Member (party)	Ref.
2016	Donell V. Polizon (Liberal)	Mary Grace G. Lim (Liberal)	Raul Millan (Liberal)	Apolonio Suan (until July 14, 2016) (NPC)	Rening Nazareno (Independent)	
2019	Conrad C. Cejoco (PDP–Laban)	Gines Ricky J. Sayawan (PDP–Laban)	Raul Millan (PDP–Laban)	Matgarita G. Garay (NPC)	Rening Nazareno (PDP–Laban)	
2022	Conrad C. Cejoco (PDP–Laban)	Gines Ricky J. Sayawan (PDP–Laban)	Anthony Joseph P. Cañedo (PDP–Laban)	Matgarita G. Garay (PDP–Laban)	Raul K. Salazar (PDP–Laban)	
2025	Joey S. Pama (PFP)	Gines Ricky J. Sayawan (PFP)	Anthony Joseph P. Cañedo (PFP)	Matgarita G. Garay (Nacionalista)	Raul K. Salazar (PFP)	
