= Agusan del Sur Provincial Board =

Legislative body of the province of Agusan del Sur, Philippines

Agusan del Sur Provincial Board Sangguniang Panlalawigan ng Agusan del Sur

Type
- Type: Unicameral
- Term limits: 3 terms (9 years)

Leadership
- Presiding Officer: Patricia Anne B. Plaza, NUP since June 30, 2025

Structure
- Seats: 14 board members 1 ex officio presiding officer
- Political groups: NUP (10) TBD (1) Nonpartisan (3)
- Length of term: 3 years
- Authority: Local Government Code of the Philippines

Elections
- Voting system: Plurality-at-large (regular members); Indirect election (ex officio members); Acclamation (sectoral member)
- Last election: May 12, 2025
- Next election: May 15, 2028

Meeting place
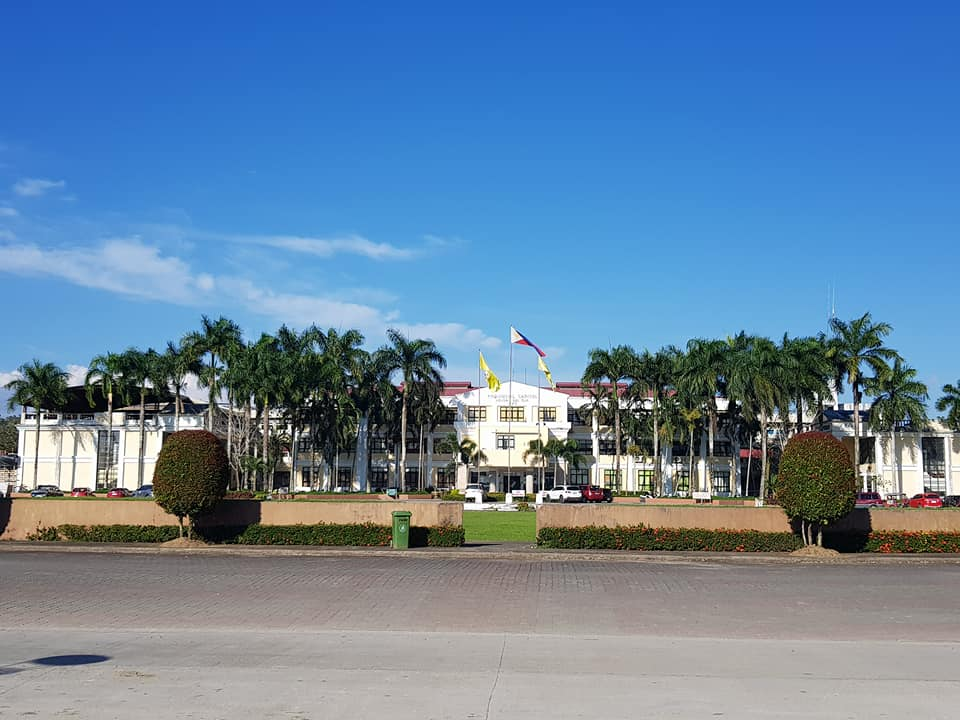
- Agusan del Sur Provincial Capitol, Prosperidad

The Agusan del Sur Provincial Board is the Sangguniang Panlalawigan (provincial legislature) of the Philippine province of Agusan del Sur.

The members are elected via plurality-at-large voting: the province is divided into two districts, each sending five members to the provincial board; the electorate votes for five members, with the five candidates with the highest number of votes being elected. The vice governor is the ex officio presiding officer, and only votes to break ties. The vice governor is elected via the plurality voting system province-wide.

== District apportionment ==
| Elections | No. of seats per district | | Ex officio seats | Reserved seats | Total seats |
| Elections | 1st | 2nd | Ex officio seats | Reserved seats | Total seats |
|---|---|---|---|---|---|
| 2004–present | 5 | 5 | 3 | 1 | 14 |

== List of members ==
An additional three ex officio members are the presidents of the provincial chapters of the Association of Barangay Captains, the Councilors' League, and the Sangguniang Kabataan. There is also a reserved seat for a representative of the indigenous peoples pursuant to the Indigenous Peoples' Rights Act of 1997.

=== Current members ===
These are the members after the 2025 local elections and 2023 barangay and SK elections:

- Vice Governor: Patricia Anne B. Plaza (NUP)

| Seat | Board member | Party | Start of term | End of term |
|---|---|---|---|---|
| 1st district | Cesar M. Alonde | NUP | June 30, 2019 | June 30, 2028 |
| 1st district | Gina A. Ceballos | NUP | June 30, 2022 | June 30, 2028 |
| 1st district | Jesryl E. Masendo | NUP | June 30, 2019 | June 30, 2028 |
| 1st district | Nilo D. Manpatilan | NUP | June 30, 2019 | June 30, 2028 |
| 1st district | Edgar O. Ga | NUP | June 30, 2022 | June 30, 2028 |
| 2nd district | Samuel E. Tortor | NUP | June 30, 2025 | June 30, 2028 |
| 2nd district | Edwin G. Elorde | NUP | June 30, 2019 | June 30, 2028 |
| 2nd district | Joseph D. Plaza | NUP | June 30, 2022 | June 30, 2028 |
| 2nd district | Pamela D. Yucosing | NUP | June 30, 2019 | June 30, 2028 |
| 2nd district | Avalota A. Cejas | NUP | June 30, 2022 | June 30, 2028 |
| ABC | Glenn Plaza | Nonpartisan | June 30, 2018 | January 1, 2023 |
| PCL | TBD | | | June 30, 2028 |
| SK | Doreen Pamile Miro | Nonpartisan | June 30, 2018 | January 1, 2023 |
| IPMR | Pablo Plaza | Nonpartisan | | |

=== Vice Governor ===
| Election year | Name | Party |
|---|---|---|
| 2001 | Virginia Getes | |
| 2004 | Virginia Getes | Lakas |
| 2007 | Santiago Cane | Lakas |
| 2010 | Santiago Cane | Lakas–Kampi |
| 2013 | Santiago Cane | NUP |
| 2016 | Samuel Tortor | NUP |
| 2019 | Samuel Tortor | NUP |
| 2022 | Samuel Tortor | NUP |
| 2025 | Patricia Anne B. Plaza | NUP |

=== 1st District ===
| Election year | Member (party) | Member (party) | Member (party) | Member (party) | Member (party) |
|---|---|---|---|---|---|
| 2004 | Aida Campos (Lakas) | Alfelito Bascug (Lakas) | Santiago Cane Jr. (Lakas) | Cesar Alonde (Lakas) | Allan Santiago (Lakas) |
| 2007 | Albin Magdamit (Lakas) | Alfelito Bascug (Lakas) | Virginia Getes (Independent) | Cesar Alonde (Lakas) | Allan Santiago (Lakas) |
| 2010 | Victor Plaza (Independent) | Nestor Corvera (Lakas-Kampi) | Virginia Getes (Lakas-Kampi) | Cesar Alonde (Lakas-Kampi) | Allan Santiago (Lakas-Kampi) |
| 2013 | Alfelito Bascug (NUP) | Nestor Corvera (NUP) | Edelberto Bastareche (NUP) | Genita Gerona (NUP) | Gina Ceballos (NUP) |
| 2016 | Alfelito Bascug (NUP) | Nestor Corvera (NUP) | Edelberto Bastareche (NUP) | Genita Gerona (NUP) | Santiago Cane Jr. (NUP) |
| 2019 | Cesar M. Alonde (NUP) | Jesryl Masendo (NUP) | Edelberto Bastareche (NUP) | Genita Gerona (NUP) | Nilo Manpatilan (NUP) |
| 2022 | Cesar M. Alonde (NUP) | Jesryl Masendo (NUP) | Gina Ceballos (NUP) | Edgar Ga (NUP) | Nilo Manpatilan (NUP) |
| 2025 | Cesar M. Alonde (NUP) | Gina A. Ceballos (NUP) | Jesryl E. Masendo (NUP) | Nilo D. Manpatilan (NUP) | Edgar O. Ga (NUP) |

=== 2nd District ===
| Election year | Member (party) | Member (party) | Member (party) | Member (party) | Member (party) |
|---|---|---|---|---|---|
| 2004 | Jenny de Asis (Lakas) | Salimar Mondejar (Lakas) | Jose Bundilla (Lakas) | Timoteo Prochina (Lakas) | Glenn Plaza (Lakas) |
| 2007 | Jenny de Asis (Lakas) | Jose Bunilla (Lakas) | Emmanuel Dairo (Lakas) | Timoteo Prochina (Lakas) | Samuel Tortor (Lakas) |
| 2010 | Agusani Ananoria (Lakas-Kampi) | Jose Bunilla (Lakas-Kampi) | Emmanuel Dairo (Lakas-Kampi) | Gilbert Elorde (Lakas-Kampi) | Samuel Tortor (Lakas-Kampi) |
| 2013 | Hazel del Rosario (NUP) | Edward Plaza (NUP) | Edwin Demegillo (NUP) | Gilbert Elorde (NUP) | Samuel Tortor (NUP) |
| 2016 | Hazel del Rosario (NUP) | Edward Plaza (NUP) | Edwin Demegillo (NUP) | Gilbert Elorde (NUP) | Agusani Ananoria (NUP) |
| 2019 | Hazel del Rosario (NUP) | Edwin G. Elorde (NUP) | Edwin Demegillo (NUP) | Pamela D. Yucosing (NUP) | Allan Lim (NUP) |
| 2022 | Joseph Plaza (NUP) | Edwin G. Elorde (NUP) | Avalota Cejas (NUP) | Pamela D. Yucosing (NUP) | Allan Lim (NUP) |
| 2025 | Samuel E. Tortor (NUP) | Edwin G. Elorde (NUP) | Joseph D. Plaza (NUP) | Pamela D. Yucosing (NUP) | Avalota A. Cejas (NUP) |
