= Governor of Agusan del Norte =

Local chief executive

- Gobernador ng Agusan del Norte (Filipino)
- Incumbent; Angelica Amante since June 30, 2022
- Style: Honorable (formal); Mr./Madame Governor (informal)
- Seat: Agusan Del Norte Provincial Capitol
- Term length: 3 years
- Inaugural holder: Consuelo V. Calo
- Formation: June 17, 1967
- Website: Official Website of the Province of Agusan Del Norte

The governor of Agusan del Norte is the local chief executive of the Philippine province of Agusan del Norte. The position was created in 1967, following the split of the province of Agusan into two: Agusan del Norte and Agusan del Sur. The officials of the province of Agusan continued to serve as the provincial officials of Agusan del Norte.

== List ==
No.	Term	Portrait	Name	Remarks
1	1967–1986		Consuelo V. Calo	Previously served as the last governor of Agusan from 1966 to 1967.
*	1986		Jose T. Gonzales	Officer in Charge; Appointed as Interim Governors during the transition period of the Aquino Government.
*	1986–1987		Jesus S. Delfin	Officer in Charge; Appointed as Interim Governors during the transition period of the Aquino Government.
2	1988–1995		Eduardo L. Rama	
3	1995–2004		Ma. Angelica Rosedell M. Amante	
4	2004–2013		Erlpe John M. Amante	
5	2013–2019		Ma. Angelica Rosedell M. Amante	
6	2019–2022		Dale B. Corvera	
7	2022–present		Ma. Angelica Rosedell M. Amante	
