= Lawrence Fortun =

Filipino lawyer and politician (born 1971)

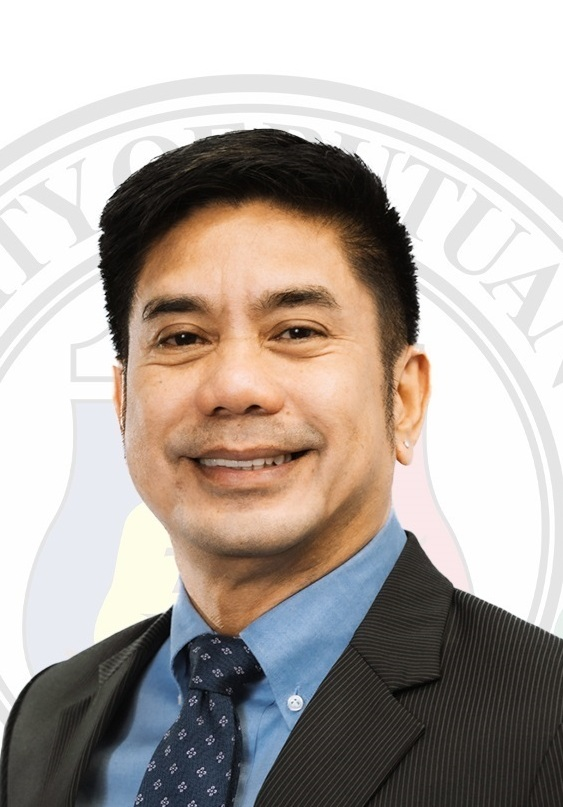
- Official portrait, 2025

Mayor of Butuan
- Incumbent
- Assumed office June 30, 2025
- Vice Mayor: Rey Desiata
- Preceded by: Ronnie Vicente Lagnada

Vice Mayor of Butuan
- In office June 30, 2022 – June 30, 2025
- Mayor: Ronnie Vicente Lagnada
- Preceded by: Jose Aquino II
- Succeeded by: Rey Desiata
- In office June 30, 2010 – June 30, 2013
- Mayor: Ferdinand M. Amante, Jr.
- Preceded by: Dino Claudio Sanchez
- Succeeded by: Angelo S. Calo

Member of the Philippine House of Representatives from Agusan del Norte's 1st district
- In office June 30, 2013 – June 30, 2022
- Preceded by: Jose Aquino II
- Succeeded by: Jose Aquino II

Member of the Butuan City Council
- In office June 30, 2007 – June 30, 2010

Personal details
- Born: August 7, 1971 (age 55) Butuan, Agusan del Norte, Philippines
- Party: Nacionalista (2016–present)
- Other political affiliations: Liberal (2007–2016)
- Spouse: Marie Therese Fontanilla-Fortun
- Children: 3
- Education: Father Saturnino Urios University (BA); San Sebastian College – Recoletos (LL.B)
- Profession: Lawyer

Lawrence Lemuel Hernandez Fortun, also known as Law Fortun, (born August 7, 1971) is a Filipino lawyer and politician who has served as the mayor of Butuan since 2025. He previously served as vice mayor of Butuan from 2022 to 2025 and from 2010 to 2013, and as a member of the House of Representatives of the Philippines representing Agusan del Norte's 1st congressional district from 2013 to 2022.

== Early life and education ==
Fortun was born on August 7, 1971, in Butuan, the son of Camilo Fortun and Geraldine Hernandez-Fortun of San Fernando, La Union. His father was a former member of the Butuan City Council and an opposition leader during the Marcos regime.

He graduated from Father Saturnino Urios University with a degree in political science. He finished his law degree at San Sebastian College – Recoletos Manila and was admitted to the bar in 2001.

== Career ==
=== Early career ===
Before joining politics, he was an active law practitioner in Manila. He also served as executive director of the National Institute for Policy Studies and was a legal consultant to the Department of Education, the Committee on Rules of the House of Representatives, and the Commission on Appointments.

=== Political career ===
Fortun's political career began when he was elected to the Butuan City Council in 2007. Thereafter he was elected vice mayor in 2010 and led the council into passing landmark legislations such as the Butuan City Watershed Code, the Butuan City Public-Private Partnership Code, the Butuan City Gender and Development Code, the Organic Farming Code, the Butuan City Shelter Code and the Ordinance Creating the Persons with Disabilities Office. He introduced the codification, tracking and archiving system that contributed to the transparency and efficiency of the council. Under his watch, the Butuan City Council was chosen National Finalist in a Search for Most Outstanding Sangguniang Panlungsod by the Philippine Councilors League (PCL) and the Department of the Interior and Local Government (DILG).

Official portrait during 16th Congress

He sought for higher office in the 2013 Philippine general election where he ran and won for a seat in the House of Representatives to represent the 1st district of Agusan del Norte (Butuan City and Las Nieves).

In congress, he was the principal author of R.A. No. 11510 or the Alternative Learning System Act and R.A. No. 11643 granting survivorship benefits to families of deceased retirees of the National Prosecution Service. He also sponsored legislations that were passed on third and final Reading including HB 7836, providing stronger protection against rape and sexual abuse and exploitation; HB 8097 reforming the Solo Parents Welfare Act; HB 5869 expanding the Anti-Violence Against Women and their Children Act; HB 8179 or the Sustainable Forest Management Act; HB 5869, or the Expanded Anti-Violence Against Women and their Children (E-VAWC) Act; HB 5989 for the creation of the Department of Disaster Resilience; HB 7036, or the Security of Tenure Act; and HB 9147, or the Single-Use Plastic Products Regulation Act.

Fortun took positions consistent with rule of law and human rights on several controversial issues in the House. He was among the few members who voted against the Death Penalty Bill and was the lone dissenter in the Committee on Justice against the bill lowering the minimum age of criminal liability from 15 years old to 9 years of age. In the impeachment proceedings against former Chief Justice Lourdes Sereno, he was one of only four committee members to oppose the committee’s policy not to allow counsels for the respondent to cross-examine witnesses and resource persons. He also was among the few House members who opposed the P1,000.00 budget for the Commission on Human Rights saying “Congress should strengthen democratic institutions, not weaken them.” Fortun was one of 20 legislators who introduced a resolution upholding the independence of the Ombudsman at the height of attacks against the office in 2017. He vigorously opposed the non-renewal of the franchise of ABS-CBN.

== Interests ==
Fortun is a sports enthusiast. He is into running, cycling, badminton and football. He is a member of the Board of Governors of the Philippine Football Federation serving from 2019 to 2023 and President of the Butuan-Agusan Norte Football Association.

== Personal life ==
Fortun is married to Marie Therese Fontanilla-Fortun. They have three sons.
