= 2006 Dinagat Islands creation plebiscite =

- 2 December 2006
- Do you approve of the creation of the Province of Dinagat Islands into a distinct and independent province comprising the municipalities of Basilisa, Cagdianao, Dinagat, Libjo (Albor), Loret, San Jose and Tubajon in the Province of Surigao del Norte, pursuant to Republic Act No. 9355?

Results
Choice	Votes	%
Yes	70,058	52.60%
No	63,144	47.40%
Valid votes	133,202	100.00%
Invalid or blank votes	0	0.00%
Total votes	133,202	100.00%
Registered voters/turnout	297,959	44.7%

The Dinagat Islands creation plebiscite was a plebiscite on the creation of the Province of Dinagat Islands from Surigao del Norte province in the Philippines. The plebiscite was held on December 2, 2006, and the results were announced on December 5, 2006.

== Referendum question ==
The Dinagat Islands creation plebiscite was supervised and officiated by the COMELEC pursuant to Resolution No. 7743.

The question of the said plebiscite was:

DO YOU APPROVE OF THE CREATION OF THE PROVINCE OF DINAGAT ISLANDS INTO A DISTINCT AND INDEPENDENT PROVINCE COMPRISING THE MUNICIPALITIES OF BASILISA, CAGDIANAO, DINAGAT, LIBJO (ALBOR), LORETO, SAN JOSE AND TUBAJON IN THE PROVINCE OF SURIGAO DEL NORTE, PURSUANT TO REPUBLIC ACT NO. 9355

== Results ==
The seven towns in Dinagat Island, five towns overwhelmingly voted for provincehood, with San Jose, the headquarters of the Philippine Benevolent Missionaries Association, having the highest turnout at 91.9%. Across the Dinagat Sound in Siargao, the "no" votes prevailed, but only 38% of registered voters turned out. In the Mindanao mainland, the no votes also prevailed, with also a low turnout. In the provincial capital of Surigao City, majority of the 44% who turned out were against provincehood.

Plebiscite for the approval of Republic Act 9355
Choice	Votes	%
For	70,058	52.60
Against	63,144	47.40
Required majority		50.00
Total	133,202	100.00
Registered voters/turnout	297,959	44.70

San Jose was chosen as the capital of the new province.

== See also ==
- 2001 Zamboanga Sibugay creation plebiscite, which created the province of Zamboanga Sibugay out of Zamboanga del Sur
- 2013 Davao Occidental creation plebiscite, which created the province of Davao Occidental out of Davao del Sur
- 2022 Maguindanao division plebiscite, which divided the province of Maguindanao into two smaller provinces
