= List of historical markers of the Philippines in Caraga =

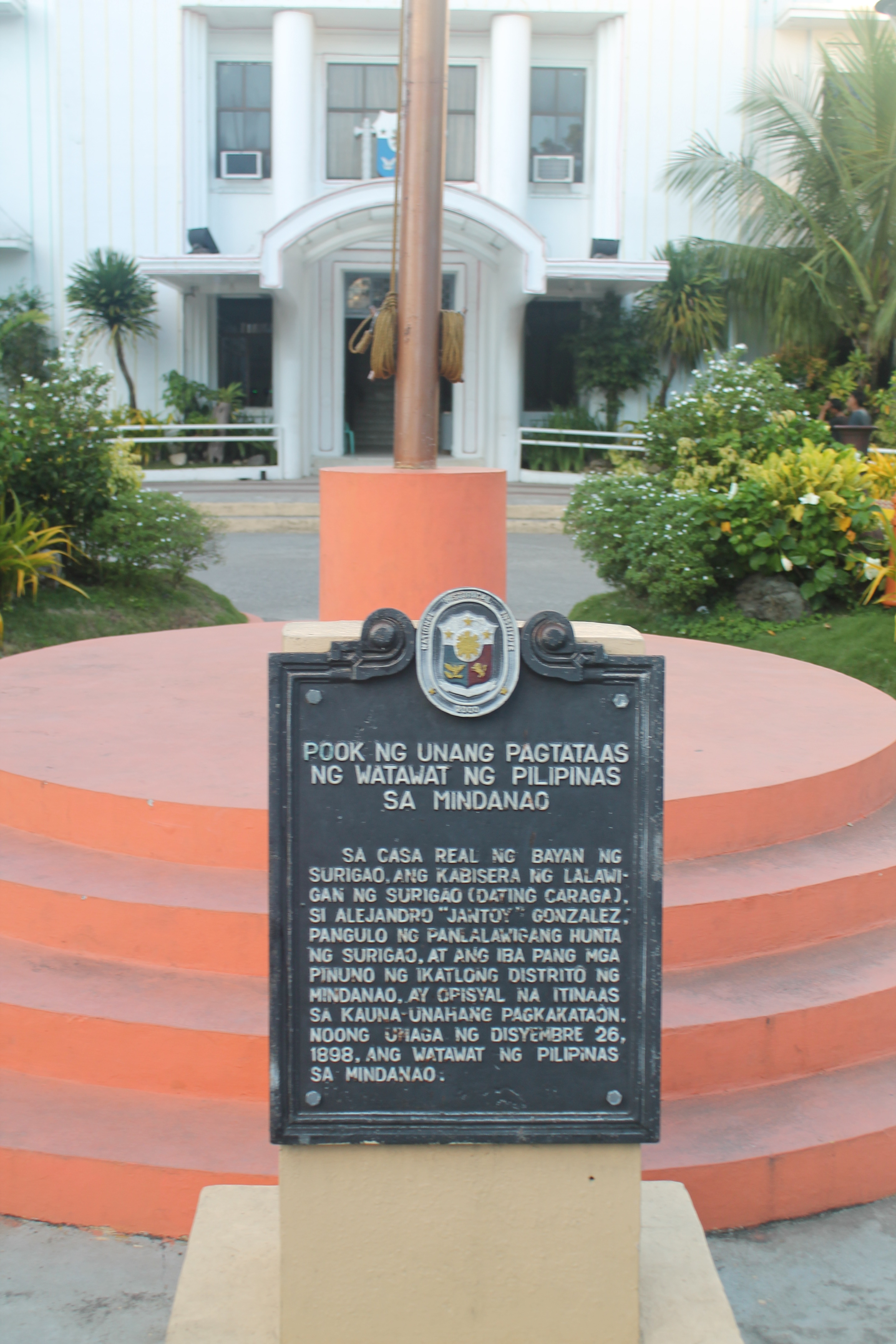
Site of the first raising of the Philippine flag in Mindanao, Surigao City Hall, Surigao City, Surigao del Norte

This list of historical markers installed by the National Historical Commission of the Philippines (NHCP) in Caraga is an annotated list of people, places, or events in the region that have been commemorated by cast-iron plaques issued by the said commission. The plaques themselves are permanent signs installed in publicly visible locations on buildings, monuments, or in special locations.

While many Cultural Properties have historical markers installed, not all places marked with historical markers are designated into one of the particular categories of Cultural Properties.

This article lists six markers from the Caraga Region, including one that is part of the Quincentennial historical markers series.

== Agusan del Norte ==
This table lists one marker from the province of Agusan del Norte.

| Marker title | Description | Location | Language | Date issued | Image |
|---|---|---|---|---|---|
| The Raising of the Philippine Flag in Mindanao | Where the flag of the Vatican was finally lowered and replaced by Philippine flag, effectively enacting the administration of the Philippine Revolution in Mindanao. | Guingona Park, Butuan | English | January 19, 1999 | |

== Agusan del Sur ==
There are no markers from the province of Agusan del Sur.

== Dinagat Islands ==
This table lists two markers from the province of Dinagat Islands.

| Marker title | Description | Location | Language | Date issued | Image |
|---|---|---|---|---|---|
| Desolation Point | Forces that first signalled General Douglas MacArthur's return to the Philippines | Desolation Point, Loreto | English | | |
| Gibusong; Ruta ng Ekspedisyong Magallanes–Elcano sa Pilipinas (Note: Gibusong: Route of the Magellan–Elcano Expedition in the Philippines) | From Hinunangan (now Southern Leyte), the expedition reached the site on March 25, 1521. | Gibusong, Loreto | Filipino | March 25, 2021 | |

== Surigao del Norte ==
This table lists three markers from the province of Surigao del Norte.

| Marker title | Description | Location | Language | Date issued | Image |
|---|---|---|---|---|---|
| Kapitolyo ng Surigao (Note: Surigao Capitol) | Built in the style of neoclassical-art deco. | Surigao del Norte Capitol, Surigao City | Filipino | May 22, 2023 | |
| Pook ng Unang Pagtataas ng Watawat ng Pilipinas sa Mindanao (Note: Site of the first Philippine flag raising in Mindanao) | Site of the first Philippine flag raising in Mindanao. Headed by Alejandro "Jantoy" Gonzalez. | Surigao City Hall, Surigao City | Filipino | December 29, 2000 | |
| Simbahan ng Del Carmen (Note: Church of Del Carmen) | Church first established around 1622 or 1635. | Our Lady of Mt. Carmel Parish Church, Del Carmen | Filipino | October 20, 2025 (turned-over on January 16, 2026) | |

== Surigao del Sur ==
There are no markers from the province of Surigao del Sur.

== See also ==
- List of Cultural Properties of the Philippines in Caraga

== Bibliography ==
- National Historical Institute (1994). Historical Markers: Regions V-XIII. National Historical Institute.
- National Historical Institute (2008). Historical Markers (1992 - 2006). National Historical Institute.
- A list of sites and structures with historical markers, as of 16 January 2012
- A list of institutions with historical markers, as of 16 January 2012
