= USS Bryant =

Fletcher-class destroyer

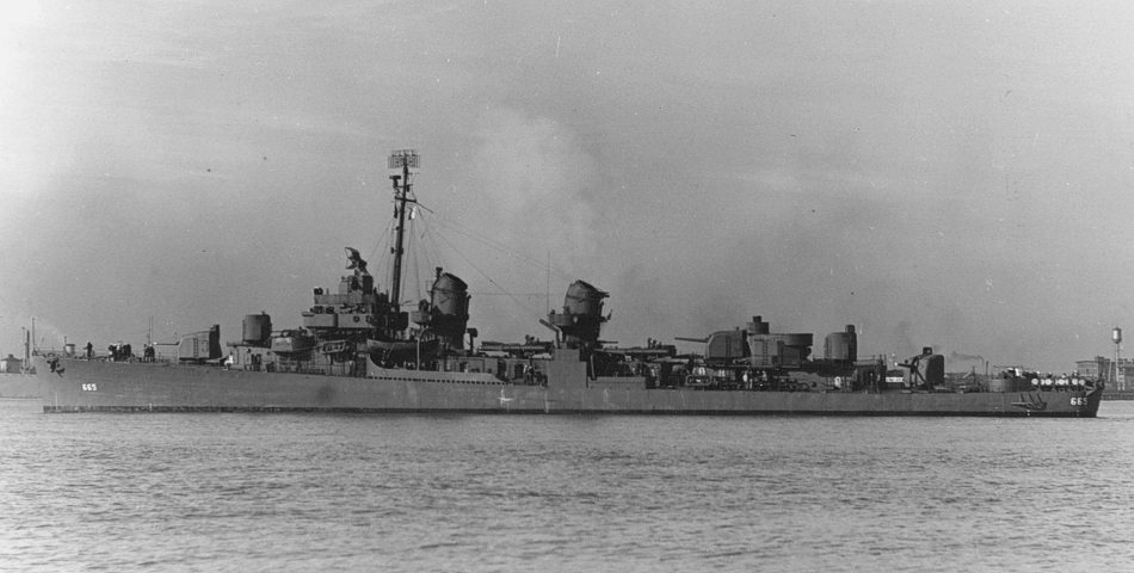
- USS Bryant (DD-665), Charleston, 7 January 1944

History

United States
- Name: USS Bryant
- Namesake: Rear Admiral Samuel W. Bryant
- Builder: Charleston Navy Yard
- Laid down: 30 December 1942
- Launched: 29 May 1943
- Commissioned: 4 December 1943
- Decommissioned: 15 January 1947
- Stricken: 30 June 1968
- Fate: Scrapped, April 1976

General characteristics
- Class & type: Fletcher-class destroyer
- Displacement: 2,050 tons
- Length: 376 ft 5 in (114.73 m)
- Beam: 39 ft 7 in (12.07 m)
- Draft: 17 ft 9 in (5.41 m)
- Propulsion: 60,000 shp (45 MW); geared turbines; 2 propellers
- Speed: 35 knots (65 km/h; 40 mph)
- Range: 6,500 nautical miles at 15 kt; (12,000 km at 30 km/h)
- Complement: 329
- Armament: 5 × 5 in (130 mm)/38 guns, 4 × 40 mm AA guns, 4 × 20 mm guns AA guns, 10 × 21 inch (533 mm). torpedo tubes, 6 × depth charge projectors, 2 × depth charge tracks

USS Bryant (DD-665) was a Fletcher-class destroyer of the United States Navy, named for Rear Admiral Samuel W. Bryant (1877–1938).

Bryant was launched 29 May 1943 by Charleston Navy Yard; sponsored by Mrs. Samuel W. Bryant, widow of Rear Admiral Bryant; and commissioned 4 December 1943.

== 1944 ==
After fitting out at the Charleston Navy Yard, Bryant conducted a month-long shakedown cruise near Bermuda before returning to the Charleston Navy Yard on 28 February 1944 for a 10-day, post-shakedown availability. The destroyer then set sail for the Boston Navy Yard and arrived there on the 13th. Two days later, she and McNair got underway for the Pacific as escorts for Wasp. The trio transited the Panama Canal on the 20th and then steamed north for a one-day replenishment stop at San Diego before heading on toward Hawaii. On 3 April, Bryant entered Pearl Harbor and, following three days of exercises there, devoted the remainder of April and the beginning of May to a yard availability to repair leaks in her reduction gear and fireroom hull.

Her repairs completed, the warship conducted antisubmarine warfare patrols and participated in landing and bombardment exercises near Pearl Harbor during the latter half of May. She got underway on 29 May for Eniwetok, the staging area for the invasion of the Marianas. On 11 June, she set out for Saipan in the Northern Attack Force and spent D-Day, the 15th, in the transport screen. For the next month and a half, the destroyer patrolled the waters surrounding Saipan and Tinian on radar picket station, occasionally providing fire support and illuminating fire to help troops fighting ashore.

Bryant returned to Eniwetok Atoll on 5 August and settled in alongside Piedmont for 10 days of engineering repairs. Following a six-day tender availability at Purvis Bay, she stood out to sea on 6 September for the Palaus. During the morning watch of the 12th, Bryant approached Peleliu in the destroyer screen of Task Group 32.5 (TG 32.5), which consisted of the flagship Louisville, Idaho, Mississippi, and Portland. When firing positions had been achieved, the roar of the battlewagons’ 14-inch (356 mm) guns heralded the opening of a three-day long pattern of rotating bombardment by air and sea. Daily, Bryant took leave of her screening duties with the capital ships to close the beach and dump 40-millimeter rounds on enemy positions which threatened the operations of the underwater demolition teams (UDTs). On 16 September, the day after the initial landings on Peleliu, Vice Admiral Theodore S. Wilkinson received Admiral William F. Halsey's order to "seize Ulithi as early as practicable…with resources at hand." Bryant served as part of the screen for the 323rd Regimental Combat Team tasked with occupying the atoll, needed as an advance base for operations to liberate the Philippines. The landings, which took place on 23 September, encountered no opposition because the Japanese garrison had already abandoned the islets and moved to Yap.

A decision by the American high command to cancel the landings at Yap and Mindanao in favor of accelerating the timetable for operations against Leyte and Luzon afforded Bryant little time to replenish her depleted supply of fuel and ammunition. On 24 September, she departed Ulithi, made a brief stop at Kossol Roads, and reached Seeadler Harbor on the 28th for two weeks of voyage repairs, drills, and recreation. On 11 October, she "topped off" her fuel and commenced a week-long passage to Leyte Gulf. During the early morning hours of 20 October, Bryant stood off Leyte approximately 12,000 yards (11,000 m) from Catmon Hill conducting indirect fire in support of the troops landing with the Southern Attack Force near Dulag. Later in the day, she helped to silence a mortar position which had earlier damaged Bennion with a near miss.

On the 21st, she joined TG 77.2 and readied herself to meet a Japanese attempt to force through Surigao Strait and destroy the American transports in Leyte Gulf. Surigao Strait — a waterway bracketed by Leyte and Panaon Islands to the north and west and by Mindanao and Dinagat Islands to the south and east — constitutes the southern approach to the gulf. Rear Admiral Jesse B. Oldendorf deployed his battleships and cruisers across the northern mouth of the strait and arrayed his destroyers on either flank. The Japanese strike force under Vice Admiral Shoji Nishimura — composed of the battleships Yamashiro and Fusō, the heavy cruiser Mogami, and four destroyers — steamed into the strait from the south during mid-watch on the 25th. Deployed to the east side of the strait, Bryant, Halford, and Robinson comprised one of the three destroyer sections assigned to screen Rear Admiral Oldendorf's left-flank cruisers. By the time Bryant closed within range of the enemy column, many of his ships had been sunk or were burning as a consequence of the right-flank destroyers’ torpedo attack and the gunfire of the battleships and cruisers in the battle line. At 03:39, under the cover of salvos from the battleships and cruisers, the trio commenced their attack to the starboard side of the enemy battle line as it pressed northward. Bryant closed to 8,800 yards (8,000 m) and loosed a spread of five torpedoes, none of which found their target, and then retired unscathed to a position near Hibuson Island.

After receiving word that American escort carriers had come under fire in the Battle off Samar, TG 77.2 discontinued pursuit of Nishimura's force and steamed to aid the baby flattops. When the task group arrived too late to influence events near Samar, it dispatched Bryant to a radar picket station between Suluan and Dinagat Islands. Although the majority of 7th Fleet units returned to Ulithi at the end of October to rest after the nearly-continuous operations of the summer, Bryant, three battleships, four cruisers, and 12 other destroyers remained in Surigao Strait lest the Japanese attempt another thrust through that entrance to Leyte Gulf. No surface threat materialized, but the task group endured repeated air attacks on 1 November which, according to the destroyer's war diaries, the Japanese pilots pressed home with "fanatic determination." Though Bryant splashed one of the enemy dive bombers, the kamikaze suicide planes wreaked havoc on the destroyers, damaging five and sending Abner Read to the bottom. After two more weeks of uneventful patrols in Surigao Strait, she departed those dangerous waters and headed for the Admiralty Islands, tallying an enemy plane en route.

She reached Seeadler Harbor on 21 November and promptly commenced a much-needed six days of voyage repairs and replenishment. The destroyer set sail on the 28th, fueled from Nashville at sea, and reached Leyte Gulf on 2 December. She patrolled off Leyte for two weeks before anchoring in San Pedro Bay. There, Bryant joined the first resupply echelon bound for Mindoro since that island had been invaded on the 15th. The supply convoy departed late on the 19th with Bryant, the primary fighter director for the convoy, responsible for coordinating combat air patrol (CAP). Two days into the voyage, she stood a severe test on that capability. Following an inconsequential dawn raid by two Nakajima Ki-43 "Oscar" Army fighters, the Japanese fell upon the convoy that evening with a tenacious attack involving approximately 30 planes. As the enemy pilots pressed toward the landing ships located in the center of the formation, antiaircraft fire from Bryant felled one enemy flier and assisted in the splashing of another. However, three "Oscars" broke through the screen and crashed into LST-460, LST-749, and the Liberty ship Juan de Fuca, sending both of the amphibious ships to the bottom.

The next morning, the convoy reached Mindoro, and the destroyers formed a circular screen about five miles (8.0 km) from the beach to cover the unloading of the remaining landing ships. At 09:45, as Bryant waited on station, her commanding officer sighted a Mitsubishi A6M "Zeke" fighter at 4,000 yards (4,000 m). The pilot commenced a suicide run, and the destroyer maneuvered furiously to unmask her battery to starboard. Despite hits from Bryant's 20-millimeter and 40-millimeter guns, the kamikaze seemed destined to strike her at the number 2 stack. However, the plane overshot the target, the right wing narrowly clearing a 40-millimeter mount, and splashed 50 yards (50 m) away just even with the bridge. As the plane disappeared beneath the waves, it exploded, showering the agile warship with fragments of the tail assembly. These punctured her portside shell plating in numerous places and injured one of her crewmen. That evening, after the LSTs unloaded, the convoy reformed and returned to Leyte where Bryant anchored for the remainder of the year.

== 1945 ==
On 2 January 1945, she departed Leyte Gulf in the screen of the battleships and cruisers in TG 77.2's fire-support unit. During the approach to Luzon, the Japanese subjected the task group to a series of heavy air raids which inflicted damage on several ships. Early on the 9th, Bryant closed the beach to provide fire support for the Lingayen landings, then patrolled the area, weathering heavy seas and high winds, during the next week to parry a possible incursion by the enemy. Following a two-day visit to Leyte, the warship entered Ulithi lagoon on 26 January for three weeks of replenishment and preparation for the invasion of Iwo Jima.

On 10 February, she got underway in company with TG 52.19, conducted rehearsals near Saipan from the 12th through the 14th, and reached Iwo Jima two days later. While the island received a ferocious pounding from air and sea during the two days before the landings, Bryant provided close-in support to cover beach reconnaissance and minesweepers. On the morning of the 19th, the 4th and 5th Marine Divisions landed on the eastern shore of Iwo Jima, inaugurating a bloody and hard-fought campaign for the heavily fortified base.

On 27 February, Bryant came under heavy fire from a Japanese shore battery, but was saved by the efforts of the USS West Virginia. For the balance of February and into March, Bryant patrolled her fire support area lashing out at enemy targets when needed and occasionally acting as a radar picket.

On 9 March, she set sail for the Western Carolines. En route, the destroyer made a refueling stop at Saipan, before putting in at Ulithi on the 13th for a week of voyage repairs and tender availability in preparation for the invasion of Okinawa. On 21 March, as part of Task Force 54 (TF 54), she departed for the Ryūkyūs in the antisubmarine screen of the minesweepers. The destroyer rendezvoused with a minesweeping group on the 25th and shepherded them during two days sweeping mines to the west of Okinawa. Over the five days following, she alternated between radar picket duty and gun-fire missions on Japanese efforts to improve their beach defenses.

On 1 April, Bryant started two weeks of radar picket duty. Her relatively quiet patrols contrasted with the grim experiences of destroyers on station elsewhere. On 16 April, however, her luck changed. That morning, the Japanese launched a 165-plane kamikaze mission, the third of 10 kikusui or "floating chrysanthemum" attacks launched during the Okinawa campaign. Laffey suffered the first and most intense attack of the day, being struck by no less than six kamikazes, four bombs, and numerous near misses. Bryant received word that Laffey required assistance and rushed to aid her. After turning back sporadic attacks, she found herself the target of a coordinated attack by six enemy planes. First, three "Zeke" fighters closed the warship in a shallow glide. Her port batteries dispatched one, and the CAP splashed another; but the third attacker, though hit repeatedly and trailing smoke, made it through and crashed into Bryant just below the bridge near the main radio room. A bomb from the kamikaze then exploded, engulfing the entire bridge in flames and doing major damage to communication, fire-control and radar equipment. Damage control teams, standing by to assist Laffey, extinguished the major fires within a couple of minutes and soon the wounded destroyer was making 23 knots (43 km/h). Still, despite the prompt response, the attack exacted a heavy toll. In addition to her human casualties, 34 dead and 33 wounded, the destroyer suffered material damage enough to require repairs in the United States, and so she limped back to Kerama Retto to begin temporary repairs.

On 27 April, with the patching necessary for a homeward voyage completed, she got underway for the United States. Steaming via Guam, Eniwetok, and Pearl Harbor, Bryant reached San Francisco on 28 May and, the next day, settled in for a yard overhaul at the United Engineering Co., Ltd., at Alameda. In addition to repair of the battle damage, the yard endeavored to improve her antiaircraft armament. However, the work stretched out over almost four months, and the war ended during the interlude. Finally, on 20 September, she stood out for a six-day "ready for sea" period which exposed a number of electrical problems that remained uncorrected by her overhaul. Declared unfit for duty by her commanding officer, the destroyer steamed southward to San Diego. Soon after her arrival on the 27th, Bryant commenced preparations for inactivation and was eventually placed in commission, in reserve, on 9 July 1946. After another 18 months in that bureaucratic limbo, she was decommissioned at last on 15 January 1947. She remained a part of the Pacific Reserve Fleet for nearly 30 years. Then, on 30 June 1968, her name was struck from the Navy List, she was sold in April 1976 to Luria Brothers, and scrapped in July 1976.

== Awards ==
- Bryant received the Navy Unit Commendation and seven battle stars during her World War II career.
