= USS Long =

Clemson-class destroyer

Coordinates: 16°12′N 120°11′E

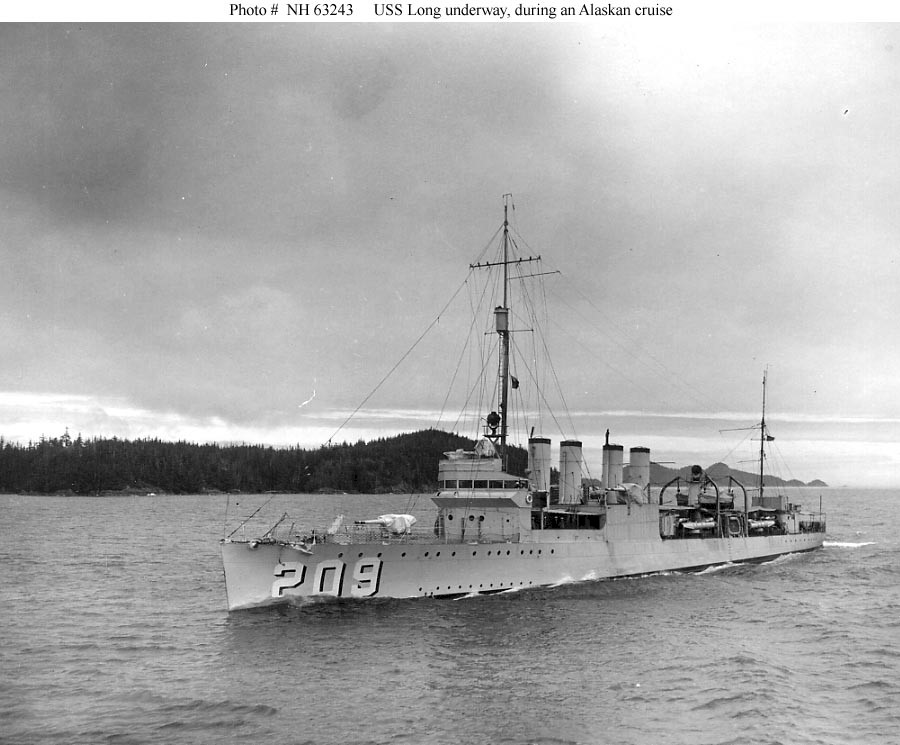
- USS Long (DD-209) underway during an Alaskan cruise, circa 1937

History

United States
- Name: Long
- Namesake: John Davis Long
- Builder: William Cramp & Sons, Philadelphia
- Yard number: 475
- Laid down: 23 September 1918
- Launched: 26 April 1919
- Commissioned: 20 October 1919
- Decommissioned: 30 December 1922
- Recommissioned: 29 March 1930
- Reclassified: Destroyer minesweeper, DMS-12, 19 November 1940
- Fate: Sunk by kamikazes in Lingayen Gulf, 6 January 1945

General characteristics
- Class & type: Clemson-class destroyer
- Displacement: 1,190 tons
- Length: 314 ft 5 in (95.8 m)
- Beam: 31 ft 9 in (9.7 m)
- Draft: 9 ft 3 in (2.8 m)
- Speed: 35 knots (65 km/h; 40 mph)
- Complement: 101 officers and enlisted
- Armament: 8 × 4 in (100 mm) guns; 2 × 3 in (76 mm) gun; 12 × 21 in (533 mm) torpedo tubes

USS Long (DD-209/DMS-12), named for John Davis Long (1838–1915), Secretary of the Navy from 1897 to 1902, was a Clemson-class destroyer of the United States Navy.

== Construction and commissioning ==
Long was laid down by the William Cramp & Sons at Philadelphia on 23 September 1918, launched on 26 April 1919 by Mrs. Arnold Knapp (née Julia James Long) and commissioned on 20 October 1919.

== Service history ==
After shakedown along the United States East Coast, Long sailed late in the year for the Mediterranean. Assigned to Destroyer Division 26, she patrolled the Adriatic and Mediterranean and served as station ship before steaming to the Philippines early in 1921 for duty with Asiatic station. Based at Cavite, Luzon, she patrolled the South China Sea until July 1922 when she was ordered to the United States. Long decommissioned at San Diego, California, 30 December 1922.

Long recommissioned at San Diego on 29 March 1930. Operating out of San Diego during the next decade, Long cruised primarily in the Pacific off North and Central America for division exercises and screen and plane guard duty. Between 1933 and 1935 she twice entered the rotating Reserve as part of Destroyer Squadron 20.

In 1940, she was converted to destroyer minesweeper, and reclassified DMS-12 on 19 November 1940.

=== World War II ===
Long operated along the United States West Coast and in Hawaiian waters with Mine Squadron 2. On 5 December 1941, she departed Pearl Harbor in the screen for Indianapolis. Following the Japanese attack on Pearl Harbor two days later, she returned there 9 December and began antisubmarine patrols. She also escorted ships among the Hawaiian Islands and between March and June 1942, made escort runs to Midway, Palmyra, and Canton.

Long left Pearl Harbor 30 June for patrol and escort duty in Alaskan waters. After colliding with Monaghan in heavy fog 27 July, she repaired at San Francisco, California, returning to Kodiak on 27 September for screen and antisubmarine patrols. During the Arctic winter, she patrolled the approaches to Adak and guarded convoys as American forces sought to defeat Japanese garrisons in the western Aleutians.

==== Alaska ====
Long took part in the unopposed occupation of Amchitka 12 January 1943, and while patrolling along the Island, helped repel Japanese air attacks 31 January and 1 February. Thence, she joined Rear Admiral Francis W. Rockwell's TF 51 on 3 May for the Invasion of Attu. Steaming through the heavy spring seas and blanketing fog of the Bering Sea, she closed on Attu on 11 May and swept for mines prior to the successful landings later that day.

Long continued escort and patrol operations for the occupations of Attu and Kiska through the summer, returning to Pearl Harbor on 16 September to escort merchantmen to San Francisco where she overhauled. After patrol in Hawaiian waters from 15 November to 22 January 1944, she escorted reinforcements to Roi and Namur in the Marshalls on 2 February, then joined TF 76 on 28 February in New Guinea waters. She served as an escort and swept mines in the conquest of the Admiralties early in March, then escorted convoys to and from Milne Bay, Guadalcanal, and Espiritu Santo from Cape Sudest.

==== Hollandia and Marianas ====
On 18 April, Long sailed for the invasion of the Hollandia (currently known as Jayapura) area; she entered Humboldt Bay 22 April, made an exploratory sweep, and then fired a close-in preinvasion bombardment. Long arrived at Guadalcanal early in May to prepare for the Marianas assault, for which she sailed 4 June. Arriving Saipan 13 June for preinvasion sweeps west of the island, Long served as radar picket and guard ship until 24 June, then after a voyage to the Marshalls, screened the battleship Pennsylvania during preinvasion bombardment of Guam beginning 12 July. After antisubmarine and convoy escort duty, Long joined TG 32.5 at Guadalcanal 16 August.

==== Palaus ====
Long sortied for the assault on the Palaus on 6 September, cleared mines off Peleliu and Angaur, and in Kossol Passage from 12 to 16 September, then had escort and patrol duty between the Palaus and Admiralties until joining the 7th Fleet on 4 October for the invasion of the Philippines.

==== Philippines ====
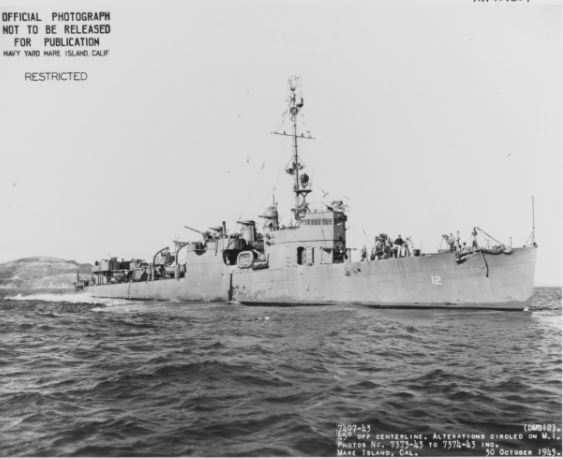
USS Long as minesweeper, Oct 1943

Leaving Seeadler Harbor 10 October with Minesweeping Unit 1, Long entered Leyte Gulf on 17 October. Spearheading the invasion, she cleared mines off Dinagat and Hibuson Islands, and in the Dulag-Tacloban approach channel. After sweeping Surigao Strait, she patrolled and served as smokescreen ship in Leyte Gulf until 23 October, when the destroyer joined the transport screen and steamed in convoy for Manus, arriving on 29 October.

==== Sunk by kamikazes at Lingayen Gulf ====
After repairs and training at Manus, Long departed 23 December to sweep for the landings at Lingayen Gulf, Luzon; her group was attacked 2 January 1945 in the Mindanao Sea in the first of the frequent air raids with which the Japanese attempted to repel the invasion of Luzon. Long began mine sweeps in Lingayen Gulf 6 January, evading and firing upon Japanese aircraft as she carried out her intricate mission. Shortly after noon, beginning her second run, Long spotted two Mitsubishi A6M Zeros heading for her.

Long went to 25 knots and opened fire, but a kamikaze crashed into her portside below the bridge about 1 foot above the waterline. With fires and explosions amidships, Long lost power and internal communications, and was unable to fight fires forward. Her commanding officer, Lieutenant Stanley Caplan, fearing an explosion in the forward magazine, gave permission for men trapped on the forecastle to leave the ship, but through a misunderstanding, the crew aft abandoned ship. All were quickly rescued by Hovey standing by to aid the burning but still seaworthy ship, in fact a total of 149 of Long's crew were picked up by the Hovey.

Lieutenant Caplan prepared to lead a salvage party and board Long from Apache, but continuing heavy air attacks prevented firefighting and salvage attempts. Later that afternoon a second plane attacked Long and exploded at the same spot, destroying the bridge and breaking the ship's back. Long capsized and sank the following morning, January 7. Around eighteen of the survivors rescued from the Long by Hovey perished when Hovey herself received an aerial torpedo to her aft engine room on January 7 around 450. Most of Hovey's survivors were rescued by the USS Chandler.

== Awards ==
Long received nine battle stars for World War II service.
