= Dinagat Island =

Island in the Philippines

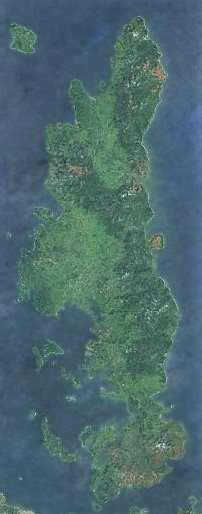
- Dinagat island satellite image captured by Sentinel-2 in 2016

- Location within Mindanao Location within Philippines

Geography
- Coordinates: 10°9′46″N 125°35′22″E
- Archipelago: Dinagat Islands
- Adjacent to: Philippine Sea; Surigao Strait
- Area: 802.12 km^{2} (309.70 sq mi)

Administration
- Philippines
- Region: Caraga
- Province: Dinagat Islands
- Municipalities: Basilisa; Cagdianao; Dinagat; Libjo; Loreto; San Jose; Tubajon
- Largest settlement: Basilisa (pop. 36,911)

Demographics
- Population: 106,951 (2000)
- Pop. density: 133.3/km^{2} (345.2/sq mi)
- Ethnic groups: Visayans (Surigaonon)

Additional information

Dinagat Island is an island located northeast of Mindanao in the Philippines.

Until December 2006, it was part of the province of Surigao del Norte. Being its main island, almost all municipalities of the province of Dinagat Islands are located on it.

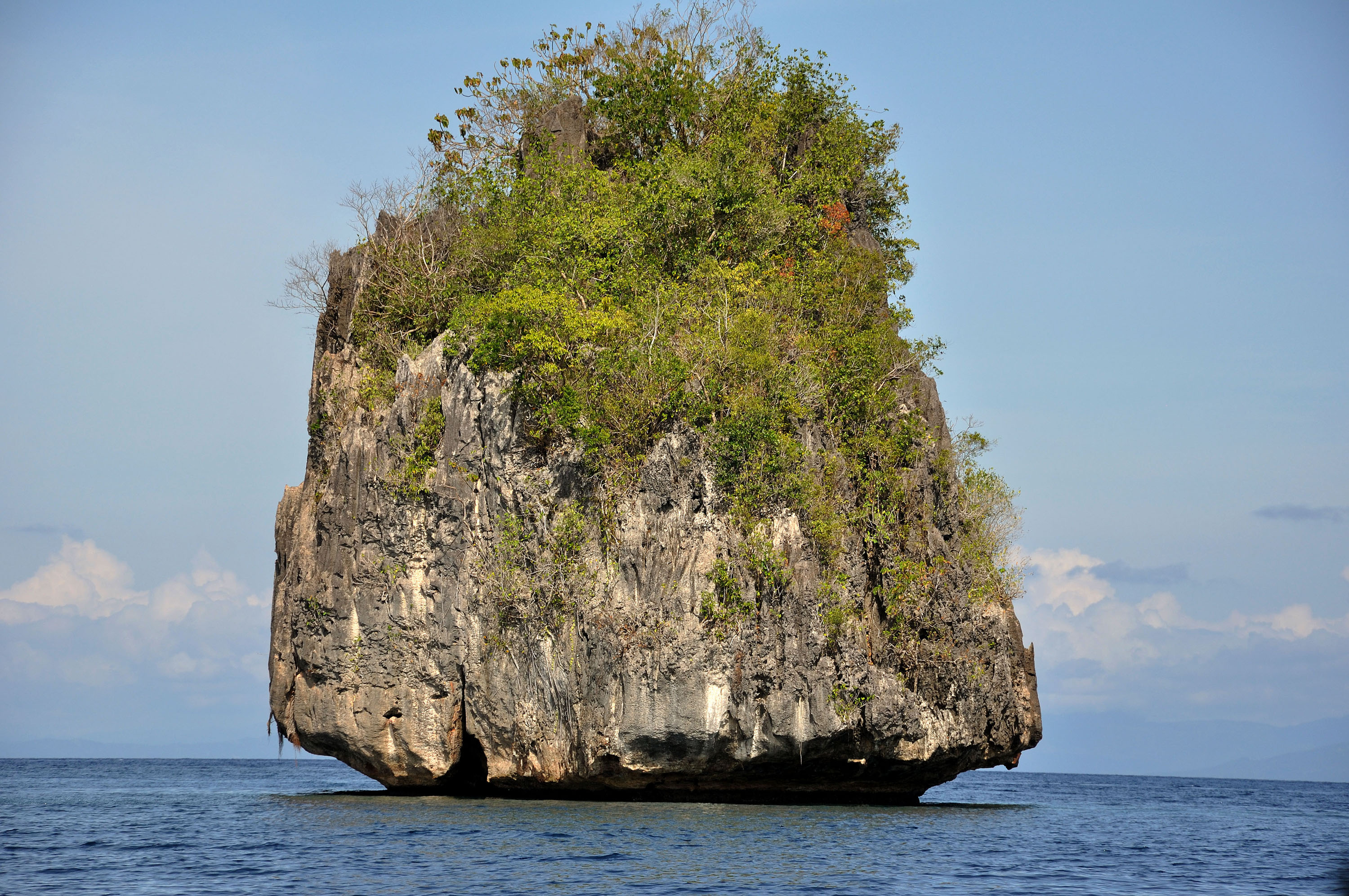
Nepenthes Viridis Islet, Dinagat Island
