= Dinagat Sound =

- Location within the Philippines
- Location: Dinagat Islands, Mindanao, Philippines
- Coordinates: 9°57′44.28″N 125°51′13.32″E
- Type: sound
- Part of: Philippine Sea

Dinagat Sound is an arm of the Philippine Sea that separates the islands of Dinagat (which form the sound's western shore) and Siargao, in the northeastern portion of Mindanao in the Philippines. It is one of Mindanao's major fishing grounds.
