= List of Cultural Properties of the Philippines in Caraga =

This list contains an overview of the government recognized Cultural Properties of the Philippines in Caraga. The list is based on the official lists provided by the National Commission on Culture and the Arts, National Historical Commission of the Philippines and the National Museum of the Philippines.

Cultural Property wmph identifier (Note: wmph is an internal identifier used by Wikimedia Philippines to identify the monument. This is not an official identifier, and only shown temporarily in the templates until the government creates an updated complete list.)	Site name	Description	Province	City or municipality	Address	Coordinates	Image
	Balangays	Balangays are large plank boats which were the main form of transportation in the precolonial era. These ancient balangays were found in what used to be the Kingdom of Butuan.	—	Butuan	National Museum – Butuan, Libertad	8°57′09″N 125°31′37″E	Upload file

== See also ==
- List of historical markers of the Philippines in Caraga
