= Church Body of Christ – Filipinista =

Filipino religious sect

- Classification: Independent Catholic/Independent Christian
- Polity: Episcopal
- Supreme Executive Bishop: David G. Sebial Sr.
- Associations: None (not in communion with IFI or other denominations)
- Region: Philippines (originally Mindanao)
- Liturgy: Latin rite (own Filipinista Missal, vernacular), ad orientem
- Headquarters: Chapel of the Holy Child Jesus, Brgy. Kitabog, Titay, Zamboanga Sibugay, Philippines
- Founder: Lucilo G. Miñoza
- Origin: 1966; Pagadian City, Philippines
- Separated from: Iglesia Filipina Independiente / Independent Church of Filipino Christians

The Church Body of Christ – Filipinista (Cebuano: Iglesia ang Lawas ni Kristo-Filipinista), simply known as CBCF or Filipinista, is an independent Christian religious organization that originated in the Philippines, particularly on the island of Mindanao, and was organized by His Eminence Reverend Lucilo G. Miñoza, a former IFI Priest assigned in Pagadian, Zamboanga del Sur. Its schism from Iglesia Filipina Independiente (IFI) and Independent Church of Filipino Christians (ICFC) was proclaimed in 1966 due to doctrinal positions and its quest to find the "real church" that Jesus Christ founded. The Church Body of Christ – Filipinista is not in communion with the Iglesia Filipina Independiente or any other religious denomination.

Its central office is located at the Chapel of the Holy Child Jesus in Brgy. Kitabog, Titay, Zamboanga Sibugay.

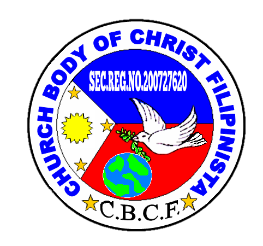
CBCF seal

== Theological basis for the Church's name ==
The Church Body of Christ Filipinista is believed to be the true church founded by Jesus Christ approximately 30-33 AD. Filipinistas believe that this church fulfills the prophecy from the book of Isaiah 11:10-11, which states:

> "...and in that day there shall be a root of Jesse, who shall stand as a banner to the people; for the Gentiles shall seek Him and His resting place shall be glorious. It shall come to pass in that day that the Lord shall set His hand again the second time to recover the remnant of His people who are left, from Assyria and Egypt, from Pathos and Cush, from Elam and Shinar, from Hamath and the islands of the sea."

The Church Body of Christ Filipinista bases its doctrinal position on the Holy Scripture, believing it to be the word of God. The term "Filipinista" is added to represent the Gentiles, who are predominantly Filipinos, that have been made members of the Church Body of Christ. This inclusion allows them to partake in all the glorious promises of Christ, as stated in Ephesians 3:4-6:

> "In reading this, then, you will be able to understand my insight into the mystery of Christ, which was not made known to people in other generations as it has now been revealed by the Spirit to God’s holy apostles and prophets. This mystery is that through the gospel the Gentiles are heirs together with Israel, members together of one body, and sharers together in the promise in Christ Jesus."

The belief that Gentiles are called into one Body, the Church, is supported by Colossians 3:15:

> "Let the peace of Christ rule in your hearts, since as members of one body you were called to peace. And be thankful."

The Church is identified as the Body of Christ, as preached by Apostle Paul to the Gentile nations, including the Philippines, for the fullness of all, as mentioned in Ephesians 1:22-23:

> "And God placed all things under His feet and appointed Him to be head over everything for the church, which is His body, the fullness of Him who fills everything in every way."

Christ is recognized as the Head of the Church, the Body of Christ, as stated in Colossians 1:18:

> "And He is the head of the body, the church; He is the beginning and the firstborn from among the dead, so that in everything He might have the supremacy."

Moreover, He is the Savior of the body, which is the church, as indicated in Ephesians 5:22-23:

> "Wives, submit yourselves to your own husbands as you do to the Lord. For the husband is the head of the wife as Christ is the head of the church, His body, of which He is the Savior."

This belief constitutes the new and living way mentioned in Hebrews 10:19-20:

> "Therefore, brothers and sisters, since we have confidence to enter the Most Holy Place by the blood of Jesus, by a new and living way opened for us through the curtain, that is, His body."

Thus, the name "Church Body of Christ Filipinista" not only reflects its foundational biblical principles but also honors the inclusion and unity of Filipino Gentiles in the fulfillment of Christ's promises, marking their significant place in the divine plan of salvation and eternal glory.

== History of the Church ==
The Church Body of Christ – Filipinista traces its origins to the Iglesia Filipina Independiente (IFI), also known as the Philippine Independent Church. This denomination was initially led by Monseigneur Gregorio Aglipay, D.D, the first Obispo Maximo of the Church. Following Msgr. Aglipay's death, the Church experienced a schism, resulting in two factions.

The first faction was led by Msgr. Santiago Fonacier, who established the Independent Church of Filipino Christians (ICFC). The second faction remained under the leadership of Msgr. Isabelo de los Reyes Jr., continuing as the mainline Philippine Independent Church (PIC).

During this period of division, the Bishop of Western Mindanao, Msgr. Lucilo G. Miñoza, D.D, affiliated with Msgr. Santiago Fonacier's faction, embarked on an intensive study of the Holy Scriptures. He undertook months of fasting, seeking divine guidance regarding the true Church. Through a vision, the Lord revealed to him the one true Church, which is His Body. Msgr. Miñoza subsequently made this revelation known to the Filipino people, naming it the Church Body of Christ - Filipinista, signifying its Philippine origins.

The Church experienced rapid growth, establishing numerous chapels and parishes, and converting many Filipinos. Furthermore, it inspired many young men to pursue priesthood through its Biblical doctrines.

=== Bishop Lucilo G. Miñoza ===
Msgr. Lucilo G. Miñoza, D.D., born on October 28, was the organizer and first Supreme Bishop of the Church Body of Christ Filipinista. He dedicated his life to spreading the will of God to all believers in Jesus Christ. On March 17, 1966, he officially registered the Church with the Securities and Exchange Commission in Pagadian City, Philippines, securing its legal recognition.

Upon his death, Msgr. Miñoza was succeeded by his son, Msgr. Silverio Miñoza, who continued to advance and reform the Church. Msgr. Silverio served two terms, totaling twelve years, before dying due to an unknown illness. He was succeeded by his brother, Rizaldo Miñoza, who held office for only six months before dying from a peptic ulcer. The leadership then passed to their younger brother, Msgr. Manuel Miñoza.

=== Division of the Church ===
In the year 2000, Msgr. Manuel Miñoza succeeded to the office with an expected term ending in 2006. However, during his tenure, a conspiracy arose involving his loyal followers. They amended Article V of the Church's constitution, which originally mandated an election every six years, to extend Msgr. Miñoza's term to a lifetime tenure.

This amendment led to a significant division within the Church, resulting in the formation of two factions. One faction, led by Msgr. Manuel Miñoza, administered the Church Body of Christ" World Mission". The other faction, under the leadership of Bishop Edgardo F. Betita, continued to operate the old Church Body of Christ-Filipinista. Bishop Betita's faction adhered to the by-laws established during the Convention of the Council of Bishops.

== New administration and present day CBCF ==
In 2007, Msgr. Edgardo F. Betita, serving as the General Secretary and Vicar Bishop of the Church, called for an immediate election of Church officials. This election resulted in the appointment of Msgr. David G. Sebial Sr. as the new primate of the Church.

The installation of the new primate sparked debate and division among Church members, particularly those loyal to the Primate, Msgr. Manuel Miñoza. They questioned whether the Church Body of Christ-Filipinista (C.B.C.F.) or the Church Body of Christ (World Mission) was the true Church organized by the late Msgr. Lucilo Miñoza.

In response, significant efforts were made to reaffirm to the members that the Church Body of Christ-Filipinista remained the authentic Church established by the late Msgr. Lucilo Miñoza, who had received divine revelation identifying it as the true Church. Over the years, the Church Body of Christ-Filipinista has continued to stand firm as a Church of God, supported and cherished by Filipino Christians.

=== Doctrine and Beliefs ===
Central to the faith of the Church Body of Christ Filipinista is its adherence to the teachings of Jesus Christ and the apostles as found in the Holy Bible. The church holds that its doctrinal framework is solely derived from Scripture, seeking to preserve and propagate the fundamental teachings of Christianity as practiced by the early church communities.

=== Worship practices ===
In line with its commitment to early Christian traditions, worship within the Church Body of Christ Filipinista is characterized by its Ad orientem orientation during Holy Mass. This practice reflects a historical continuity with early Christian liturgical practices where the priest and congregation face eastward together, symbolizing their focus on God's heavenly kingdom and the rising sun of Christ. This approach underscores the church's reverence for the sacred and its dedication to maintaining a connection with the roots of Christian worship.

Additionally, the church celebrates the Eucharist according to the Latin rite form, using its own version of the Filipinista Missal in vernacular languages derived from Spanish, preserving both the essence of traditional liturgy and the cultural heritage of the Filipino people.

=== Social Justice and Spiritual Development ===
Beyond its emphasis on traditional worship and doctrinal fidelity, the Church Body of Christ Filipinista places a strong emphasis on the spiritual growth and social justice advocacy of its members. The church actively engages in community outreach and initiatives aimed at promoting equity and compassion in society.

=== Leadership structure ===
The governance of the Church Body of Christ Filipinista is organized under a hierarchical structure, led by various bishops who oversee different aspects of church administration and ministry. Every six years, the church elects its leader through an election during an assembly of clergy, who is then proclaimed as the Supreme Executive Bishop. The Supreme Executive Bishop governs the entire Church Body of Christ Filipinista and appoints members of the Supreme Council of Bishops. This structure ensures effective leadership and facilitates the implementation of the church's mission to nurture spiritual development and uphold Christian principles in contemporary contexts.

== Ecumenical relations of the Church Body of Christ Filipinista ==
The Church Body of Christ Filipinista is a Christian denomination based in the Philippines, known for its distinct theological and ecclesiastical framework. Established with a focus on cultural relevance and community outreach, the church has developed its identity within the broader Christian landscape while maintaining unique doctrinal perspectives.

== Ecumenical engagement ==
The Church Body of Christ Filipinista participates in ecumenical dialogues and cooperative efforts with various Christian denominations and organizations. While maintaining theological distinctiveness, the church seeks avenues for collaboration on social issues, community service projects, and interfaith dialogue.

The ecumenical relations of the Church Body of Christ Filipinista reflect its dual commitment to theological integrity and cooperative engagement within the wider Christian community. While maintaining independence in doctrinal matters, the church actively seeks opportunities for joint efforts and mutual understanding with other Christian traditions.

== Non-communion status ==
Despite engaging in ecumenical discussions, the Church Body of Christ Filipinista is not in formal communion with many other Christian churches. This status reflects its theological positions on sacraments, ecclesiastical authority, and doctrinal interpretations, which differ from those of other denominations.
