= Tubajon =

Municipality in Dinagat Islands, Philippines

- Municipality
- Municipality of Tubajon
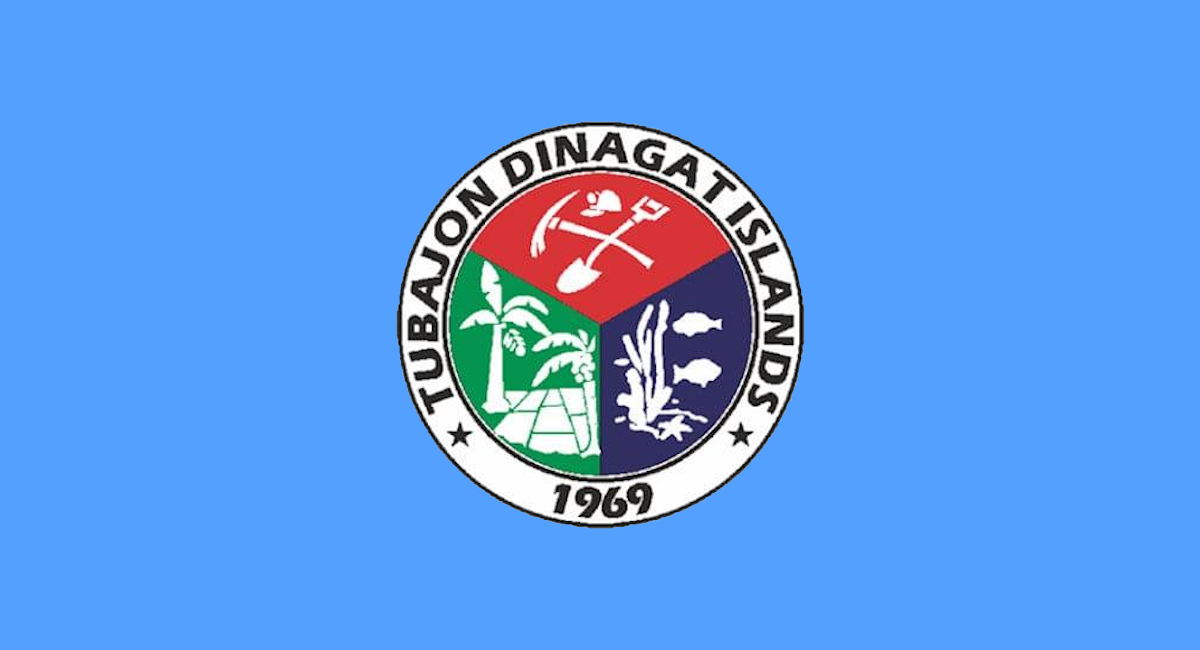
- Flag

- Map of Dinagat Islands with Tubajon highlighted
- Interactive map of Tubajon
- Location within the Philippines
- Coordinates: 10°19′31″N 125°33′26″E
- Country: Philippines
- Region: Caraga
- Province: Dinagat Islands
- District: Lone district
- Founded: June 21, 1969
- Barangays: 9 (see Barangays)

Government
  - Type: Sangguniang Bayan
  - Mayor: Simplicia P. Pedrablanca
  - Vice Mayor: Marvin M. Lasco
  - Representative: Alan 1 B. Ecleo
  - Municipal Council: Members: Samson A. Tidalgo; Jorvie B. Agbo; Oscar B. Navidas; Wilfredo L. Punay; Novo M. Magallanes; Revic T. Jarabe; Pastor B. Olaco; Helen B. Daytoc
  - Electorate: 6,910 voters (2025)

Area
  - Total: 90.00 km^{2} (34.75 sq mi)
- Elevation: 55 m (180 ft)
- Highest elevation: 406 m (1,332 ft)
- Lowest elevation: 0 m (0 ft)

Population (2024 census)
  - Total: 8,964
  - Density: 99.60/km^{2} (258.0/sq mi)
  - Households: 1,971

Economy
  - Income class: 4th municipal income class
  - Poverty incidence: 31.09% (2023)
  - Revenue: ₱ 122.4 million (2024)
  - Assets: ₱ 27.97 million (2024)
  - Expenditure: ₱ 42.62 million (2024)
  - Liabilities: ₱ 31.2 million (2024)

Service provider
  - Electricity: Dinagat Island Electric Cooperative (DIELCO)
- Time zone: UTC+8 (PST)
- ZIP code: 8426
- PSGC: 1608507000
- IDD : area code: +63 (0)86
- Native languages: Surigaonon; Cebuano; Tagalog
- Website: www.tubajon.gov.ph

Tubajon, officially the Municipality of Tubajon (Cebuano: Lungsod sa Tubajon; Surigaonon: Lungsod nan Tubajon; Tagalog: Bayan ng Tubajon; Waray: Bungto han Tubajon), is a municipality in the province of Dinagat Islands, Philippines. According to the 2024 census, it has a population of 8,964 people, making it the least populated municipality in the province.

== History ==
Tubajon, which was once a barangay of Loreto, became a municipality on June 21, 1969, under Republic Act No. 5643. According to local folklore, during the Spanish regime, a banca boarded with Guardia Civils landed in the shores of Tubajon in search of a criminal. One of them came across a river and saw a man pounding leaves. Curious, he asked the man, "What will you do with it?" The man answered "Akong Tubajon ang suba aron sayon dakpon ang mga isda" (I will poison the river with Tuba leaves so that the fishes could be easily caught). When the man returned to the group, he narrated everything he saw and heard from the native to his companions. From then on, the place was called Tubajon.

The town became a part of the province of Dinagat Islands in December 2006, when the province was created from Surigao del Norte by Republic Act No. 9355. However, in February 2010, the Supreme Court ruled that the law was unconstitutional, as the necessary requirements for provincial land area and population were not met. The town reverted to Surigao del Norte. On October 24, 2012, however, the Supreme Court reversed its ruling, and upheld the constitutionality of RA 9355 and the creation of Dinagat Islands as a province.

== Geography ==
=== Barangays ===
Tubajon is politically subdivided into 9 barangays. Each barangay consists of puroks while some have sitios.

- Diaz
- Imelda
- Mabini
- Malinao
- Navarro
- Roxas
- San Roque (Poblacion)
- San Vicente (Poblacion)
- Santa Cruz (Poblacion)

=== Climate ===
Climate data for Tubajon, Dinagat Islands
Month	Jan	Feb	Mar	Apr	May	Jun	Jul	Aug	Sep	Oct	Nov	Dec	Year
Mean daily maximum °C (°F)	27 (81)	27 (81)	28 (82)	29 (84)	29 (84)	29 (84)	29 (84)	29 (84)	29 (84)	29 (84)	28 (82)	27 (81)	28 (83)
Mean daily minimum °C (°F)	22 (72)	22 (72)	22 (72)	23 (73)	24 (75)	24 (75)	24 (75)	24 (75)	24 (75)	24 (75)	24 (75)	23 (73)	23 (74)
Average precipitation mm (inches)	210 (8.3)	161 (6.3)	123 (4.8)	85 (3.3)	148 (5.8)	186 (7.3)	164 (6.5)	157 (6.2)	141 (5.6)	190 (7.5)	223 (8.8)	200 (7.9)	1,988 (78.3)
Average rainy days	21.0	16.8	18.5	18.2	24.9	27.7	28.4	27.0	26.1	27.6	24.6	22.0	282.8
Source: Meteoblue

== Demographics ==
Population census of Tubajon
Year	Pop.	±% p.a.
1970	3,660	—
1975	3,685	+0.14%
1980	4,461	+3.89%
1990	5,783	+2.63%
1995	6,155	+1.17%
2000	6,800	+2.16%
2007	7,815	+1.94%
2010	7,568	−1.16%
2015	8,276	+1.72%
2020	8,119	−0.40%
2024	8,964	+2.41%
Source: Philippine Statistics Authority

== Economy ==
Poverty incidence of Tubajon (%)

Source: Philippine Statistics Authority
