= Dinagat Islands =

Dinagat Islands Mga Islang Dinagat (Filipino)
- Province
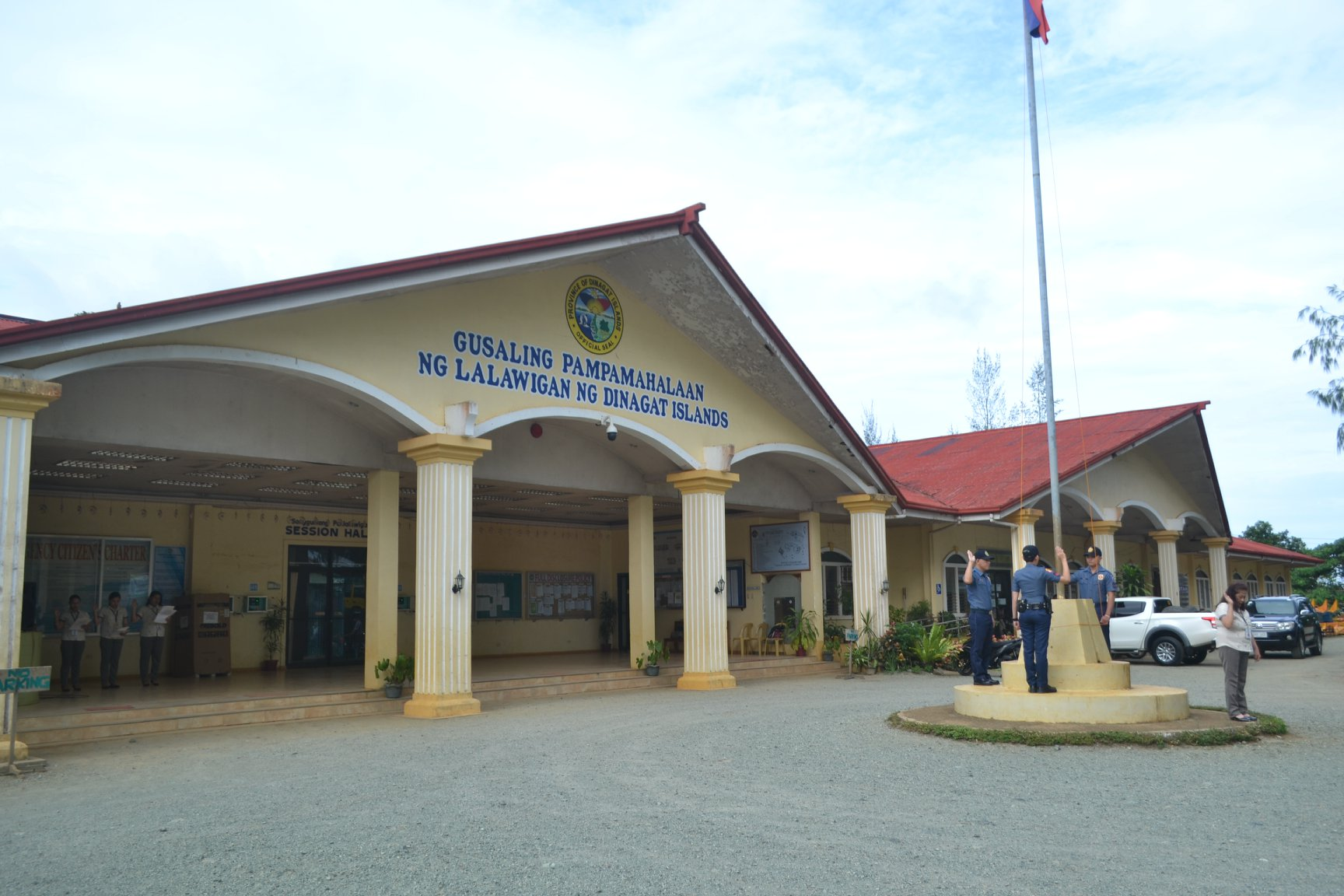
- Dinagat Provincial capitol in San Jose

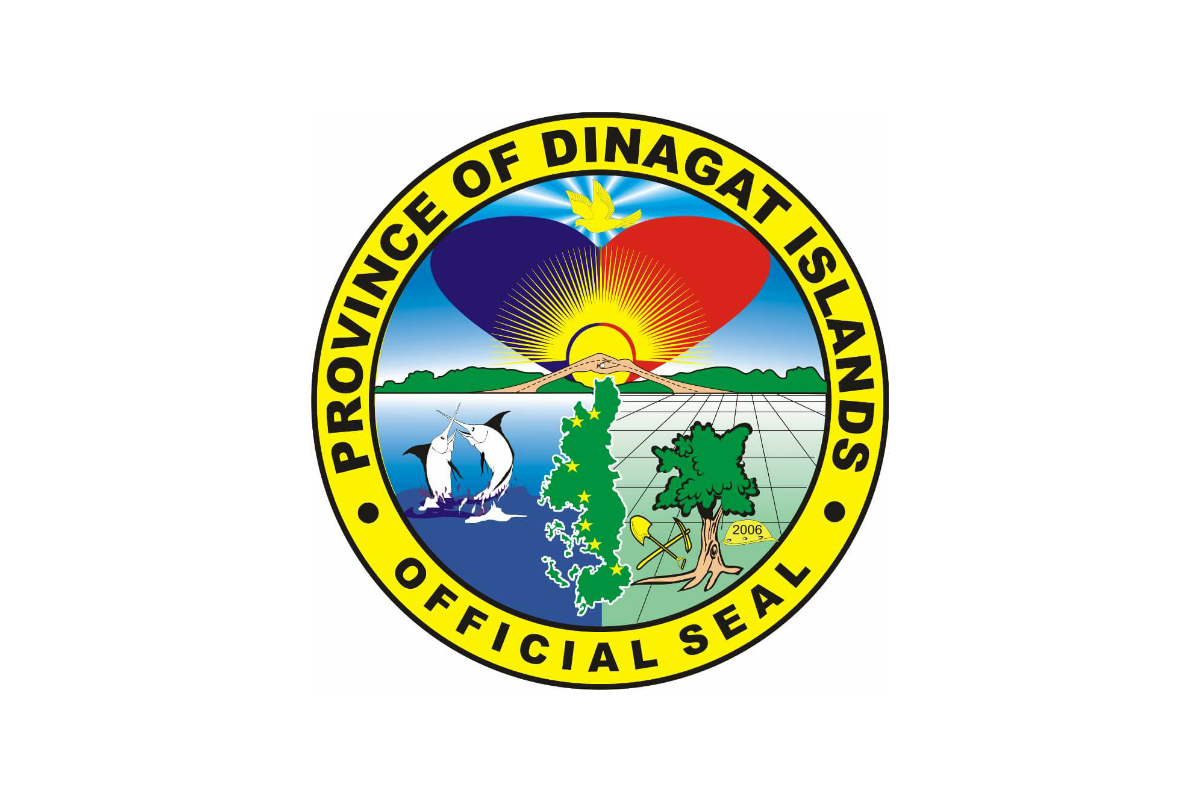
- Flag Seal
- Nickname: Mystical Island Province of Love
- Location in the Philippines
- Interactive map of Dinagat Islands
- Coordinates: 10°06′N 125°36′E
- Country: Philippines
- Region: Caraga
- Founded: 2 December 2006
- Capital: San Jose
- Largest Municipality: Basilisa

Government
  - Governor: Nilo P. Demerey Jr. (PFP)
  - Vice Governor: Geraldine B. Ecleo (PFP)
  - Representative: Arlene J. Bag-ao (LP)
  - Legislature: Dinagat Islands Provincial Board
  - Electorate: 81,673 voters (2025)

Area
  - Total: 1,036.34 km^{2} (400.13 sq mi)
  - Rank: 75th out of 82
- Highest elevation (Mount Redondo): 939 m (3,081 ft)

Population (2024 census)
  - Total: 120,533
  - Rank: 77th out of 82
  - Density: 116.306/km^{2} (301.232/sq mi)
  - Rank: 65th out of 82
  - Households: 29,391
- Demonym: Dinagatnon

Divisions
  - Independent cities: 0
  - Component cities: 0
  - Municipalities: 7: Basilisa; Cagdianao; Dinagat; Libjo; Loreto; San Jose; Tubajon
  - Barangays: 100
  - Districts: Legislative district of Dinagat Islands

Economy
  - Income class: 2nd provincial income class
  - Poverty incidence: 23.1% (2023)
  - Revenue: ₱ 1,078 million (2024)
  - Assets: ₱ 2,287 million (2024)
  - Expenditure: ₱ 481.6 million (2024)
  - Liabilities: ₱ 339.1 million (2024)
- Time zone: UTC+8 (PHT)
- PSGC: 168500000
- IDD : area code: +63 (0)86
- ISO 3166 code: PH-DIN
- Spoken languages: Cebuano; Surigaonon; Waray; Tagalog
- Website: dinagatislands.gov.ph

Dinagat Islands (Cebuano: Mga Pulo sa Dinagat; Surigaonon: Mga Puyo nan Dinagat; Kabalian: Mga Puyo san Dinagat; Waray: Mga Purô han Dinagat; Filipino: Mga Islang Dinagat), officially the Province of Dinagat Islands, is an island province in the Caraga region of the Philippines, located on the south side of Leyte Gulf. The island of Leyte is to its west, across Surigao Strait, and mainland Mindanao is to its south. Its main island, Dinagat, is about 60 kilometres (37 mi) from north to south. San Jose serves as its provincial capital while Basilisa is the most populous town in the province.

== Etymology ==
The name of the island means "of the sea" or "like the sea", an affixed from of the root word dagat ("sea") in the Visayan languages.

== History ==
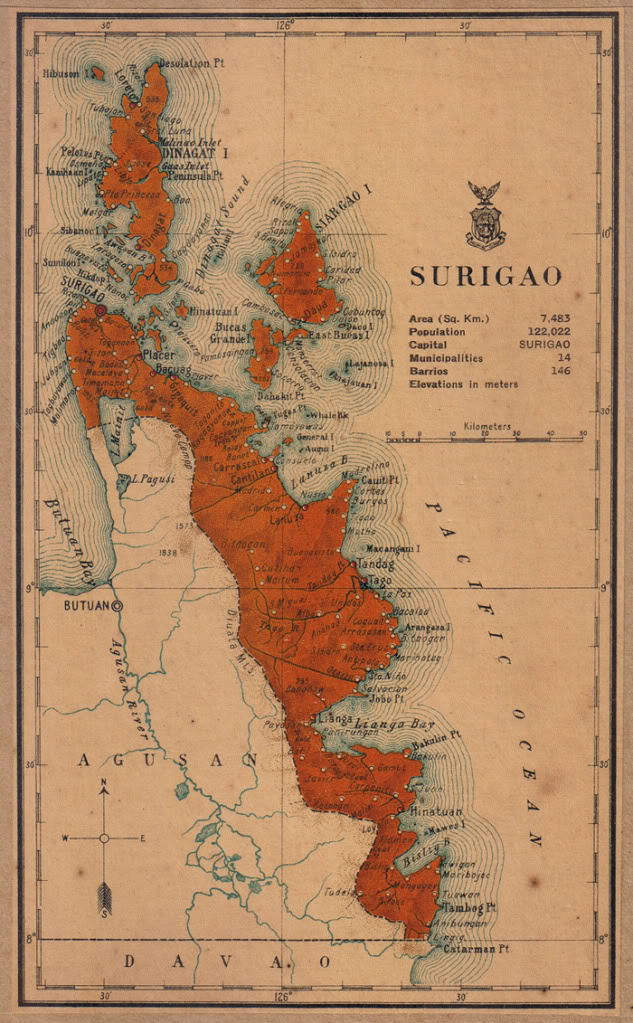
Surigao province map in 1918

=== Early history ===
The province in pre-colonial times was much influenced by the Rajahnate of Butuan which was nestled in present-day Agusan del Norte. It was also used as the entry point of the Sultanate of Ternate, present-day Moluccas of Indonesia, to attack the Rajahnate of Butuan, Rajahnate of Cebu, the indigenous settlements in the Anda Peninsula of Bohol, and the Kingdom of Dapitan (located 'between' Panglao and Bohol), which later moved into northern Zamboanga, in another settlement also named Dapitan, after the original Kingdom of Dapitan was destroyed.

=== Spanish colonial era ===
Although one of the newest provinces of the country, settlements in the Dinagat Islands were already present during the Spanish regime as a result of migration of people from nearby provinces of Bohol and Leyte. In particular during World War II, the allegedly magical province had a significant impact on the history of the nation.

The municipality was formally established in 1855. It occupies the territorial boundaries of the whole island. From 1890 to 1990 its boundaries were gradually reduced giving rise to seven municipalities, Dinagat (Mother Municipality), Loreto, Cagdianao, Libjo, Basilisa, Tubajon, and San Jose.

Loreto became a Spanish pueblo on September 4, 1890, under the supervision of Governor General Manuel Sanchez by the virtue of Direccion General No. 30. It was originally called Mabua due to the ever-foaming river that runs right into the center of the community. It was named Loreto in 1881 by the Spanish priest who frequents the town, in honor of the wife of the Alcalde Mayor of the province of Surigao.

=== Japanese occupation ===
The province was the site of the historic Battle of Surigao Strait during the Second World War. The Municipality of Loreto became the entry point of the American Liberation Forces on October 17, 1944. It was on this shore that the 6th Ranger Battalion of the 6th U.S. Army under Col. Mucci landed at Sitio Campintac of Barangay Panamaon in Loreto. It was during this landing that the first American flag flew on Philippine soil since the Japanese invasion in 1941. The Americans named the place "Black Beach No. 2."

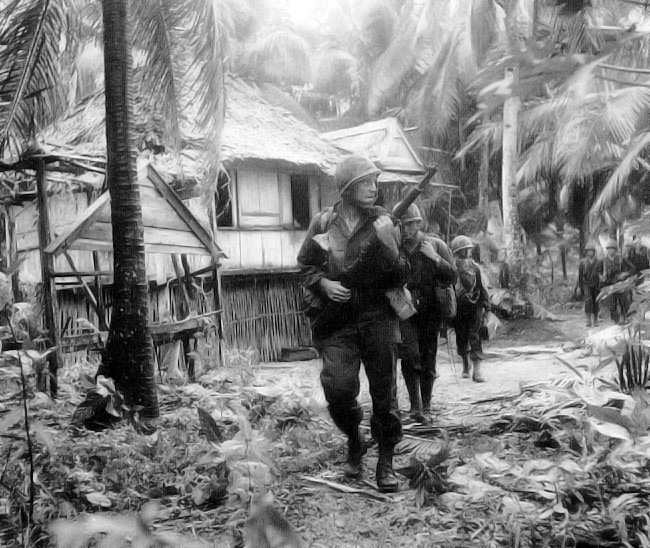
Soldiers of the 6th Ranger Battalion move through a village on Dinagat Island, 18 October 1944.

The northern part of the island served as a refuge for the American soldiers, while the western border was held by Japanese forces. Capsized vessel structures are still found today in the waters of Basilisa.

=== Local history ===
Being the oldest town, Dinagat is the "mother" municipality of the province of Dinagat Islands. Dinagat was then a part of the province of Surigao Del Norte. Dinagat was founded under the order of Governor-General Manuel Crespo as a pueblo on April 25, 1855. Settlers from Leyte, Bohol, and Surigao built their homes along the coast of what is now Dinagat's poblacion. The first families to settle in the town were Ga, Ventura, Ecunar, Gealogo, Jarligo, Geraldino, Ensomo, Gier, and Eviota. The pueblo was in constant risk of being attacked by Moro pirates from mainland Mindanao. They even managed to steal the bell of the Immaculada Concepcion Parish, the only church in the town then, and dumped it in a well in now Sitio Busay in Barangay New Mabuhay. The pillaging was eventually stopped by the first gobernadorcillo of the town, Pedro Ga Ventura and his brother Leon. They are considered by local historians as the first heroes of the province.

In 1879, Barangay Mabua of Dinagat was occasionally visited by the Parish Priest then assigned to Dinagat. Mabua was divided into six sections or barrios, but was still under the jurisdiction of Dinagat. By 1881, the name Mabua was changed to Loreto, the name was given by the Spanish Priest in honor of Loreto, the wife of the Alcalde Mayor of the province of Surigao. On September 4, 1890, the Governor General Manuel Sanches issued Direccion General No. 30 which created Loreto as the second Spanish Pueblo in Dinagat Island. On December 20, 1918, Governor General Francis Burton Harrison issued Executive Order No. 60 creating the Municipality of Loreto in the province of Surigao

On December 23, 1959, Cagdianao was created into a municipality under Executive Order No. 367. Its name came from the Spanish word Cada dia linao meaning "everyday peaceful and calm". However, some scholars say that its name came from the Visayan word Taga Danaw meaning "the lake people".

On December 2, 1959, the two Municipal Councils of Dinagat and Loreto held a joint session at Barrio Libjo. They unanimously approved Resolution No. 5, series of 1959, creating the Municipality of Albor in the Province of Surigao. It was agreed by the two councils that Loreto and Dinagat will contribute portions of their territories to comprise the new municipality. The northern portion of the municipality was part of Loreto, namely, Barrio Quezon, Libjo, Bolodbolod and San Jose. The southern portion that included Barrio Osmeña, Cahayag, Arellano and Plaridel were part of the Municipality of Dinagat.

Albor became a Municipality on February 29, 1960, by virtue of Executive Order No. 381 issued by President Carlos P. Garcia. The name “Albor” is a portmanteau of the two surnames of Mayor Moises Alfaro of Loreto and Mayor Prospero Borja of Dinagat. The first Municipal Mayor to govern Albor was Lamberto Llamera Sr. It was renamed as Libjo on June 17, 1967. The name came from the word Libo-o, a kind of mussel clam.

Basilisa became a municipality on June 17, 1967, under Republic Act No. 4986. It was then named as Rizal, after the country's national hero. The municipality was renamed as Basilisa on June 21, 1969, under Republic Act. No. 5775.

In 1966, there was a joint session made by the Municipal Council of Loreto and Barangay Council of Tubajon, creating Barrio Tubajon as a Municipality. Upon the recommendation of the Provincial Board of Surigao, Tubajon was created as a Municipality under Republic Act No. 5643 on June 21, 1969. The Barrios of San Vicente, Sta. Cruz, Roxas, Mabini, Malinao, Navarro and Emelda were separated from the Municipality of Loreto and transferred to the Municipality of Tubajon. The first Municipal Mayor was Jacinto S. Pinat Sr.

Dinagat island experienced a population boom shortly after the foundation of the Philippine Benevolent Missionaries Association (PBMA) in 1965. The new PBMA members settled in Sitio Puyangi, which later grew to become Barangay San Jose. Barangay San Jose would eventually become the Municipality of San Jose on November 15, 1989, under Republic Act No. 6769. The town was named in honor of Jose Ecleo, the father of Ruben Ecleo Sr, the leader of PBMA.

The Dinagat Islands was part of the First District of Surigao del Norte Province until it became a province on December 2, 2006, with the approval of Republic Act No. 9355, the Charter of the province of the Dinagat Islands, in a plebiscite. President Gloria Macapagal Arroyo appointed the province's first set of officials on January 26, 2007. Provincial officials were first elected a few months later, in the May 14, 2007 elections. These elected officials took office on July 1, 2007.

On February 11, 2010, the Supreme Court of the Philippines declared the creation of the Dinagat Islands Province null and void because the land area and population requirements for the creation of local government units was not met. The decision was not finalized before the May 10, 2010 elections; therefore the Commission on Elections still organized the elections for the province's separate congressional representative and provincial officials. Although the original decision was made final and executory on May 18, 2010, reverting Dinagat Islands back to Surigao del Norte, the officials elected in 2010 continued to serve the province until the Supreme Court reversed its ruling in 2011.

On April 12, 2011, the Supreme Court reversed its earlier ruling, upholding the constitutionality of Republic Act No. 9355 and validating the creation of Dinagat Islands as a province. An Entry of Judgment on October 24, 2012, ended the legal battles surrounding the status of the province, and finalized the separation of Dinagat Islands from Surigao del Norte.

== Geography ==
The province is one of the smallest island provinces in the country with a total land area of 1,036.34 square kilometres (400.13 sq mi). Located to the northeast of Surigao del Norte, in mainland Mindanao, the Dinagat Islands are separated physically from Awasan and Nonoc Islands of Surigao del Norte by the narrow, 15 kilometres (9.3 mi) long, Gaboc Channel. It takes about 75 minutes to cross from Surigao City Port to San Jose Port by pump boat.

The province consists of the eponymous Dinagat Island and surrounding islands and islets, including Cabilan Island in Dinagat, La Isla Aga and Lalaking Bukid in Basilisa, Kisses Islets in Libjo and Hibuson, Stingray Islet and Puyo Islet in Loreto.

Mount Redondo on Dinagat Island is the highest point of the province reaching 939 metres (3,081 ft) above sea level.

=== Climate change ===
The Dinagat Islands province is among the top 20 most vulnerable provinces to climate change in the Philippines.

=== Administrative divisions ===
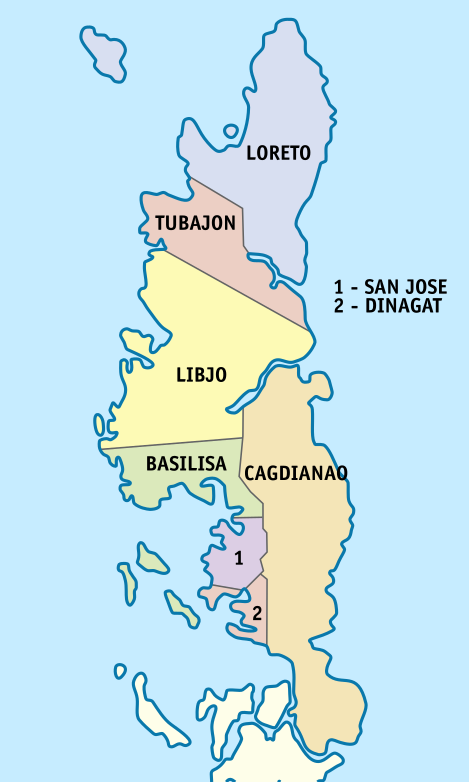
Political divisions

The Dinagat Islands province comprises seven municipalities, all encompassed by a single legislative district.

Municipality (Note: The globe icon marks the town center.)		Population			±% p.a.	Area		Density		Barangay
		(2020)		(2015)		km^{2}	sq mi	/km^{2}	/sq mi	
Basilisa		28.8%	36,911	36,880	+0.02%	92.68	35.78	400	1,000	27
Cagdianao		14.3%	18,350	16,808	+1.69%	249.48	96.32	74	190	14
Dinagat		8.3%	10,621	10,632	−0.02%	139.94	54.03	76	200	12
Libjo		14.1%	18,051	17,760	+0.31%	180.57	69.72	100	260	16
Loreto		7.6%	9,690	9,309	+0.77%	255.87	98.79	38	98	10
San Jose	†	20.6%	26,375	27,487	−0.78%	27.80	10.73	950	2,500	12
Tubajon		6.3%	8,119	8,276	−0.36%	90.00	34.75	90	230	9
Total			128,117	127,152	+0.14%	1,036.34	400.13	120	310	100
	† Provincial capital					Municipality				

== Demographics ==
Population census of Dinagat Islands

Year	Pop.	±% p.a.
1903	5,243	—
1918	8,382	+3.18%
1939	16,156	+3.17%
1948	17,317	+0.77%
1960	22,761	+2.30%
1970	32,227	+3.53%

Year	Pop.	±% p.a.
1975	53,443	+10.68%
1980	79,342	+8.22%
1990	98,865	+2.22%
1995	100,537	+0.31%
2000	106,951	+1.33%
2007	120,813	+1.70%

Year	Pop.	±% p.a.
2010	126,803	+1.78%
2015	127,152	+0.05%
2020	128,117	+0.16%
2024	120,533	−1.45%

Source: Philippine Statistics Authority

The population of the Dinagat Islands in the 2024 census was 120,533 people, with a density of 120 inhabitants per square kilometre or 310 inhabitants per square mile.

The original inhabitants of the province are called "Lumad", while residents of the Dinagat Islands are called "Dinagatnon". The Dinagat Islands is predominantly a Cebuano-speaking province. However, towns facing the Surigao del Norte maritime border are Surigaonon-speaking, particularly the municipalities of Dinagat and Cagdianao due to their proximity to the province of Surigao del Norte. Barangay Panamaon and the historic Hibuson Island in Loreto speak Waray-Waray. Influences of the Cebuano and Boholano languages with a Tausug accent can be traced. Most can also speak various levels of Tagalog

=== Religion ===
Several religious conflicts were recorded in the province. But at present, religious harmony is relatively observed in most parts of Dinagat Island.

=== Catholicism ===
Religious breakdown in the province shows Catholicism at majority with 53% adherence while Iglesia Filipina Independiente or Aglipayan is the significant minority religion at 23%. Recent cultural, religious and socioeconomic changes of the province have allowed the rebound of Catholics (and Aglipayans in some degree) and their numbers have constantly increased; the province had experienced a Catholic decline in several decades (1970s-early 2000s) due to immigration of the members of Philippine Benevolent Missionaries Association in the 1960s. There were some decades (1990s-2000s) where Catholics became minority with as low as 37% of the population.

=== Others ===
Other religions are the Church Body of Christ- Filipinistas (12%), United Church of Christ in the Philippines (4%), Iglesia ni Cristo (4%) and other smaller Christian groups (Dinagat Island Socio Economic Factbook, 2007).

== Government ==
The Governor of the Dinagat Islands is the local chief executive of the province of the Dinagat Islands.

No.	Name	Image	Took office	Left office	Party
1		Geraldine B. Ecleo-Villaroman	July 1, 2007	June 30, 2010	Lakas
2		Glenda B. Ecleo	June 30, 2010	June 30, 2019	Lakas–Kampi
2		Glenda B. Ecleo	June 30, 2010	June 30, 2019	Nacionalista
2		Glenda B. Ecleo	June 30, 2010	June 30, 2019	UNA
3		Arlene J. Bag-ao	June 30, 2019	June 30, 2022	Liberal
4		Nilo P. Demerey Jr.	June 30, 2022		PFP

Current Provincial Government Officials (2025-2028)

- Governor: Nilo P. Demerey Jr. (PFP)
- Vice-Governor: Geraldine B. Ecleo (PFP)

Sangguniang Panlalawigan Members

1st District

- Ali P. Adlawan (Lakas)
- Carlos P. Bua (PFP)
- Nilo Marco M. Demerey (PFP)
- Anna Leyn C. Diale (Akbayan)
- Zacarias N. Vales (Lakas)
- Ronald O. Luid Sr. (Lakas)

2nd District

- Errol Conrad B. Dela Cruz (Independent)
- Jaypee T. Esperas (Lakas)
- Leolexes B. Durano (PFP)
- Alexis B. Tugay (Lakas)

Ex-Officio Members

- TBD (President, Liga ng mga Barangay)
- TBD (President, PCL)
- TBD (President, Panlalawigang Pederasyon ng Sangguniang Kabataan)

=== District representatives ===
District	Representative	Party	Term	Bloc
Lone	Arlene "Kaka" J. Bag-ao	Liberal	1	Minority

== Economy ==
Poverty incidence of Dinagat Islands (%)

Source: Philippine Statistics Authority

The economy of the Dinagat Islands relies on nickel mining alongside agriculture and fishing. Only 41 percent of the total land area is suitable for farming due to highly mineralized and rocky terrain. Farmers cultivate rice, corn, and bananas primarily in the plains adjacent to creeks and rivers. Fishing operations provide employment across coastal and deep sea areas. The Philippine Statistics Authority reported a provincial Gross Domestic Product of 13.84 billion pesos for the year 2024. Industry accounted for 53.2 percent of the economic structure during that same period. Services contributed 41.5 percent to the local economy in 2024. Agriculture and forestry along with fishing represented 5.3 percent of the gross provincial output. The Bureau of Fisheries and Aquatic Resources provides technical training and equipment to local fishers to improve income stability.

== Tourism ==
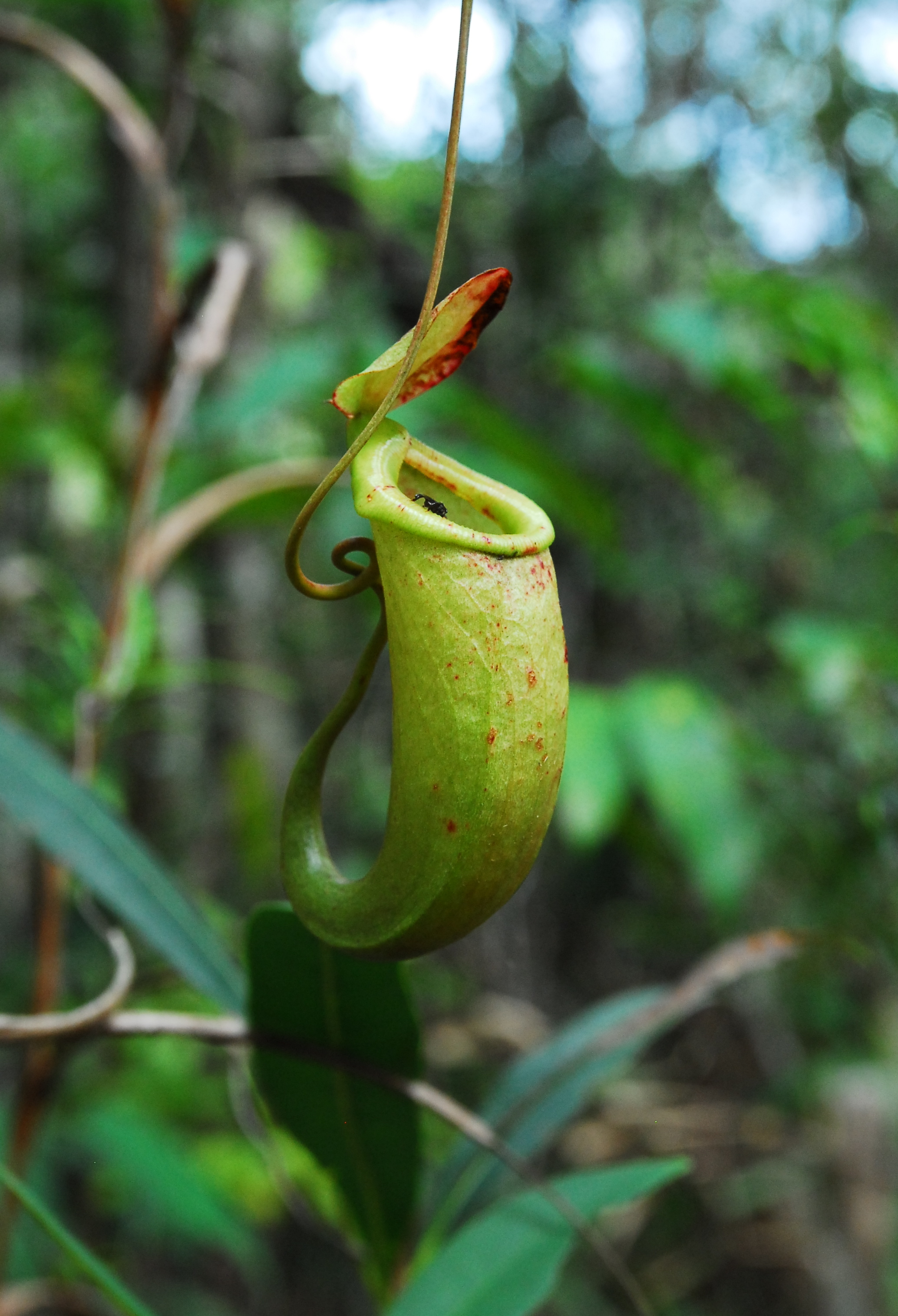
Nepenthes bellii, a tropical pitcher plant endemic to the Philippine islands of Mindanao and Dinagat, where it grows at elevations of 0–800 m above sea level

Dinagat Islands is a young island-province at the northern tip of Mindanao. Many describe Dinagat Islands as a hidden gem of the Caraga Region XIII. The Islands are enriched with great bio-diversity, abundant natural wonders and rich resources. Dinagat Islands has a multitude of fascinating white sandy beaches with arrays of colossal rock formations. These sites and attractions are as diverse as the topography of the islands and islets.

The province is known for its caves, resorts, and beaches. These include Bitaug Beach, Campintac Black Beach No. 2, Linao Spring Resort, and San Juan Cave (all in Loreto), Lake Bababu, Puerto Prinsesa Beach & Hagakhak Cave in Basilisa, Tagberayan Beach, Sayaw Beach, Legaspi Water Falls, Hinabyan and Leandro's Beach Resort in Cagdianao, Talisay Beach in Tubajon, Quano Blue Lagoon and Quano Cave, Ben Paz Mountain Resort and Oasis Islet Resort in Libjo, and the Cab-ilan Beach & Cab-ilan Gamay Beach in Dinagat.

The provincial People's Hall building, built in 2024, was inspired by the Japanese Yamato-class battleship during the Battle of Surigao Strait in World War II.

== Environment and wildlife ==
The Dinagat Islands is one of the most environmentally significant provinces in the Philippines, where endemism of fauna is unique in its region. Animals that are endemic to the province include the critically endangered Dinagat bushy-tailed cloud rat that was rediscovered in 2012 after decades of disappearance, the endangered Dinagat hairy-tailed rat, Dinagat gymnure that has been declared by the EDGE Species Programme of the Zoological Society of London as one of the top 100 most evolutionary distinct and globally endangered species in the world, and a strange sub-species of the Philippine tarsier that is unusually larger and darker in color than the common Philippine tarsier. The province is highly forested and is considered as a Key Biodiversity Area by Haribon Foundation and the Department of Environment and Natural Resources of the Philippines because of its unique fauna and flora, along with its lush rainforests that are classified as primary forests, or forests that have never been fully obliterated since pre-colonial times.

UPLB MNH Professor Edwino S. Fernando and Dr. Peter Gordon Wilson of the Australian Institute of Botanical Science, discovered 'Tristaniopsis flexuosa,' a Tristaniopsis new species found only in Mount Redondo, Dinagat Island. It has similarity with Tristaniopsis elliptica.
