= Basilisa =

Municipality in Dinagat Islands, Philippines

Basilisa Rizal
- Municipality
- Municipality of Basilisa
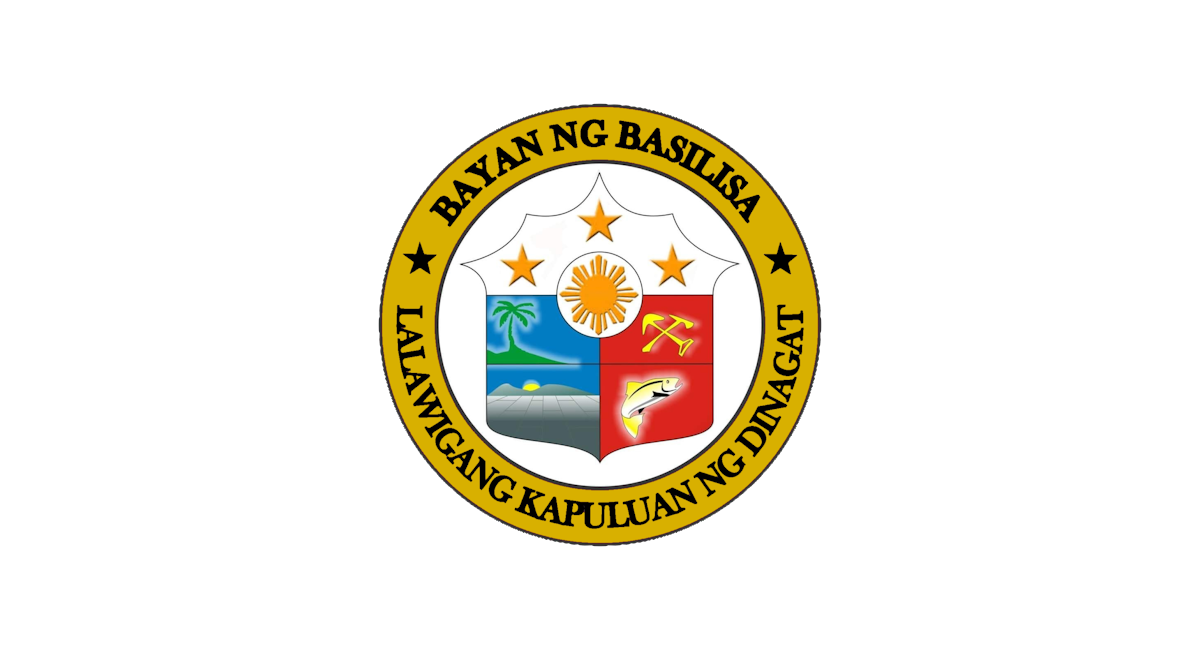
- Flag

- Map of Dinagat Islands with Basilisa highlighted
- Interactive map of Basilisa
- Location within the Philippines
- Coordinates: 10°03′56″N 125°35′49″E
- Country: Philippines
- Region: Caraga
- Province: Dinagat Islands
- District: Lone district
- Founded: June 17, 1967
- Named for: Basilisa Meso
- Barangays: 27 (see Barangays)

Government
  - Type: Sangguniang Bayan
  - Mayor: Ozzy Reuben M. Ecleo
  - Vice Mayor: Manuelito N. Piodo Jr.
  - Representative: Arlene J. Bag-ao
  - Municipal Council: Members: Juanito G. Piodo; Rex Angelo S. Diaz; Cinderella C. Roma; Cesar T. Borja III; Mark Anthony G. Aray; Jefferson I. Relator; Jeffrey C. Flores; Norlito R. Ticod
  - Electorate: 15,193 voters (2025)

Area
  - Total: 102.4587 km^{2} (39.5595 sq mi)
- Elevation: 4.0 m (13.1 ft)
- Highest elevation: 192 m (630 ft)
- Lowest elevation: 0 m (0 ft)

Population (2024 census)
  - Total: 27,238
  - Density: 265.84/km^{2} (688.53/sq mi)
  - Households: 7,060

Economy
  - Income class: 3rd municipal income class
  - Poverty incidence: 46.51% (2023)
  - Revenue: ₱ 169.1 million (2024)
  - Assets: ₱ 469.6 million (2024)
  - Expenditure: ₱ 158.9 million (2024)
  - Liabilities: ₱ 67.56 million (2024)

Service provider
  - Electricity: Dinagat Island Electric Cooperative (DIELCO)
- Time zone: UTC+8 (PST)
- ZIP code: 8413
- PSGC: 1608501000
- IDD : area code: +63 (0)86
- Native languages: Surigaonon; Cebuano; Tagalog
- Website: basilisadinagatislands.gov.ph

Basilisa, officially the Municipality of Basilisa (Surigaonon: Lungsod nan Basilisa; Cebuano: Lungsod sa Basilisa; Tagalog: Bayan ng Basilisa), is a municipality in the province of Dinagat Islands, Philippines. According to the 2024 census, it has a population of 27,238 people.

The municipality was created on June 17, 1967 by virtue of Republic Act No. 4986 and named it as Rizal. On June 21, 1969, the municipality was renamed as Basilisa by virtue of Republic Act No. 5775 in honor of the late former Mayor Basilisa Meso.

The town became a part of the province of Dinagat Islands in December 2006, when the province was created from Surigao del Norte by Republic Act No. 9355. However, in February 2010, the Supreme Court ruled that the law was unconstitutional, as the necessary requirements for provincial land area and population were not met. The town reverted to Surigao del Norte. On October 24, 2012, however, the Supreme Court reversed its ruling from the previous year, and upheld the constitutionality of RA 9355 and the creation of Dinagat Islands as a province.

== Geography ==
=== Barangays ===
Basilisa is politically subdivided into 27 barangays. Each barangay consists of puroks while some have sitios.

- Benglen
- Catadman (Kapakyan)
- Columbus
- Coring
- Cortes
- Diegas
- Doña Helene
- Edera
- Poblacion Ferdinand
- Geotina
- Imee (Bactasan)
- Melgar
- Montag
- Navarro
- New Nazareth
- Poblacion (Rizal)
- Puerto Princesa
- Rita Glenda
- Roma
- Roxas
- Santa Monica
- Tag-abaca
- Poblacion Santo Niño
- Sering
- Sombrado
- Villa Ecleo
- Villa Pantinople

=== Climate ===
Climate data for Basilisa, Dinagat Islands
Month	Jan	Feb	Mar	Apr	May	Jun	Jul	Aug	Sep	Oct	Nov	Dec	Year
Mean daily maximum °C (°F)	27 (81)	28 (82)	28 (82)	30 (86)	30 (86)	30 (86)	29 (84)	30 (86)	30 (86)	29 (84)	29 (84)	28 (82)	29 (84)
Mean daily minimum °C (°F)	23 (73)	23 (73)	23 (73)	23 (73)	25 (77)	25 (77)	25 (77)	25 (77)	25 (77)	25 (77)	24 (75)	24 (75)	24 (75)
Average precipitation mm (inches)	210 (8.3)	161 (6.3)	123 (4.8)	85 (3.3)	148 (5.8)	186 (7.3)	164 (6.5)	157 (6.2)	141 (5.6)	190 (7.5)	223 (8.8)	200 (7.9)	1,988 (78.3)
Average rainy days	21.0	16.8	18.5	18.2	24.9	27.7	28.4	27.0	26.1	27.6	24.6	22.0	282.8
Source: Meteoblue

== Demographics ==
Population census of Basilisa
Year	Pop.	±% p.a.
1970	5,047	—
1975	10,614	+16.08%
1980	13,900	+5.54%
1990	20,953	+4.19%
1995	24,141	+2.69%
2000	26,489	+2.01%
2007	31,363	+2.36%
2010	33,880	+2.85%
2015	36,880	+1.63%
2020	36,911	+0.02%
2024	27,238	−7.04%
Source: Philippine Statistics Authority

== Economy ==
Poverty incidence of Basilisa

Source: Philippine Statistics Authority
