= Gibusong =

Island in the Philippines

- Location within Philippines

Geography
- Location: Surigao Strait
- Coordinates: 10°26′30″N 125°28′57″E
- Archipelago: Dinagat Islands
- Adjacent to: Leyte Gulf; Surigao Strait

Administration
- Philippines
- Region: Caraga
- Province: Dinagat Islands
- Municipality: Loreto

Additional information

Gibusong, variously Hibusong and Hibuson, is a Waray-speaking island in Mindanao, Philippines, in the province of Dinagat Islands. It lies northwest of Dinagat Island, at the north end of Surigao Strait connecting with Leyte Gulf and is under the jurisdiction of the municipality of Loreto. The island, together with the smaller Little Gibusong Island, is administratively divided into three barangays: Liberty, Helene, and Magsaysay. A ferry route connects Liberty with the main port of Loreto.

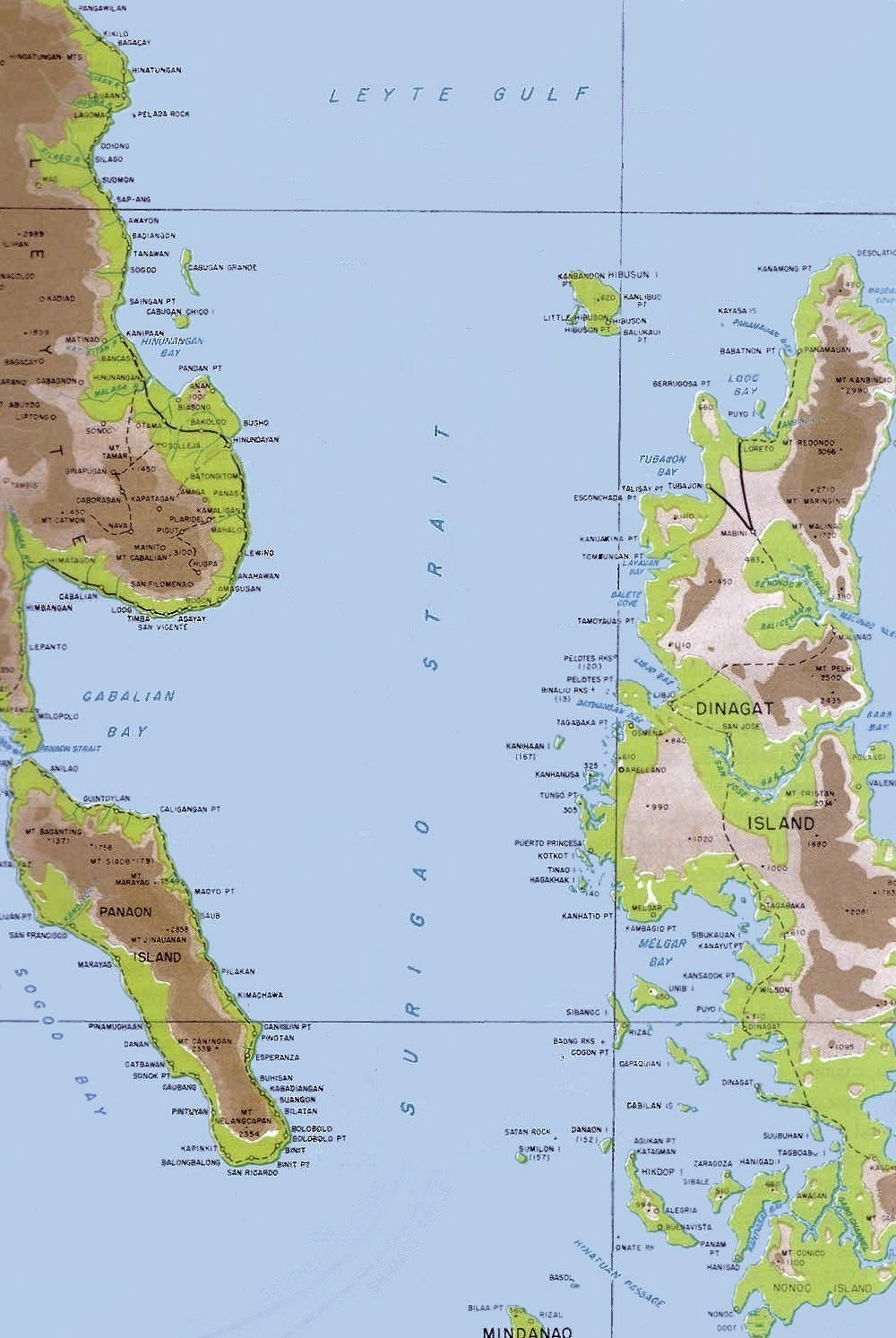
The Hibuson is seen as a pea size island landmass on this map and located between the Dinagat Island on the right and the Leyte Island on the left.

== History ==
Gibusong Island was part of the stops in Magellan's circumnavigation expedition. As a gateway passage to the Visayas, the island served as the route leading to the rest of the Visayas encounter of Magellan's expedition after their very first Visayan encounter with the Samarnons in Suluan and Homonhon, now both parts of Guiuan, Eastern Samar.

== Climate ==
Like most of the country, Gibusong is officially considered a tropical rainforest climate type, Köppen class Af with an average monthly precipitation of 308.66 mm (12.5 inches). However, it is distinctly wettest between the months of November and March. During the drier season between April and September, brief afternoon showers and thunderstorms locally called sobasco, are commonplace.

Climate data for Hibuson Island, Philippines
Month	Jan	Feb	Mar	Apr	May	Jun	Jul	Aug	Sep	Oct	Nov	Dec	Year
Mean daily maximum °C (°F)	29 (84)	29 (84)	30 (86)	31 (88)	32 (90)	32 (90)	32 (89)	32 (90)	32 (90)	32 (89)	31 (87)	29 (85)	30.92 (87.66)
Mean daily minimum °C (°F)	22 (72)	22 (72)	23 (73)	23 (74)	24 (75)	24 (75)	24 (75)	24 (75)	24 (75)	24 (75)	23 (74)	23 (73)	23 (74)
Average precipitation mm (inches)	582 (22.93)	389 (15.32)	283 (11.16)	200 (7.7)	123 (4.86)	110 (4.5)	140 (5.4)	115 (4.53)	122 (4.82)	220 (8.5)	378 (14.89)	430 (16.91)	1,015 (39.98)
Source: http://www.wunderground.com/NORMS/DisplayIntlNORMS.asp?CityCode=98653&Units=english
