= Libjo =

Municipality in Dinagat Islands, Philippines

Libjo Albor
- Municipality
- Municipality of Libjo
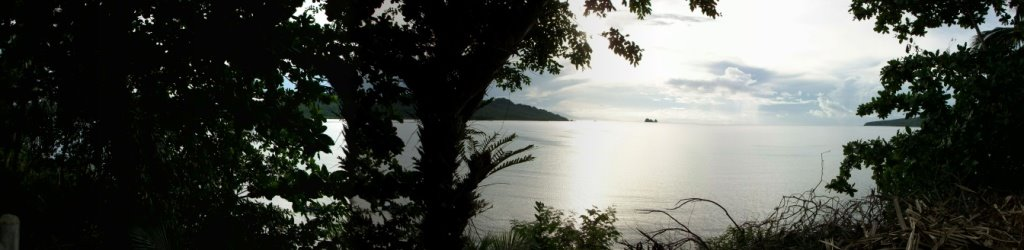

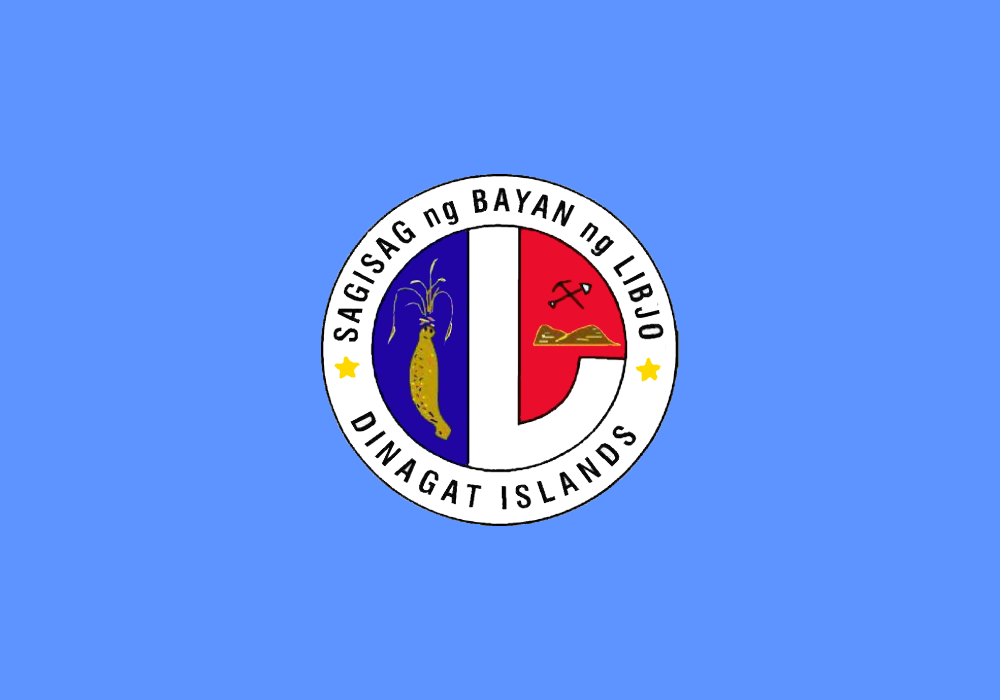
- Flag

- Map of Dinagat Islands with Libjo highlighted
- Interactive map of Libjo
- Location within the Philippines
- Coordinates: 10°11′45″N 125°31′58″E
- Country: Philippines
- Region: Caraga
- Province: Dinagat Islands
- District: Lone district
- Founded: February 29, 1960
- Barangays: 16 (see Barangays)

Government
  - Type: Sangguniang Bayan
  - Mayor: Melody L. Compasivo
  - Vice Mayor: Zoltan Arnel S. Edera
  - Representative: Alan 1 B. Ecleo
  - Municipal Council: Members: Maria Norma Fatima I. Estubo; Judel C. Gumaod; Luzviminda A. Intong; Jovelrey L. Lumpay; Andy S. Creencia; Aster L. Punay; Shelly L. Barrios; Alme D. Biore
  - Electorate: 13,040 voters (2025)

Area
  - Total: 180.57 km^{2} (69.72 sq mi)
- Elevation: 56 m (184 ft)
- Highest elevation: 438 m (1,437 ft)
- Lowest elevation: 0 m (0 ft)

Population (2024 census)
  - Total: 18,157
  - Density: 100.55/km^{2} (260.43/sq mi)
  - Households: 4,425

Economy
  - Income class: 3rd municipal income class
  - Poverty incidence: 31.53% (2023)
  - Revenue: ₱ 176.5 million (2024)
  - Assets: ₱ 493.4 million (2024)
  - Expenditure: ₱ 53.39 million (2024)
  - Liabilities: ₱ 48.79 million (2024)

Service provider
  - Electricity: Dinagat Island Electric Cooperative (DIELCO)
- Time zone: UTC+8 (PST)
- ZIP code: 8414
- PSGC: 1608504000
- IDD : area code: +63 (0)86
- Native languages: Surigaonon; Cebuano; Tagalog
- Website: www.libjodinagatislands.gov.ph

Libjo, officially the Municipality of Libjo (Surigaonon: Lungsod nan Libjo; Cebuano: Lungsod sa Libjo; Tagalog: Bayan ng Libjo; Waray: Bungto han Libjo), is a municipality in the province of Dinagat Islands, Philippines. According to the 2024 census, it has a population of 18,157 people.

It is formerly known as Albor.

== History ==
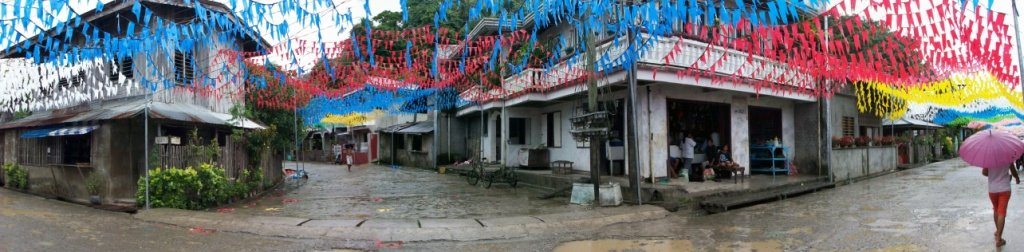
Tabo Festival in Libjo

The town became a part of the province of Dinagat Islands in December 2006, when the province was created from Surigao del Norte by Republic Act No. 9355. However, in February 2010, the Supreme Court ruled that the law was unconstitutional, as the necessary requirements for provincial land area and population were not met. The town reverted to Surigao del Norte. On October 24, 2012, however, the Supreme Court reversed its ruling from the previous year, and upheld the constitutionality of RA 9355 and the creation of Dinagat Islands as a province.

== Geography ==
=== Barangays ===
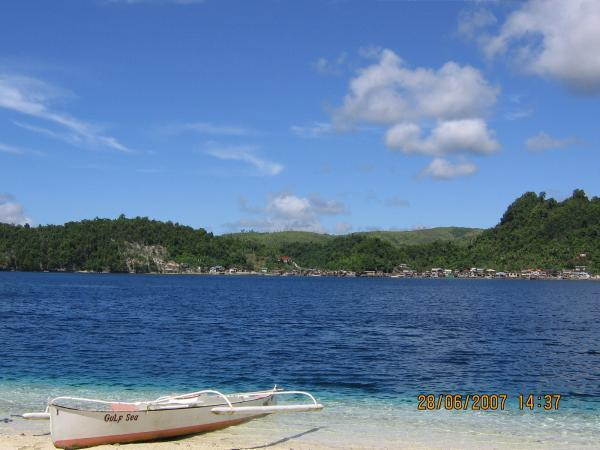
Magsaysay, Dinagat Islands

Libjo is politically subdivided into 16 barangays. Each barangay consists of puroks while some have sitios.

- Albor (Poblacion)
- Arellano (Madrid)
- Bayanihan
- Doña Helen
- Garcia
- General Aguinaldo (Bolod-bolod)
- Kanihaan
- Llamera
- Magsaysay
- Osmeña
- Plaridel
- Quezon
- Rosita
- San Antonio (Poblacion)
- San Jose
- Santo Niño

=== Climate ===
Climate data for Libjo, Dinagat Islands
Month	Jan	Feb	Mar	Apr	May	Jun	Jul	Aug	Sep	Oct	Nov	Dec	Year
Mean daily maximum °C (°F)	27 (81)	28 (82)	28 (82)	30 (86)	30 (86)	30 (86)	29 (84)	30 (86)	30 (86)	29 (84)	29 (84)	28 (82)	29 (84)
Mean daily minimum °C (°F)	23 (73)	23 (73)	23 (73)	23 (73)	25 (77)	25 (77)	25 (77)	25 (77)	25 (77)	25 (77)	24 (75)	24 (75)	24 (75)
Average precipitation mm (inches)	210 (8.3)	161 (6.3)	123 (4.8)	85 (3.3)	148 (5.8)	186 (7.3)	164 (6.5)	157 (6.2)	141 (5.6)	190 (7.5)	223 (8.8)	200 (7.9)	1,988 (78.3)
Average rainy days	21.0	16.8	18.5	18.2	24.9	27.7	28.4	27.0	26.1	27.6	24.6	22.0	282.8
Source: Meteoblue

== Demographics ==
Population census of Libjo
Year	Pop.	±% p.a.
1970	6,959	—
1975	5,801	−3.58%
1980	10,290	+12.14%
1990	14,170	+3.25%
1995	14,928	+0.98%
2000	16,610	+2.32%
2007	18,116	+1.20%
2010	17,567	−1.11%
2015	17,760	+0.21%
2020	18,051	+0.34%
2024	18,157	+0.14%
Source: Philippine Statistics Authority

== Economy ==
Poverty incidence of Libjo (%)

Source: Philippine Statistics Authority

== See also ==
- List of renamed cities and municipalities in the Philippines
