= Cagdianao =

Municipality in Dinagat Islands, Philippines

- Municipality
- Municipality of Cagdianao
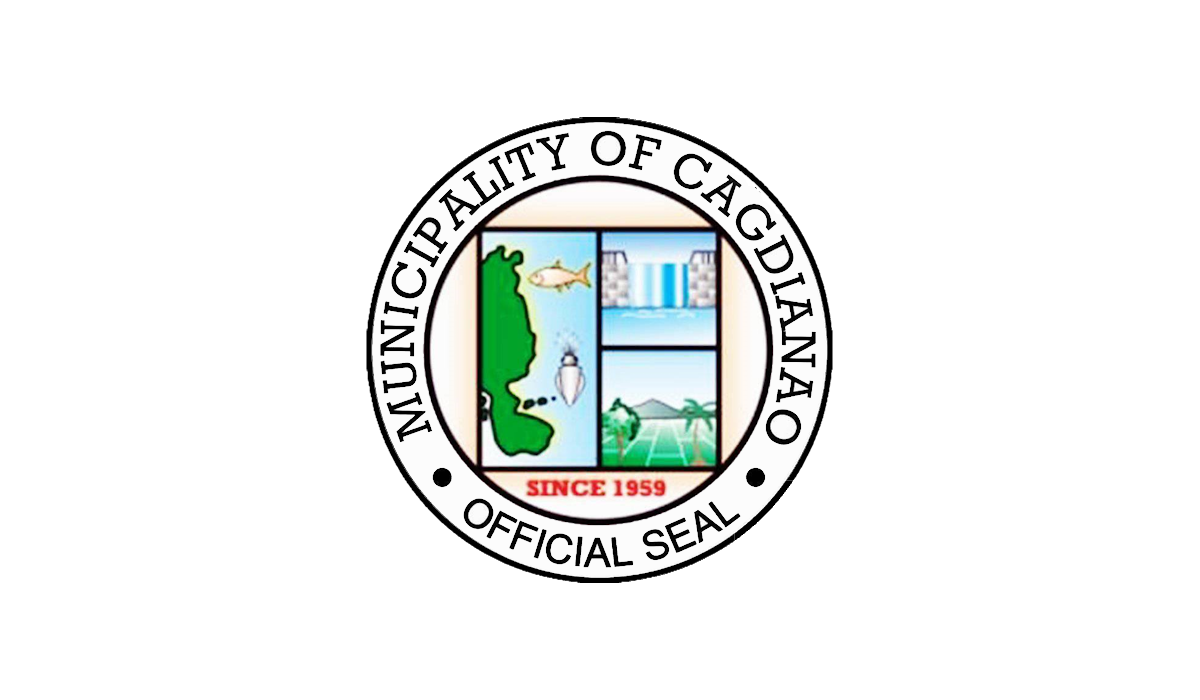
- Flag

- Map of Dinagat Islands with Cagdianao highlighted
- Interactive map of Cagdianao
- Location within the Philippines
- Coordinates: 9°55′N 125°40′E
- Country: Philippines
- Region: Caraga
- Province: Dinagat Islands
- District: Lone district
- Founded: December 23, 1959
- Barangays: 14 (see Barangays)

Government
  - Type: Sangguniang Bayan
  - Mayor: Marc Adelson D. Longos
  - Vice Mayor: Rufino P. Fermilan Jr.
  - Representative: Alan 1 B. Ecleo
  - Municipal Council: Members: Ian Mark S. Ecleo; Reyna An B. Ecleo; Renieboy S. Tillo; Alexis B. Tugay; Edito M. Paco; Jackie Chan E. Eupeña; Ali F. Fermilan; Nestor L. Mangalao
  - Electorate: 13,114 voters (2025)

Area
  - Total: 249.48 km^{2} (96.32 sq mi)
- Elevation: 53 m (174 ft)
- Highest elevation: 529 m (1,736 ft)
- Lowest elevation: 0 m (0 ft)

Population (2024 census)
  - Total: 18,679
  - Density: 74.872/km^{2} (193.92/sq mi)
  - Households: 4,466

Economy
  - Income class: 1st municipal income class
  - Poverty incidence: 30.69% (2023)
  - Revenue: ₱ 292.8 million (2024)
  - Assets: ₱ 876.4 million (2024)
  - Expenditure: ₱ 225.6 million (2024)
  - Liabilities: ₱ 49.04 million (2024)

Service provider
  - Electricity: Dinagat Island Electric Cooperative (DIELCO)
- Time zone: UTC+8 (PST)
- ZIP code: 8411
- PSGC: 1608502000
- IDD : area code: +63 (0)86
- Native languages: Surigaonon; Cebuano; Tagalog

Cagdianao, officially the Municipality of Cagdianao (Surigaonon: Lungsod nan Cagdianao; Cebuano: Lungsod sa Cagdianao; Tagalog: Bayan ng Cagdianao), is a municipality in the province of Dinagat Islands, Philippines. According to the 2024 census, it has a population of 18,679 people.

== Etymology ==
Cagdianao is derived from kagdianao, an alternate form of kaagdao-an, meaning "place where mangroves grow", from agdao, a local name for a species of mangrove.

== History ==
The town became a part of the province of Dinagat Islands in December 2006, when the province was created from Surigao del Norte by Republic Act No. 9355. However, in February 2010, the Supreme Court ruled that the law was unconstitutional, as the necessary requirements for provincial land area and population were not met. The town reverted to Surigao del Norte. On October 24, 2012, however, the Supreme Court reversed its ruling from the previous year, and upheld the constitutionality of RA 9355 and the creation of Dinagat Islands as a province.

== Geography ==
=== Barangays ===
Cagdianao is politically subdivided into 14 barangays. Each barangay consists of puroks while some have sitios.

- Boa
- Cabunga-an
- Del Pilar
- Laguna
- Legaspi
- Ma-atas
- Mabini
- Nueva Estrella
- Poblacion
- R. Ecleo
- San Jose
- Santa Rita
- Tigbao
- Valencia

=== Climate ===
Climate data for Cagdianao, Dinagat Islands
Month	Jan	Feb	Mar	Apr	May	Jun	Jul	Aug	Sep	Oct	Nov	Dec	Year
Mean daily maximum °C (°F)	27 (81)	28 (82)	28 (82)	30 (86)	30 (86)	30 (86)	29 (84)	30 (86)	30 (86)	29 (84)	29 (84)	28 (82)	29 (84)
Mean daily minimum °C (°F)	23 (73)	23 (73)	23 (73)	23 (73)	25 (77)	25 (77)	25 (77)	25 (77)	25 (77)	25 (77)	24 (75)	24 (75)	24 (75)
Average precipitation mm (inches)	210 (8.3)	161 (6.3)	123 (4.8)	85 (3.3)	148 (5.8)	186 (7.3)	164 (6.5)	157 (6.2)	141 (5.6)	190 (7.5)	223 (8.8)	200 (7.9)	1,988 (78.3)
Average rainy days	21.0	16.8	18.5	18.2	24.9	27.7	28.4	27.0	26.1	27.6	24.6	22.0	282.8
Source: Meteoblue (Use with caution: this is modeled/calculated data, not measured locally.)

== Demographics ==
Population census of Cagdianao
Year	Pop.	±% p.a.
1960	4,342	—
1970	4,827	+1.06%
1975	5,789	+3.71%
1980	8,435	+7.82%
1990	11,555	+3.20%
1995	11,175	−0.62%
2000	12,886	+3.10%
2007	14,130	+1.28%
2010	15,047	+2.31%
2015	16,808	+2.13%
2020	18,350	+1.86%
2024	18,679	+0.43%
Source: Philippine Statistics Authority

== Economy ==
Poverty incidence of Cagdianao (%)

Source: Philippine Statistics Authority
