= Surigao Strait =

Strait connecting Leyte Gulf and Bohol Sea in the Philippines

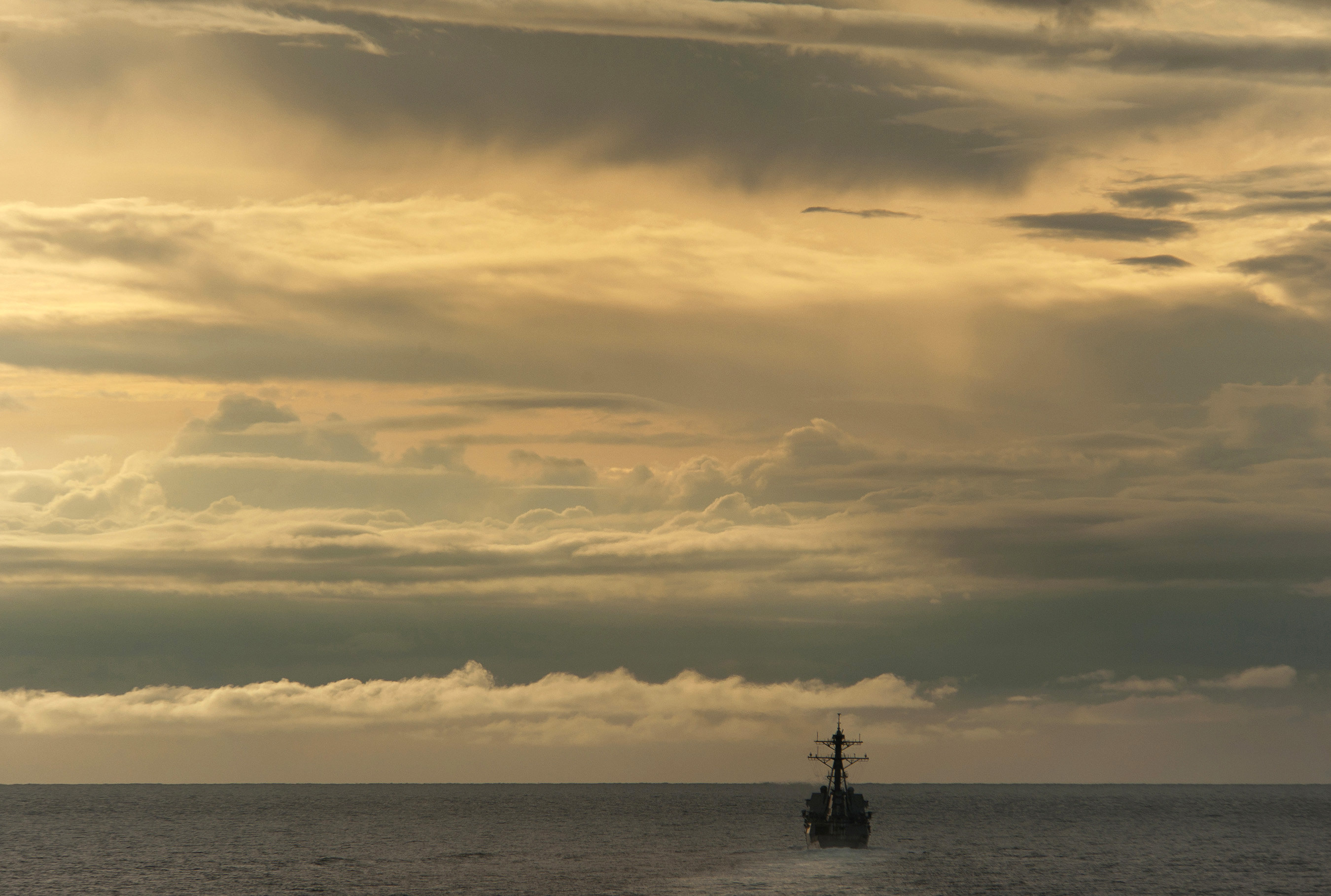
- The US Navy guided-missile destroyer USS Gridley in the Surigao Strait

- Location within Philippines

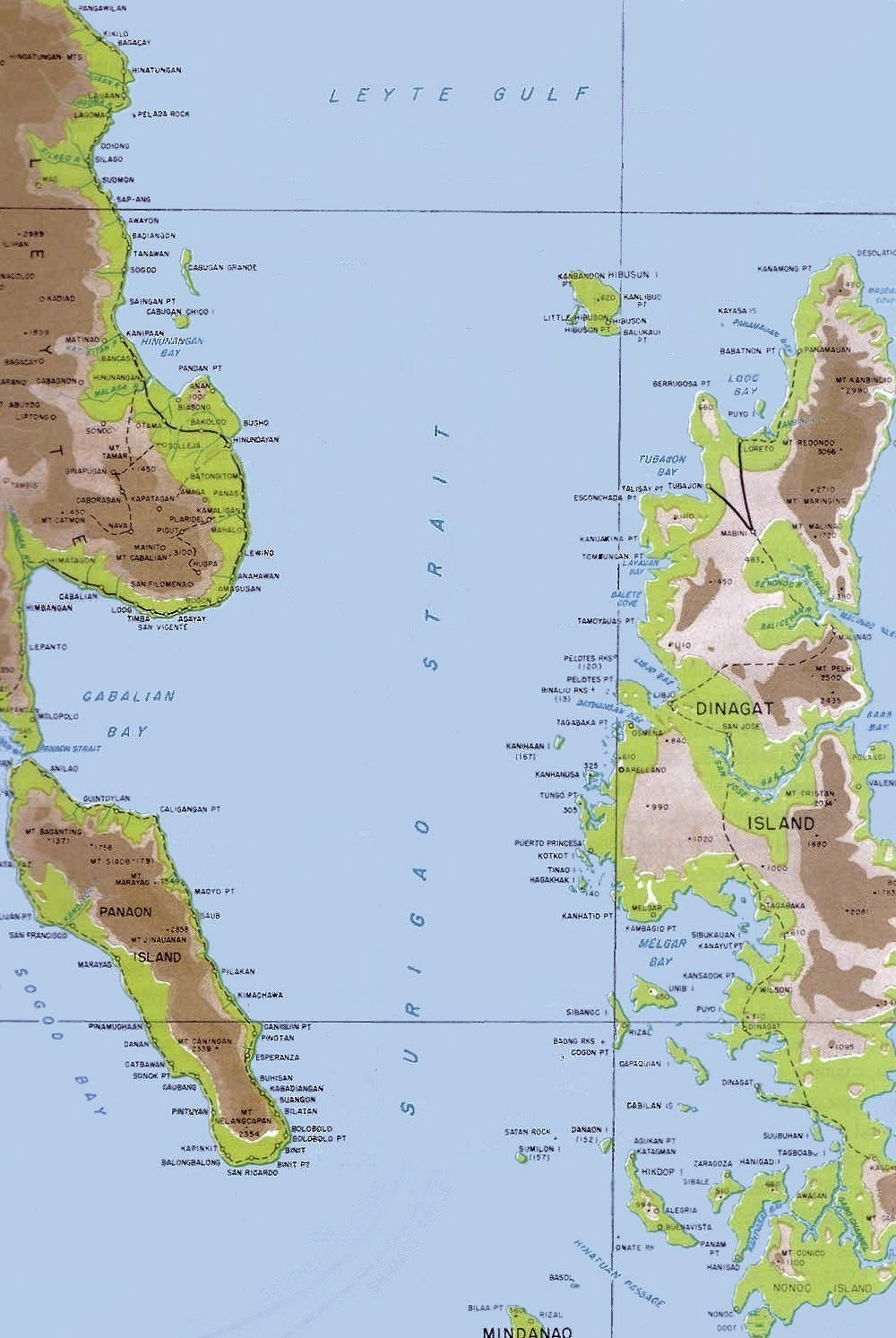
- Location: Eastern Visayas, Caraga
- Coordinates: 10°10′N 125°23′E
- Type: Strait
- Max. length: 75 km (47 mi)
- Max. width: 25 km (16 mi)

Surigao Strait (Filipino: Kipot ng Surigaw) is a strait in the southern Philippines, between the Bohol Sea and Leyte Gulf of the Philippine Sea.

== Geography ==
It is located between the regions of Visayas and Mindanao. It lies between northern Mindanao Island and Panaon Island, and between the Dinagat Islands and Leyte island.

The strait is deep but has a strong current, up to 8 knots (15 km/h; 9.2 mph). The northern entrance of the Surigao Strait is marked by a navigation light on Suluan Island.

The Hibuson island lies at the north end of the Surigao Strait.

== Transport ==
It is regularly crossed by numerous ferries that transport goods and people between Visayas and Mindanao. The ferries stop at Liloan, Southern Leyte and Surigao City in Surigao del Norte.

== Etymology ==
According to legend, the strait was named after Solibao, a Negrito chieftain, who lived at the outlet of the Surigao River. Migrating Visayan fishermen gradually formed a settlement there, and when Spanish explorers visited the place, they probably misheard the name as Surigao instead of Solibao. A different theory explains that Surigao may be derived from the Spanish word surgir, meaning "swift water" or "current".

== History ==
In March 1521 during the first circumnavigation of the Earth, Ferdinand Magellan and his crew were the first Europeans to sail through the strait.

The Battle of Surigao Strait took place here on October 25, 1944. The American battleships of the U.S. 7th Fleet Support Force commanded by Rear Admiral Jesse B. Oldendorf were able to "cross the T" against Vice Admiral Shoji Nishimura's Southern Force; nearly all of which, including the battleships Yamashiro and Fusō, were sunk. All but one of these American battleships had been in Pearl Harbor during the Japanese sneak attack and either damaged or sunk and subsequently refloated and repaired.
