= Loreto, Dinagat Islands =

Municipality in Dinagat Islands, Philippines

Loreto
- Municipality
- Municipality of Loreto
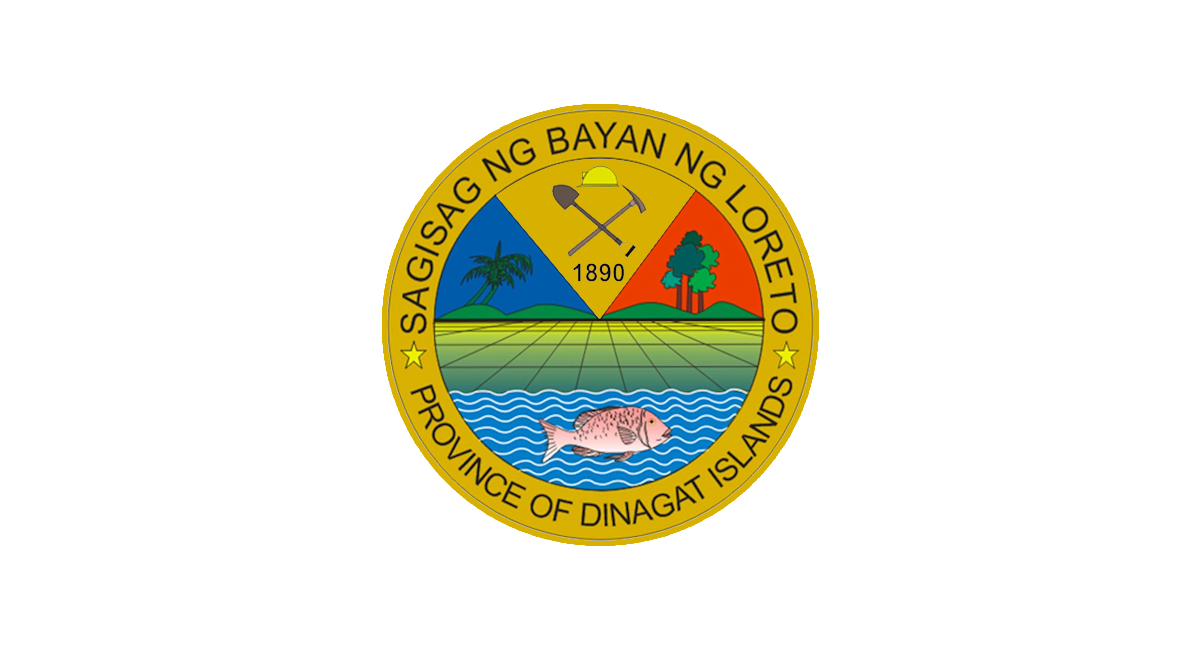
- Flag
- Nickname: Last Frontier of Dinagat
- Map of Dinagat Islands with Loreto highlighted
- Interactive map of Loreto
- Location within the Philippines
- Coordinates: 10°21′31″N 125°34′54″E
- Country: Philippines
- Region: Caraga
- Province: Dinagat Islands
- District: Lone district
- Founded: January 1, 1919
- Barangays: 10 (see Barangays)

Government
  - Type: Sangguniang Bayan
  - Mayor: Doandre Bill A. Ladaga
  - Vice Mayor: Richard C. Tan
  - Representative: Alan 1 B. Ecleo
  - Municipal Council: Members: Jhosua T. Luib; Gordiaco G. Cabas Jr.; Edilberto D. Abayan; Alfonso B. Gajol; Gemma A. Lumag; Eileen A. Daguinod; Annie D. Morales; Neil B. Limpioso
  - Electorate: 8,150 voters (2025)

Area
  - Total: 255.87 km^{2} (98.79 sq mi)
- Elevation: 3 m (9.8 ft)
- Highest elevation: 764 m (2,507 ft)
- Lowest elevation: 0 m (0 ft)

Population (2024 census)
  - Total: 9,940
  - Density: 38.8/km^{2} (101/sq mi)
  - Households: 2,427

Economy
  - Income class: 2nd municipal income class
  - Poverty incidence: 26.21% (2023)
  - Revenue: ₱ 217.9 million (2024)
  - Assets: ₱ 599.3 million (2024)
  - Expenditure: ₱ 159.2 million (2024)
  - Liabilities: ₱ 127.8 million (2024)

Service provider
  - Electricity: Dinagat Island Electric Cooperative (DIELCO)
- Time zone: UTC+8 (PST)
- ZIP code: 8415
- PSGC: 1608505000
- IDD : area code: +63 (0)86
- Native languages: Surigaonon; Cebuano; Tagalog; Waray

Loreto, officially the Municipality of Loreto (Cebuano: Lungsod sa Loreto; Surigaonon: Lungsod nan Loreto; Tagalog: Bayan ng Loreto; Waray: Bungto han Loreto), is a municipality in the province of Dinagat Islands, Philippines. According to the 2024 census, it has a population of 9,940 people.

== History ==
The town became a part of the province of Dinagat Islands on October 2, 2006, when the province was created from Surigao del Norte by Republic Act No. 9355. However, in February 2010, the Supreme Court ruled that the law was unconstitutional, as the necessary requirements for provincial land area and population were not met. The town reverted to Surigao del Norte. On October 24, 2012, however, the Supreme Court reversed its ruling from the previous year, and upheld the constitutionality of RA 9355 and the creation of Dinagat Islands as a province.

In 1956, the sitio of Roxas was converted into a barrio.

== Geography ==
=== Barangays ===
Loreto is politically subdivided into 10 barangays. Each barangay consists of puroks while some have sitios.

- Carmen (Poblacion)
- Esperanza
- Ferdinand
- Helen (on Gibusong Island)
- Liberty (on Gibusong Island)
- Magsaysay (on Gibusong Island)
- Panamaon
- San Juan (Poblacion)
- Santa Cruz (Poblacion)
- Santiago (Poblacion)

=== Climate ===
Climate data for Loreto, Dinagat Islands
Month	Jan	Feb	Mar	Apr	May	Jun	Jul	Aug	Sep	Oct	Nov	Dec	Year
Mean daily maximum °C (°F)	27 (81)	27 (81)	28 (82)	29 (84)	30 (86)	29 (84)	29 (84)	29 (84)	29 (84)	29 (84)	28 (82)	28 (82)	29 (83)
Mean daily minimum °C (°F)	23 (73)	22 (72)	22 (72)	23 (73)	24 (75)	25 (77)	24 (75)	24 (75)	24 (75)	24 (75)	24 (75)	23 (73)	24 (74)
Average precipitation mm (inches)	210 (8.3)	161 (6.3)	123 (4.8)	85 (3.3)	148 (5.8)	186 (7.3)	164 (6.5)	157 (6.2)	141 (5.6)	190 (7.5)	223 (8.8)	200 (7.9)	1,988 (78.3)
Average rainy days	21.0	16.8	18.5	18.2	24.9	27.7	28.4	27.0	26.1	27.6	24.6	22.0	282.8
Source: Meteoblue

== Demographics ==
Population census of Loreto
Year	Pop.	±% p.a.
1903	2,193	—
1939	6,623	+3.12%
1948	6,212	−0.71%
1960	8,324	+2.47%
1970	5,020	−4.93%
1975	5,270	+0.98%
1980	5,530	+0.97%
1990	7,340	+2.87%
1995	8,048	+1.74%
2000	8,751	+1.81%
2007	9,030	+0.43%
2010	8,920	−0.45%
2015	9,309	+0.82%
2020	9,690	+0.85%
2024	9,940	+0.61%
Source: Philippine Statistics Authority

== Economy ==
Poverty incidence of Loreto (%)

Source: Philippine Statistics Authority

The town is endowed with rich mineral resources like aluminous laterite ore, chromite, gold, niceliferous laterite, sand and gravel, guano, rock phosphate, limestone, and siliceous sand. It is also considered as an excellent fishing ground.
