= Ecleo =

Ecleo is a Filipino surname that may refer to the political family of Dinagat, Dinagat Islands:

- Alan Uno Ecleo (born 1969), Filipino politician
- Glenda Ecleo (1937–2024), Filipina politician
- Gwendolyn Ecleo (born 1974), Filipina politician
- Jade Ecleo (born 1970), Filipina politician and part-time actress/singer
- Ruben Ecleo Sr. (1934–1987), founder of the Philippine Benevolent Missionaries Association
- Ruben Ecleo Jr. (1960–2021), Filipino politician, second leader of the Philippine Benevolent Missionaries Association
