= 2025 Philippine House of Representatives elections in Caraga =

- May 12, 2025
- All 9 Caraga seats in the House of Representatives
Party	Seats	+/–
Lakas	3	+1
Nacionalista	2	+1
NUP	2	0
PFP	1	New
Liberal	1	+1
This lists parties that won seats. See the complete results below.

The 2025 Philippine House of Representatives elections in Caraga were held on May 12, 2025, as part of the 2025 Philippine general election.

== Summary ==
Congressional district	Incumbent	Incumbent's party	Winner	Winner's party	Winning margin
Agusan del Norte	Dale Corvera	Lakas	Dale Corvera	Lakas	Unopposed
Agusan del Sur–1st	Alfel Bascug	NUP	Alfel Bascug	NUP	Unopposed
Agusan del Sur–2nd	Eddiebong Plaza	NUP	Eddiebong Plaza	NUP	Unopposed
Butuan	New district		Jose Aquino II	Lakas	Unopposed
Dinagat Islands	Alan Ecleo	Lakas	Kaka Bag-ao	Liberal	9.82%
Surigao del Norte–1st	Francisco Jose Matugas II	Lakas	Francisco Matugas	Lakas	25.16%
Surigao del Norte–2nd	Ace Barbers	Nacionalista	Bernadette Barbers	Nacionalista	10.71%
Surigao del Sur–1st	Romeo Momo	Nacionalista	Romeo Momo	Nacionalista	45.64%
Surigao del Sur–2nd	Johnny Pimentel	NUP	Alexander Pimentel	PFP	7.77%

== Agusan del Norte ==
As a result of Agusan del Norte being redistricted in 2022, the district was recreated with the municipality of Las Nieves, which used to be under the 1st district, and the municipalities that were under the 2nd district.

Dale Corvera of Lakas–CMD, the incumbent of Agusan del Norte's 2nd district, won re-election for a second term unopposed in this district. He was previously affiliated with PDP–Laban.

Candidate	Party	Votes	%
Dale Corvera (incumbent)	Lakas–CMD	177,431	100.00
Total		177,431	100.00
Valid votes		177,431	79.59
Invalid/blank votes		45,491	20.41
Total votes		222,922	100.00
Registered voters/turnout		272,163	81.91
Lakas hold			
Source: Commission on Elections

== Agusan del Sur ==
=== 1st district ===
Incumbent Alfel Bascug of the National Unity Party won re-election for a third term unopposed.

Candidate	Party	Votes	%
Alfel Bascug (incumbent)	National Unity Party	110,340	100.00
Total		110,340	100.00
Valid votes		110,340	64.61
Invalid/blank votes		60,434	35.39
Total votes		170,774	100.00
Registered voters/turnout		214,205	79.72
NUP hold			
Source: Commission on Elections

=== 2nd district ===
Incumbent Eddiebong Plaza of the National Unity Party won re-election for a third term unopposed.

Candidate	Party	Votes	%
Eddiebong Plaza (incumbent)	National Unity Party	130,965	100.00
Total		130,965	100.00
Valid votes		130,965	70.04
Invalid/blank votes		56,016	29.96
Total votes		186,981	100.00
Registered voters/turnout		232,437	80.44
NUP hold			
Source: Commission on Elections

== Butuan ==
As a result of Butuan being redistricted in 2022, a district was created for the city. Butuan used to be under Agusan del Norte's 1st district prior to redistricting.

Incumbent Agusan del Norte's 1st district representative Jose Aquino II of Lakas–CMD won re-election for a second term unopposed in this district.

Candidate	Party	Votes	%
Jose Aquino II (incumbent)	Lakas–CMD	107,974	100.00
Total		107,974	100.00
Valid votes		107,974	59.74
Invalid/blank votes		72,771	40.26
Total votes		180,745	100.00
Registered voters/turnout		220,694	81.90
Lakas hold			
Source: Commission on Elections

== Dinagat Islands ==
Incumbent Alan Ecleo of Lakas–CMD ran for a third term.

Ecleo was defeated by former Dinagat Islands governor Kaka Bag-ao of the Liberal Party.

Candidate	Party	Votes	%
Kaka Bag-ao	Liberal Party	36,958	54.91
Alan Ecleo (incumbent)	Lakas–CMD	30,347	45.09
Total		67,305	100.00
Valid votes		67,305	94.75
Invalid/blank votes		3,728	5.25
Total votes		71,033	100.00
Registered voters/turnout		81,673	86.97
Liberal gain from Lakas			
Source: Commission on Elections

== Surigao del Norte ==
=== 1st district ===
Term-limited incumbent Francisco Jose Matugas II of Lakas–CMD ran for governor of Surigao del Norte. He was previously affiliated with PDP–Laban.

Lakas–CMD nominated Matugas' father, former Surigao del Norte governor Francisco Matugas, who won re-election against two other candidates.

Candidate	Party	Votes	%
Francisco Matugas	Lakas–CMD	60,350	62.20
Lucille Sering	Nacionalista Party	35,934	37.04
Lane Pangilinan	Independent	738	0.76
Total		97,022	100.00
Valid votes		97,022	93.95
Invalid/blank votes		6,248	6.05
Total votes		103,270	100.00
Registered voters/turnout		113,571	90.93
Lakas hold			
Source: Commission on Elections

=== 2nd district ===
Incumbent Ace Barbers of the Nacionalista Party was term-limited.

The Nacionalista Party nominated Barbers' wife, Bernadette Barbers, who won re-election against four other candidates.

Candidate	Party	Votes	%
Bernadette Barbers	Nacionalista Party	124,526	54.10
Jun Jun Egay	Padajon Surigao Party	99,856	43.39
Antonio Mainit Jr.	Independent	2,441	1.06
Rodel Villanueva	Independent	1,699	0.74
Gil Masuhay	Independent	1,637	0.71
Total		230,159	100.00
Valid votes		230,159	89.01
Invalid/blank votes		28,431	10.99
Total votes		258,590	100.00
Registered voters/turnout		293,485	88.11
Nacionalista hold			
Source: Commission on Elections

== Surigao del Sur ==
=== 1st district ===
Incumbent Romeo Momo of the Nacionalista Party ran for a second term. He was previously an independent.

Momo won re-election against Marihatag mayor Justin Pelenio (Aksyon Demokratiko).

Candidate	Party	Votes	%
Romeo Momo (incumbent)	Nacionalista Party	161,895	72.82
Justin Pelenio	Aksyon Demokratiko	60,416	27.18
Total		222,311	100.00
Valid votes		222,311	91.76
Invalid/blank votes		19,955	8.24
Total votes		242,266	100.00
Registered voters/turnout		276,452	87.63
Nacionalista hold			
Source: Commission on Elections

=== 2nd district ===
Term-limited incumbent Johnny Pimentel of the National Unity Party ran for governor of Surigao del Sur. He was previously affiliated with PDP–Laban.

Pimentel endorsed his brother, Surigao del Sur governor Alexander Pimentel (Partido Federal ng Pilipinas), who won the election against former Cantilan mayor Carla Lopez-Pichay (Lakas–CMD) and two other candidates.

Candidate	Party	Votes	%
Alexander Pimentel	Partido Federal ng Pilipinas	86,026	52.04
Carla Lopez-Pichay	Lakas–CMD	73,175	44.27
Carl Pichay	Independent	5,310	3.21
Dhods Manlino	Independent	800	0.48
Total		165,311	100.00
Valid votes		165,311	93.65
Invalid/blank votes		11,210	6.35
Total votes		176,521	100.00
Registered voters/turnout		200,237	88.16
PFP gain from NUP			
Source: Commission on Elections
