= 2013 Philippine House of Representatives elections in Caraga =

Elections will be held in Caraga for seats in the House of Representatives of the Philippines on May 13, 2013.

== Summary ==
Party	Popular vote	%	Swing	Seats won	Change
Liberal				5	
NUP				2	
Kusug Agusanon				1	
Lakas				1	
Aksyon				0	
Makabayan				0	
Nacionalista				0	
NPC				0	
UNA				0	
Independent				0	
Valid votes				9	
Invalid votes					
Turnout					
Registered voters					

== Agusan del Norte ==
=== 1st District ===
Incumbent Jose Aquino II is not running for the position; instead, he is running for Butuan's mayorship. His Lakas–CMD party did not name a nominee in this district.

2013 Philippine House of Representatives election at Agusan del Norte's 1st district
Party	Candidate	Votes	%	±%
Liberal	Lawrence Lemuel Fortun			
UNA	Roan Libarios			
Margin of victory				
Rejected ballots				
Turnout				
Liberal gain from Lakas		Swing		

=== 2nd District ===
Incumbent Angelica Amante-Matba is not running. Her brother incumbent Governor Erlpe John Amante is running unopposed.

2013 Philippine House of Representatives election at Agusan del Norte's 2nd district
Party	Candidate	Votes	%	±%
Kusug Agusanon	Erlpe John Amante			
Margin of victory				
Rejected ballots				
Turnout				
Kusug Agusanon hold		Swing		

== Agusan del Sur ==
=== 1st District ===
Maria Valentina Plaza is the incumbent.

2013 Philippine House of Representatives election at Agusan del Sur's 1st district
Party	Candidate	Votes	%	±%
Liberal	Roberto Aquino			
NUP	Maria Valentina Plaza			
Margin of victory				
Rejected ballots				
Turnout				
NUP hold		Swing		

=== 2nd District ===
Evelyn Mellana is the incumbent. She will face former Representative Rodolfo Plaza.

2013 Philippine House of Representatives election at Agusan del Sur's 2nd district
Party	Candidate	Votes	%	±%
NUP	Evelyn Mellana			
NPC	Rodolfo Plaza			
Margin of victory				
Rejected ballots				
Turnout				
NUP hold		Swing		

== Dinagat Islands ==
Incumbent Ruben Ecleo Jr. has been dropped from the rolls of the House of Representatives after the Supreme Court ruled that the Sandiganbayan's conviction of Ecleo on graft was valid. No special election was held. Dinagat Mayor Gwendolyn Ecleo is his party's nominee. She will face incumbent Akbayan Partylist Representative Kaka Bag-ao, who is running as guest candidate of the Liberal Party.

2013 Philippine House of Representatives election at Dinagat Islands
Party	Candidate	Votes	%	±%
Liberal	Kaka Bag-ao			
Nacionalista	Gwendolyn Ecleo			
Margin of victory				
Rejected ballots				
Turnout				
Liberal win				

== Surigao del Norte ==
=== 1st District ===
Francisco Matugas is the Incumbent.

2013 Philippine House of Representatives election at Surigao del Norte's 1st district
Party	Candidate	Votes	%	±%
Makabayan	Teodulfo Espejon			
Liberal	Francisco Matugas			
Independent	Gertrudes Saberon			
Margin of victory				
Rejected ballots				
Turnout				
Liberal hold		Swing		

=== 2nd District ===
Guillermo Romarate Jr. is Incumbent.

2013 Philippine House of Representatives election at Surigao del Norte's 2nd district
Party	Candidate	Votes	%	±%
Nacionalista	Robert Ace Barbers			
Independent	Pepito Lago			
Liberal	Guillermo Romarate Jr.			
Margin of victory				
Rejected ballots				
Turnout				
Liberal hold		Swing		

== Surigao del Sur ==
=== 1st District ===
Philip Pichay is Incumbent.

2013 Philippine House of Representatives election at Surigao del Sur's 1st district
Party	Candidate	Votes	%	±%
Liberal	Mary Elizabeth Delgado			
Independent	Victor Murillo			
Lakas	Philip Pichay			
Margin of victory				
Rejected ballots				
Turnout				
Lakas hold		Swing		

=== 2nd District ===
Florencio Garay is the Incumbent.

2013 Philippine House of Representatives election at Surigao del Sur's 2nd district
Party	Candidate	Votes	%	±%
UNA	Mario Alvizo			
Liberal	Florencio Garay			
Margin of victory				
Rejected ballots				
Turnout				
Liberal hold		Swing		
