= Islander's Castle =

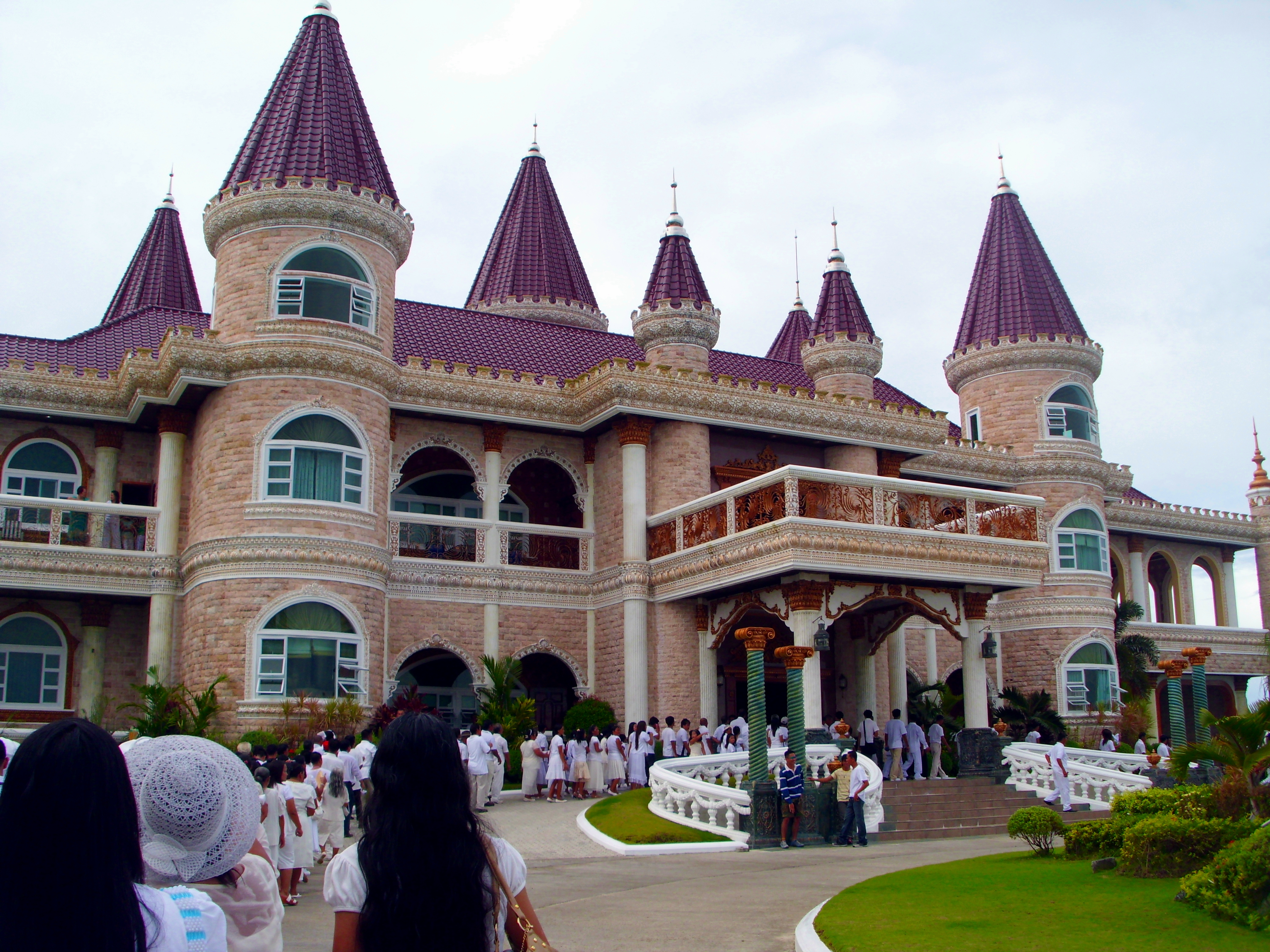
- Interactive map of the Islander's Castle area

General information
- Type: Mansion
- Location: Dinagat Islands, Aurelio, San Jose, Philippines
- Coordinates: 10°00′21″N 125°58′43″E
- Current tenants: Governor Glenda Ecleo

Technical details
- Structural system: Masonry

Design and construction
- Designations: None

Islander's Castle is a residence of Governor Glenda Ecleo, of Dinagat Islands. Although not open to the public, the home can be viewed from the gates. The building, also known as the "White Castle", was erected by Glenda Ecleo, widow of Ruben Ecleo, in 2007, reportedly cost P350 million (approximately US$ 8 million) to build, and has been noted as overlooking a vista of shanties and unfinished roads.
