= 2022 Philippine House of Representatives elections in Caraga =

- May 9, 2022
- All 9 Caraga seats in the House of Representatives
Party	Seats	+/–
PDP–Laban	3	−1
NUP	2	0
Lakas	2	+1
Nacionalista	1	−1
Independent	1	+1
This lists parties that won seats. See the complete results below.

The 2022 Philippine House of Representatives elections in Caraga were held on May 9, 2022.

== Summary ==
Congressional district	Incumbent	Incumbent's party	Winner	Winner's party	Winning margin
Agusan del Norte–1st	Lawrence Fortun	Nacionalista	Jose Aquino II	Lakas	3.91%
Agusan del Norte–2nd	Angelica Amante	PDP–Laban	Dale Corvera	PDP–Laban	57.50%
Agusan del Sur–1st	Alfel Bascug	NUP	Alfel Bascug	NUP	Unopposed
Agusan del Sur–2nd	Eddiebong Plaza	NUP	Eddiebong Plaza	NUP	Unopposed
Dinagat Islands	Alan Ecleo	Lakas	Alan Ecleo	Lakas	29.44%
Surigao del Norte–1st	Francisco Jose Matugas II	PDP–Laban	Francisco Jose Matugas II	PDP–Laban	22.40%
Surigao del Norte–2nd	Ace Barbers	Nacionalista	Ace Barbers	Nacionalista	43.12%
Surigao del Sur–1st	Prospero Pichay Jr.	Lakas	Romeo Momo	Independent	4.33%
Surigao del Sur–2nd	Johnny Pimentel	PDP–Laban	Johnny Pimentel	PDP–Laban	51.86%

== Agusan del Norte ==
=== 1st district ===
Term-limited incumbent Lawrence Fortun of the Nacionalista Party ran for vice mayor of Butuan.

Butuan vice mayor Jose Aquino II (Lakas–CMD) won the election against two other candidates.

Candidate	Party	Votes	%
Jose Aquino II	Lakas–CMD	77,250	45.25
Kidz Libarios	People's Reform Party	72,347	42.38
Ronel Azarcon	PDP–Laban	21,123	12.37
Total		170,720	100.00
Total votes		212,531	–
Registered voters/turnout		246,909	86.08
Lakas gain from Nacionalista			
Source: Commission on Elections

=== 2nd District ===
Incumbent Angelica Amante of PDP–Laban retired to run for governor of Agusan del Norte.

PDP–Laban nominated Agusan del Norte governor Dale Corvera, who won the election against Inday Atenta (People's Reform Party).

Candidate	Party	Votes	%
Dale Corvera	PDP–Laban	145,947	78.75
Inday Atenta	People's Reform Party	39,385	21.25
Total		185,332	100.00
Total votes		216,010	–
Registered voters/turnout		255,207	84.64
PDP–Laban hold			
Source: Commission on Elections

== Agusan del Sur ==
=== 1st district ===
Incumbent Alfel Bascug of the National Unity Party won re-election for a second term unopposed.

Candidate	Party	Votes	%
Alfel Bascug (incumbent)	National Unity Party	119,773	100.00
Total		119,773	100.00
Total votes		174,060	–
Registered voters/turnout		211,906	82.14
NUP hold			
Source: Commission on Elections

=== 2nd district ===
Incumbent Eddiebong Plaza of the National Unity Party won re-election for a second term unopposed.

Candidate	Party	Votes	%
Eddiebong Plaza (incumbent)	National Unity Party	144,042	100.00
Total		144,042	100.00
Total votes		190,929	–
Registered voters/turnout		230,722	82.75
NUP hold			
Source: Commission on Elections

== Dinagat Islands ==
Incumbent Alan Ecleo of Lakas–CMD ran for a second term.

Ecleo won re-election against his sister, former Dinagat Islands governor Jade Ecleo (Liberal Party).

Candidate	Party	Votes	%
Alan Ecleo (incumbent)	Lakas–CMD	37,458	64.72
Jade Ecleo	Liberal Party	20,415	35.28
Total		57,873	100.00
Total votes		66,558	–
Registered voters/turnout		81,088	82.08
Lakas hold			
Source: Commission on Elections

== Surigao del Norte ==
=== 1st district ===
Incumbent Francisco Jose Matugas II of PDP–Laban ran for a third term.

Matugas won re-election against former Climate Change Commission vice chairperson Lucille Sering (Nacionalista Party) and Lane Pangilinan (People's Reform Party).

Candidate	Party	Votes	%
Francisco Jose Matugas II (incumbent)	PDP–Laban	50,250	60.81
Lucille Sering	Nacionalista Party	31,742	38.41
Lane Pangilinan	People's Reform Party	642	0.78
Total		82,634	100.00
Total votes		91,992	–
Registered voters/turnout		104,691	87.87
Nacionalista gain from PDP–Laban			
Source: Commission on Elections

=== 2nd district ===
Incumbent Ace Barbers of the Nacionalista Party ran for a third term.

Barbers won re-election against Surigao City councilor Lolong Larong (PDP–Laban).

Candidate	Party	Votes	%
Ace Barbers (incumbent)	Nacionalista Party	162,489	71.56
Lolong Larong	PDP–Laban	64,592	28.44
Total		227,081	100.00
Total votes		248,780	–
Registered voters/turnout		289,205	86.02
Nacionalista hold			
Source: Commission on Elections

== Surigao del Sur ==
=== 1st district ===
Incumbent Prospero Pichay Jr. of Lakas–CMD ran for a third term.

Pichay was defeated by former Department of Public Works and Highways undersecretary Romeo Momo, an independent. Noneng Momo (National Unity Party) also ran for representative.

Candidate	Party	Votes	%
Romeo Momo	Independent	106,907	50.76
Prospero Pichay Jr. (incumbent)	Lakas–CMD	97,783	46.43
Noneng Momo	National Unity Party	5,924	2.81
Total		210,614	100.00
Total votes		229,807	–
Registered voters/turnout		260,806	88.11
Independent gain from Lakas			
Source: Commission on Elections

=== 2nd district ===
Incumbent Johnny Pimentel of PDP–Laban ran for a third term.

Pimentel won re-election against Bislig councilor Edmund Estrella (Lakas–CMD).

Candidate	Party	Votes	%
Johnny Pimentel (incumbent)	PDP–Laban	110,852	75.93
Edmund Estrella	Lakas–CMD	35,136	24.07
Total		145,988	100.00
Total votes		164,067	–
Registered voters/turnout		188,264	87.15
PDP–Laban hold			
Source: Commission on Elections
