= Alan Uno Ecleo =

Filipino politician (born 1969)

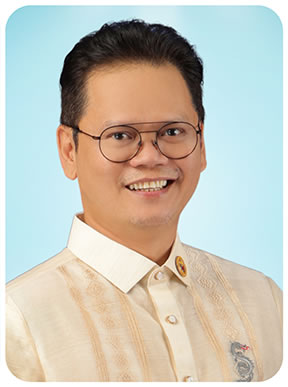
- Official portrait, 2022

Member of the House of Representatives from Dinagat Islands's at-large district
- In office June 30, 2019 – June 30, 2025
- Preceded by: Kaka Bag-ao
- Succeeded by: Kaka Bag-ao

Mayor of Basilisa
- In office June 30, 2016 – June 30, 2019
- Vice Mayor: Jacinto Daganasol
- Preceded by: Cesar Borja
- Succeeded by: Ozzy Reuben Ecleo
- In office June 30, 2010 – June 30, 2013
- Vice Mayor: Cesar Borja
- Preceded by: Floro Baltar Jr.
- Succeeded by: Cesar Borja

Personal details
- Born: Alan Uno Buray Ecleo; March 2, 1969 (age 57) Surigao City, Surigao del Norte, Philippines
- Party: Lakas (2009–2015; 2020–present)
- Other political affiliations: PDP–Laban (2018–2020); UNA (2015–2018)
- Parent(s): Ruben Ecleo Sr. (father); Glenda Ecleo (mother)
- Relatives: Ruben Ecleo Jr. (brother); Gwendolyn Ecleo (sister); Jade Ecleo (sister)
- Occupation: Politician

Alan Uno Buray Ecleo (born March 2, 1969), also known as Alan 1 Ecleo, is a Filipino politician. He served as representative for Dinagat Islands's at-large district at the House of Representatives of the Philippines from 2019 to 2025.

== Early years ==
Ecleo was born on March 2, 1969, in Surigao City to a prominent political family in Dinagat Islands. He is the son of Ruben Ecleo Sr. and Glenda Buray.

== Political career ==
=== Mayor of Basilisa ===
In 2010 elections, Ecleo was elected as mayor of Basilisa until 2013.

In 2016 elections, Ecleo returned as mayor of Basilisa until 2019.

=== House of Representatives ===
In 2019 elections, Ecleo represented the lone district of Dinagat Islands.

In February 2025, Ecleo was one of the 95 Lakas–CMD members who voted to impeach vice president Sara Duterte.

In 2025 elections, Ecleo lost to Kaka Bag-ao for re-election as representative for Dinagat Islands.

== Personal life ==
His brother, Ruben Jr., also a representative for Dinagat Islands from 2010 to 2012 and former leader of the Philippine Benevolent Missionaries Association. His sister, Gwendolyn and Jade, also a politician.

His twin brother, Allan II, served as mayor of San Jose from 2013 to 2019 and councilor since 2019.

== Electoral history ==
Electoral history of Alan Uno Ecleo
Year	Office	Party	Votes received				Result
Year	Office	Party	Total	%	P.	Swing	Result
2010	Mayor of Basilisa	Lakas–Kampi	7,597	—N/a	1st	—N/a	Won
2016	Mayor of Basilisa	UNA	8,024	—N/a	1st	—N/a	Won
2019	Representative (Dinagat Islands at-large)	PDP–Laban	26,746	—N/a	1st	—N/a	Won
2022	Representative (Dinagat Islands at-large)	Lakas	37,458	64.72%	1st	—N/a	Won
2025	Representative (Dinagat Islands at-large)	Lakas	30,347	45.09%	2nd	—N/a	Lost
