= List of Filipino politicians convicted of crimes =

The following is a list of Filipino politicians convicted of crimes in relation to their conduct while in office.

This excludes:

- People who are merely formally charged of crime/s they allegedly committed, who may or may not be under detention.
- Acquitted people
- Conviction of crimes committed while not in office.

The list however includes convicted people who were later pardoned of their crimes.

== List ==
=== Presidents ===
Name	Year	Party	Offence	Sentence	Notes	Reference
Joseph Estrada	2007	LAMMP	Plunder	Life imprisonment	See Trial of Joseph Estrada; Later pardoned	

=== Legislators ===
==== House of Representatives ====
Name	Year	Constituent	Party	Offence	Sentence	Notes	Reference
Romeo Jalosjos Sr.	1997	Zamboanga del Norte, 1st district	Lakas	Two counts of rape Six counts of child molestation	2 life sentences (rape); 90 years of imprisonment (Up to 15 years per each six charges)	Removed from his position in 2002 after his conviction was ruled in finality.	

=== Local executives ===
==== Regional governors ====
Name	Year	Office	Region	Party	Offence	Sentence	Notes	Reference
Zaldy Ampatuan	2019	Governor	Autonomous Region in Muslim Mindanao	Lakas–Kampi	Murder	40 years of jail	In relation to the Maguindanao massacre in 2009	
Imelda Marcos	2018	Governor	National Capital Region	KBL	Graft	42–77 years of jail (7–11 years per each seven charges)	For illegally funneling about $200 million to Swiss foundations in the 1970s; Marcos remains undetained	

==== Governors ====
Name	Year	Province	Party	Offence	Sentence	Notes	Reference
Sajid Islam Ampatuan	2022–23	Maguindanao		Malversion through falsification of public documents; Graft	160–164 years of jail		

==== Mayors ====
Name	Year	City/Municipality	Party	Offence	Sentence	Notes	Reference
Ruben Ecleo Jr.	2012	San Jose, Surigao del Norte (now Dinagat Islands)	Lakas	Graft	18 years	Removed as Dinagat Islands House of Representatives member in 2012 for this crime.	
