= Jade Ecleo =

Filipino politician

Vice Governor of Dinagat Islands
- Incumbent
- Assumed office June 30, 2025
- Governor: Nilo Demerey Jr.
- Preceded by: Benglen Ecleo
- In office June 30, 2010 – June 30, 2013
- Governor: Glenda Ecleo
- Preceded by: Elvis dela Merced
- Succeeded by: Benglen Ecleo

Governor of Dinagat Islands
- In office July 1, 2007 – June 30, 2010; Acting governor from January 26, 2007 – July 1, 2007
- Vice Governor: Elvis dela Merced
- Preceded by: Office established
- Succeeded by: Glenda Ecleo

Personal details
- Born: Geraldine Buray Ecleo; October 5, 1970 (age 56) Surigao City, Surigao del Norte, Philippines
- Party: PFP (2024–present)
- Other political affiliations: Liberal (2012–2015; 2021–2024); UNA (2015–2021); Independent (2009–2012); Lakas (2007–2009)

Geraldine "Jade" Buray Ecleo-Villaroman (born October 5, 1970) is a Filipina politician and part-time actress and singer.

Ecleo served as the first governor of the Philippine province of Dinagat Islands when it was established in 2006. She served as governor from July 1, 2007, until 2010 and was succeeded by her mother, Glenda B. Ecleo. Ecleo served as vice-governor to her mother from July 1, 2010, until 2013 and was defeated in the 2013 elections for the governor post by her mother, who was re-elected for a second term. In the 2016 general elections, she ran for a congressional seat to represent the lone district of Dinagat Islands but was defeated by the incumbent congresswoman, Kaka Bag-ao.

Ecleo is the daughter of Ruben Ecleo, founder of the Philippine Benevolent Missionaries Association, and the sister of Gwendolyn Ecleo and controversial religious politician Ruben Ecleo Jr.

In 2022, Ecleo ran under the Liberal Party for Dinagat Islands representative but lost to her brother Alan.

This 2025 elections, Ecleo ran for vice governor of Dinagat Islands under the Partido Federal ng Pilipinas against her brother Benglen.
