= Retiring and term-limited incumbents in the 2013 Philippine House of Representatives elections =

These are term limited and retiring members of the House of Representatives of the Philippines during the 15th Congress of the Philippines. Term limited members are prohibited from running in the 2013 elections; they may run for any other positions, or may wait until the 2016 elections.

== Liberal Party incumbents ==
1. Aklan's lone district: Florencio Miraflores: ran and won as Governor of Aklan
2. Cavite's 3rd district: Erineo Maliksi, ran and lost in the Gubernatorial race in Cavite to incumbent Juanito Victor Remulla, Jr. (Lakas-CMD)
3. Cebu City's 1st district: Rachel Del Mar, not running to give way to her father
4. Cebu City's 2nd district: Tomas Osmeña, ran and lost in the mayoralty race in Cebu City to incumbent Mike Rama (United Nationalist Alliance)
5. Laguna's 2nd district: Justin Marc Chipeco: Term-limited in 2013, ran and won as Mayor of Calamba under the Nacionalista Party
6. Negros Oriental's 1st district: Jocelyn Limkaichong, ran and lost in the Gubernatorial race in Negros Oriental to incumbent Roel Degamo (PDP-Laban)
7. Oriental Mindoro's 1st district: Rodolfo Valencia: Term-limited in 2013
8. Pangasinan's 3rd district: Rachel Arenas: backed out for her mother, Rosemarie, who is running unopposed
9. Parañaque's 1st district: Edwin Olivarez, ran and won as Mayor of Parañaque
10. Parañaque's 2nd district: Roilo Golez: Term-limited in 2013
11. Quezon's 2nd district: Irvin Alcala, ran and lost in the Gubernatorial race in Quezon to incumbent David Suarez (NUP)
12. Quezon's 4th district: Lorenzo Tañada III: Term-limited in 2013
13. Taguig City's lone district: Sigfrido Tinga
14. Zamboanga City's 1st district: Ma. Isabelle Climaco, ran and won as Mayor of Zamboanga City

== Lakas incumbents ==
1. Bulacan's 2nd district: Pedro Pancho: Term-limited in 2013
2. Lapu-Lapu City's lone district: Arturo Radaza, not running for medical reasons
3. Iloilo's 1st district: Janette Garin: Term-limited in 2013
4. Maguindanao's 2nd district: Simeon Datumanong: Term-limited in 2013
5. Lanao del Norte's 2nd district: Fatima Aliah Dimaporo, not running to give way to her father Abdullah Dimaporo
6. Masbate's 1st district: Antonio Kho, ran and lost in the Gubernatorial race in Masbate to incumbent Rizalina Lanetee (NPC)
7. Negros Occidental's 2nd district: Alfredo Marañon III: Term-limited in 2013, ran and won as Mayor of Sagay City
8. Occidental Mindoro's lone district: Amelita Villarosa: Term-limited in 2013, ran and lost in the Gubernatorial race in Occidenta Mindoro to incumbent Vice Governor Mario Gene Mendiola (Liberal)
9. Pampanga's 1st district: Carmelo Lazatin, ran and lost in the mayoralty race in Angeles City to incumbent Edgardo Pamintuan (PAK)
10. Quezon's 3rd district: Danilo Suarez: Term-limited in 2013
11. Tawi-Tawi's lone district: Nur Jaafar: Term-limited in 2013, ran and lost in the Gubernatorial race in Tawi-Tawi under NPC to Nurbert Sahali (Liberal)
12. Zamboanga del Norte's 2nd district: Cesar Jalosjos: Term-limited in 2013 Term-limited in 2013, ran and lost in the Gubernatorial race in Zamboanga del Norte under NP to Berto Uy (Liberal)

== Laban ng Demokratikong Pilipino incumbent ==
1. Aurora's lone district: Juan Edgardo Angara: Term-limited in 2013, Ran and won in the Senatorial race (6th place, first 12 are elected).

== Nacionalista Party incumbents ==
1. Caloocan's 1st district: Oscar Malapitan: Term-limited in 2013, ran and won as Mayor of Caloocan
2. Cavite's 7th district: Jesus Crispin Remulla: Term-limited in 2013, ran and lost in the mayoralty race in Tagaytay to Agnes Tolentino (Liberal)
3. Davao del Sur's 1st district: Marc Douglas Cagas IV, ran and lost in the Gubernatorial race in Davao del Sur to Claude Bautista (NPC)
4. Ilocos Sur's 1st district: Ryan Luis V. Singson, ran and won as Governor of Ilocos Sur
5. Iloilo's 4th district: Ferjenel Biron: Term-limited in 2013, ran and lost in the Gubernatorial race in Iloilo to incumbent Arthur Defensor, Sr. (Liberal)
6. Misamis Oriental's 2nd district: Yevgeny Vincent Emano, ran and won as Governor of Misamis Oriental
7. Quezon City's 1st district: Vincent Crisologo: Term-limited in 2013
8. Zamboanga City's 2nd district: Erico Basilio Fabian: Term-limited in 2013, ran and lost in the mayoralty race in Zamboanga City to incumbent congresswoman Maria Isabelle Climaco (Liberal)
9. Zamboanga Sibugay's 1st district: Jonathan Yambao, not running to give way to his mother Belma Cabilao

== National Unity Party incumbents ==
1. Bataan's 2nd district: Albert Garcia: Term-limited in 2013, ran and won as Governor of Bataan
2. Camarines Norte's 1st district: Renato Unico, Jr., ran and lost in the Gubernatorial race in Camarines Norte to incumbent Edgardo Tallado (Liberal)
3. Cavite's 6th district: Antonio Ferrer, ran and won as Mayor of General Trias
4. Cebu's 3rd district: Pablo John Garcia, ran and lost in the Gubernatorial race in Cebu to Hilario Davide III (Liberal)
5. Masbate's 1st district: Narciso Bravo: Term-limited in 2013, ran and won as Mayor of San Fernando
6. Nueva Ecija's 4th district: Rodolfo Antonino: Term-limited in 2013
7. Palawan's 1st district: Antonio Alvarez: Term-limited in 2013
8. Southern Leyte's lone district: Roger Mercado: Term-limited in 2013, ran and won as Governor of Southern Leyte

== Nationalist People's Coalition incumbents ==
1. Cagayan's 1st district: Juan C."Jack" Enrile Jr., ran and lost in the Senatorial race (14th place, first 12 are elected), replaced by his wife Salvacion Santiago-Ponce Enrile
2. Camarines Sur's 3rd district: Luis Villafuerte, Sr.: Term-limited in 2013, ran and lost in the Gubernatorial race in Camarines Sur to Miguel Villafuerte (NP)
3. Camarines Sur's 4th district: Arnulfo Fuentebella: Term-limited in 2013, replaced by his son Felix William Fuentebella
4. Cebu's 5th district: Ramon Durano VI: Term-limited in 2013, ran and won as Vice Mayor of Danao City
5. Isabela's 1st district: Rodolfo Albano, Jr., ran and won as Mayor of Cabagan
6. Laguna's 4th district: Edgar San Luis, ran and lost in the Gubernatorial race in Laguna under Liberal Party to incumbent Jeorge "ER" Ejercito Estregan (UNA)
7. Nueva Ecija's 1st district: Josefina Joson, ran and lost in the Gubernatorial race in Nueva Ecija to incumbent Aurelio Umali (Liberal)
8. South Cotabato's 2nd district: Daisy Avance-Fuentes, ran and won as governor of South Cotabato
9. Valenzuela's 1st district: Rexlon Gatchalian, ran and won as Mayor of Valenzuela City

== United Nationalist Alliance incumbent ==
1. Zambales's 1st district: Milagros Magsaysay: Term-limited in 2013, ran and lost in the Senatorial race (21st place, first 12 are elected)
2. San Juan City's lone district: Joseph Victor Ejercito, Ran and won in the Senatorial race (10th place, first 12 are elected)

== Independent incumbent ==
1. Albay's 1st district: Edcel Lagman: Term-limited in 2013
2. Batangas's 2nd district: Hermilando Mandanas: Term-limited in 2013

== Party-list incumbents ==
1. Akbayan: Arlene Bag-ao: ran and won as congresswoman of Dinagat Islands
2. An Waray: Florencio Noel: Term-limited in 2013, ran and lost in the mayoralty race in Tacloban City to incumbent Alfred Romualdez (Nacionalista)
3. Ang Galing Pinoy: Mikey Arroyo: Term-limited in 2013
4. Bayan Muna: Teodoro Casiño: Term-limited in 2013, ran and lost in the Senatorial race

== Deceased ==
1. Bohol 2nd district: Erico Aumentado (NPC), died on December 25, 2012. Aumentado's son was his substitute candidate and won in the general election.
2. Camiguin lone district: Pedro Romualdo (NPC), died on April 24, 2013.
3. Sorsogon 1st district: Salvador Escudero III (Liberal), died on August 13, 2012. Escudero's wife ran and won in the general election.

== Left or removed from office ==
1. Cavite 1st district: Joseph Emilio Abaya (Liberal), resigned on October 16, 2012. Abaya's brother ran and won in the general election.
2. Dinagat Islands lone district: Ruben Ecleo (Lakas), dropped from the rolls on May 31, 2012. Ecleo's sister ran and lost in the general election.
