= Legislative districts of Dinagat Islands =

Philippine district representing Dinagat Islands.

The legislative districts of Dinagat Islands are the representations of the province of Dinagat Islands in the Congress of the Philippines. The province is currently represented in the lower house of the Congress through its lone congressional district.

== History ==
Prior to gaining separate representation, areas now under the jurisdiction of Dinagat Islands were initially represented under the former province of Surigao (1907–1961), Region X (1978–1984) and Surigao del Norte (1961–1972; 1984–2007).

The passage of Republic Act No. 9355 on October 2, 2006 and its subsequent ratification by plebiscite three months later separated seven municipalities from Surigao del Norte's first congressional district to form the new province of Dinagat Islands. The new province first elected its separate representative in the 2007 elections.

Despite Dinagat Islands being nullified as a province by the Supreme Court of the Philippines on February 11, 2010 the decision was not yet rendered final and executory before the May 10, 2010 elections; therefore the Commission on Elections still organized the elections for Dinagat Islands' congressional representative along with its provincial officials. Even after the Supreme Court rendered its original decision final and executory on May 18, 2010, the representatives of the reconfigured first district of Surigao del Norte and the lone district of Dinagat Islands continued to represent their own constituencies.

After the Supreme Court reversed its previous ruling on April 12, 2011, and subsequently upheld with finality the constitutionality of R.A. 9355 and the creation of Dinagat Islands as a province through an Entry of Judgment on October 24, 2012, the separation of Dinagat Islands from Surigao del Norte's first district became permanent.

== Lone District ==
- Population (2015): 127,152

Period	Representative
14th Congress; 2007–2010	Glenda B. Ecleo
15th Congress; 2010–2013	Ruben B. Ecleo, Jr. (Note: Name deleted from House of Representatives list of members on May 22, 2012 over conviction of parricide; seat remained officially vacant until the end of the 15th Congress.)
15th Congress; 2010–2013	vacant (Note: Arlene "Kaka" Bag-ao was appointed congressional caretaker for the district in October 2012 while concurrently serving as Akbayan party-list representative until the end of the 15th Congress.)
16th Congress; 2013–2016	Arlene J. Bag-ao
17th Congress; 2016–2019	Arlene J. Bag-ao
18th Congress; 2019–2022	Alan Uno B. Ecleo
19th Congress; 2022–2025	Alan Uno B. Ecleo
20th Congress; 2025–present	Arlene J. Bag-ao

== See also ==
- Legislative district of Surigao
- Legislative districts of Surigao del Norte
