= Adela Serra-Ty =

Filipino politician

Adela Serra-Ty was a Filipino politician who served as the former Governor of Surigao del Sur.

== Legacy ==
In April 23, 1992, the Surigao del Sur Provincial Hospital was renamed through Republic Act 7433 to Adela Serra Ty Memorial Hospital in her honor.
