= Philippine House Special Committee on Strategic Intelligence =

Special committee of the House of Representatives of the Philippines

Special Committee on Strategic Intelligence
- 20th Congress

History
- New session started: To convene on July 28, 2025

Leadership
- Chairman: Vacant
- Minority Leader: Vacant

Website
- Special Committee on Strategic Intelligence

The Philippine House Special Committee on Strategic Intelligence is a special committee of the Philippine House of Representatives.

== Jurisdiction ==
As prescribed by House Rules, the committee's jurisdiction is on strategic intelligence initiatives, activities, and programs of the Philippine government which includes, but not limited to the following:

- Counter-intelligence
- Counter-terrorism
- Economic intelligence
- Foreign intelligence

== Members, 20th Congress ==
As of June 30, 2025, all committee membership positions are vacant until the House convenes for its first regular session on July 28.

== Historical membership rosters ==
=== 18th Congress ===
| Position | Members | Party | Province/City | District |
|---|---|---|---|---|
| Chairperson | Johnny Pimentel | PDP–Laban | Surigao del Sur | 2nd |
| Vice Chairpersons | Alfred Vargas | PDP–Laban | Quezon City | 5th |
| Vice Chairpersons | Jose Antonio Sy-Alvarado | NUP | Bulacan | 1st |
| Vice Chairpersons | Ian Paul Dy | NPC | Isabela | 3rd |
| Members for the Majority | Narciso Bravo Jr. | NUP | Masbate | 1st |
| Members for the Majority | Joseph Sto. Niño Bernos | Nacionalista | Abra | Lone |
| Members for the Majority | Raul Tupas | Nacionalista | Iloilo | 5th |
| Members for the Majority | Jose Tejada | Nacionalista | Cotabato | 3rd |
| Members for the Majority | Presley De Jesus | PHILRECA | Party-list | |
| Members for the Majority | Jorge Antonio Bustos | PATROL | Party-list | |
| Members for the Majority | Lorenz Defensor | PDP–Laban | Iloilo | 3rd |
| Members for the Minority | Godofredo Guya | RECOBODA | Party-list | |

==== Chairperson ====
- Fredenil Castro (Capiz–2nd, Lakas) March 10, 2020 – December 7, 2020

== See also ==
- House of Representatives of the Philippines
- List of Philippine House of Representatives committees
- National Intelligence Coordinating Agency
