= Vicente Pimentel Jr. =

Filipino politician (1947–2018)

The Honorable Vicente T. Pimentel Jr.
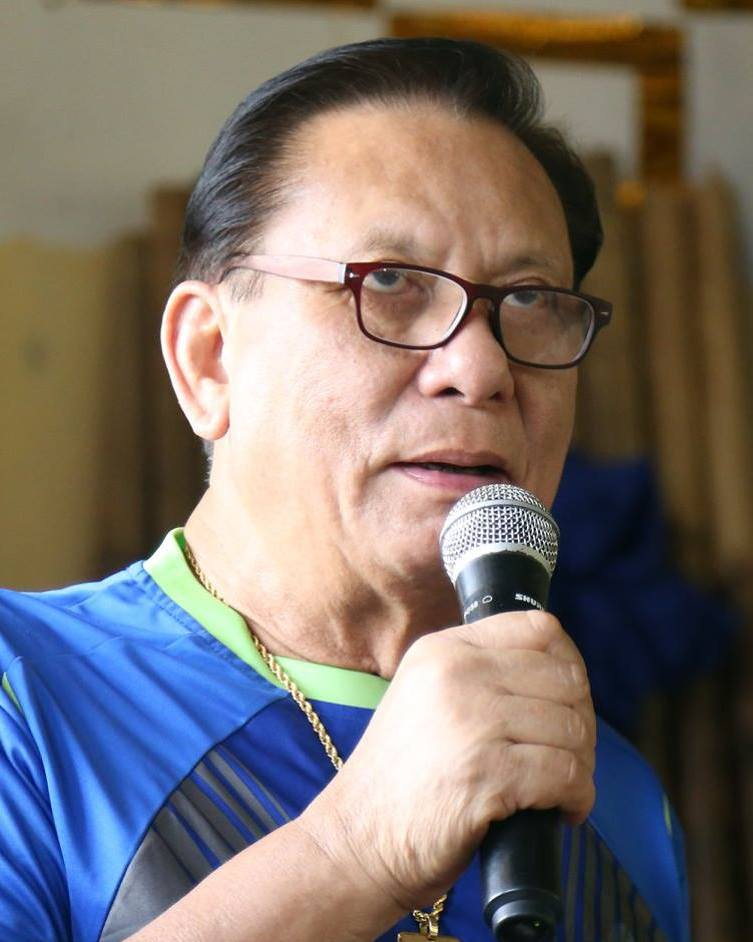

Governor of Surigao del Sur
- In office June 30, 2016 – December 25, 2018
- Vice Governor: Manuel Alameda
- Preceded by: Johnny Pimentel
- Succeeded by: Manuel Alameda
- In office June 30, 2001 – June 30, 2010
- Vice Governor: Librado C. Navarro
- Preceded by: Primo Murillo
- Succeeded by: Johnny Pimentel

Mayor of Carrascal
- In office June 30, 2010 – June 30, 2016
- Preceded by: Alfred Arreza
- Succeeded by: Vicente Pimentel III
- In office June 30, 1992 – June 30, 2001

Personal details
- Born: Vicente Ty Pimentel, Jr. March 12, 1947
- Died: December 25, 2018 (aged 71) Surigao del Sur
- Party: PDP-Laban (2018)
- Other political affiliations: Liberal (2012–2018); Lakas (until 2012)

Vicente Ty Pimentel Jr. (March 12, 1947 – December 25, 2018), also known as BB Boy Pimentel or simply BB Pimentel, was a Filipino politician. He served as the governor of Surigao del Sur province for three non-consecutive terms from 2001 until 2010 and again from 2016 until his death in office on December 25, 2018.

Pimentel began his professional career in politics as a barangay captain in Tandag, the capital of Surigao del Sur. He served as the mayor of Carrascal, Surigao del Sur, from 1992 until 2001 and again from 2010 to 2016. Pimentel then served as governor of Surigao del Sur from 2016 until his death in 2018.

In 2018, Pimentel filed to run for re-election as governor in the forthcoming 2019 Philippine general election in May 2019. However, Pimentel later withdrew from his re-election race due to deteriorating health. His younger brother, Tandag Mayor Alexander Pimentel, replaced him as the new gubernatorial candidate.

Governor Pimentel was hospitalized in Manila in December 2018, but checked himself out of the hospital on December 24 to return home to Surigao del Sur for Christmas. He died in his sleep the next day on December 25, 2018, at his home in Surigao del Sur at the age of 71.
