= Ruben Ecleo Sr. =

Filipino cult leader (1934–1987)

Ruben Ecleo
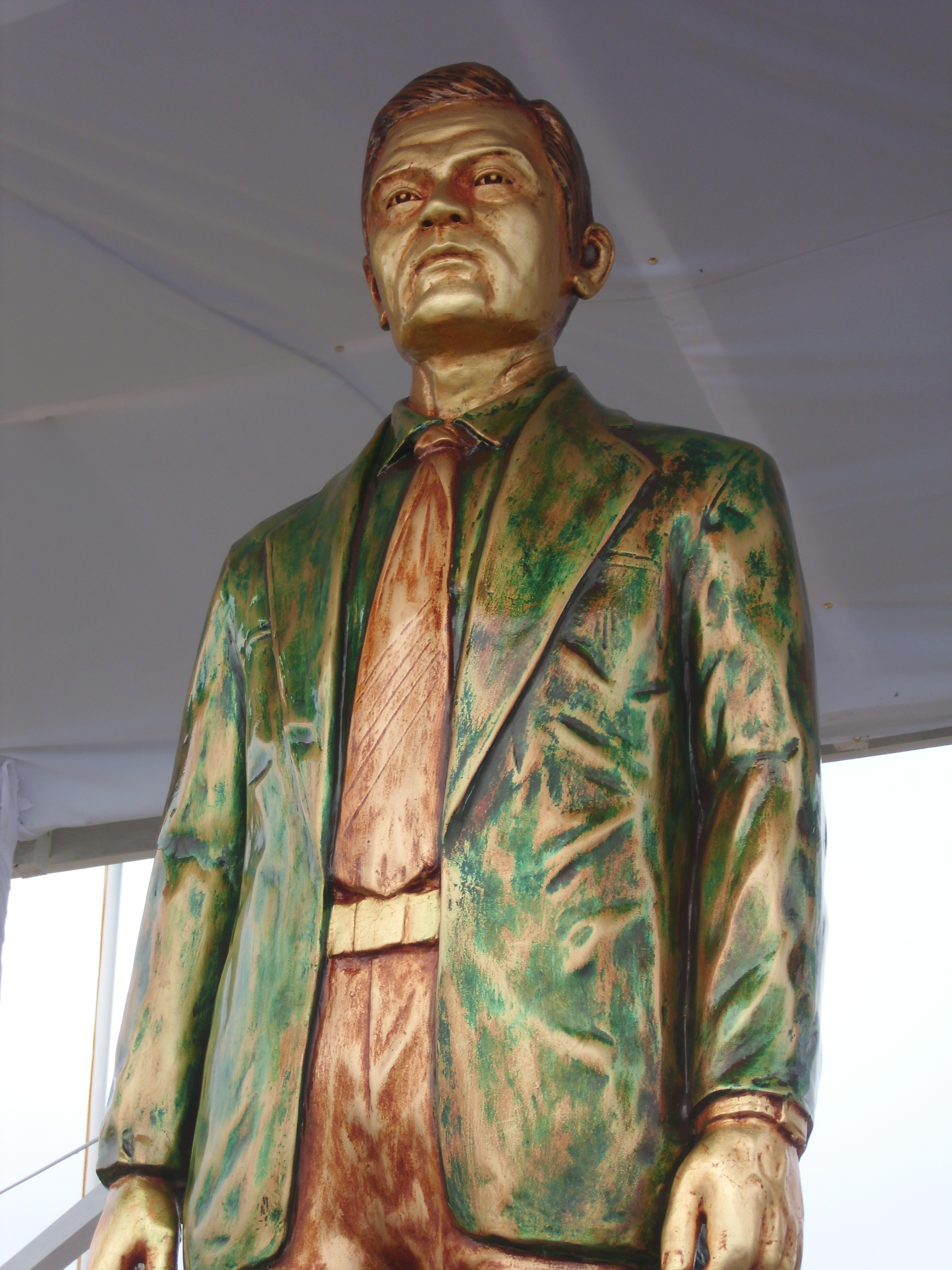
- Title: Supreme President and Founder / Divine Master

Personal life
- Born: Ruben Edera Ecleo; December 9, 1934 Dinagat, Surigao, Philippine Commonwealth
- Died: December 20, 1987 (aged 53)
- Spouse: Glenda Buray (m. 1955)
- Children: 8, including Ruben Jr., Alan Uno, Jade and Gwendolyn
- Known for: Founder of Philippine Benevolent Missionaries Association

Religious life
- Religion: Independent Christian

Mayor of Dinagat, Surigao del Norte
- In office 1963–1987

Ruben Edera Ecleo Sr. (December 9, 1934 – December 20, 1987) was a Filipino religious leader and politician who founded the Philippine Benevolent Missionaries Association in 1965, and the mayor of the municipality of Dinagat, Surigao del Norte from 1963 up to 1987.

== Early life ==
Ruben Ecleo Sr. was born on December 9, 1934, in Cabilan island in Dinagat, Surigao (now part of the Dinagat Islands province). He was baptized to the Philippine Independent Church at age one in the neighboring town of Surigao. His family moved the western portion of Dinagat island prior to 1941 in an area in Sitio Puyange which is now part of San Jose municipality.

== Ministry work ==
Ecleo reportedly started his ministerial work at age eleven. He went to the United States in 1952 to undergo a months-long survey study tour before returning to the Philippines in 1953. He did mission work for the rest of the 1950s to the early 1960s, preaching in areas such as Davao, Bukidnon, Leyte, and Samar. It was around this time that his followers believe that his healing powers surfaced. There were claims that he was able to cure illnesses and even raise people from the dead. In the early 1960s, he was able to amass his first followers who became known as the "First Thirteen" and he began using the title "Divine Master". He would formally establish the Philippine Benevolent Missionaries Association (PBMA) in 1965. The group's belief is described as a mixture of Christian, Buddhism, Hinduism, Judaism and Akashic doctrines. He also held the title Supreme President within the PBMA.

His son, Ruben Jr. succeeded him as leader of the PBMA after his death. A PBMA primer says that the group believes that Ecleo Sr. "reappeared" in the body of his successor son.

== Political career ==
Ecleo was elected as Mayor of Dinagat, Surigao del Norte in 1963. He would hold the position until his death in 1987.

== Death ==
Ecleo died on December 20, 1987.

== Personal life ==
Ecleo was married to Glenda Buray, who was a former member of the Surigao del Norte Provincial Board from and a House of Representatives member representing the 1st district of the same province He married Buray in 1955, and they had eight children. He had also a relationship with other women who were known to be his "spiritual wives" including Reyneria Borja, with whom he had two children, including Ruben Al.
