= Governor of Surigao del Sur =

Local chief executive

Provincial Governor of Surigao del Sur
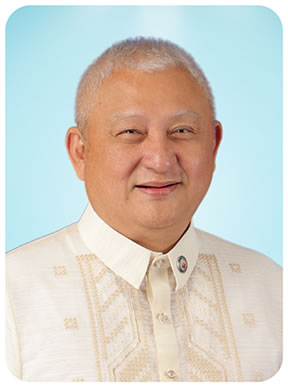
- Incumbent; Johnny Pimentel since June 30, 2025
- Appointer: Elected via popular vote
- Term length: 3 years
- Inaugural holder: Recaredo B. Castillo
- Formation: September 18, 1960

The governor of Surigao del Sur (Filipino: Punong Panlalawigan ng Surigao del Sur), is the chief executive of the provincial government of Surigao del Sur.

== Provincial Governors ==
No.	Image	Governor	Term
1		Recaredo B. Castillo	September 18, 1960–December 31, 1963
2		Adela Serra-Ty	January 1, 1964–December 31, 1967
(1)		Recaredo B. Castillo	January 1, 1968–December 31, 1971
3		Gregorio P. Murillo	January 1, 1972–October 23, 1985
4		Felicidad T. Pimentel	October 23, 1985-November 30, 1987
*		Alexander T. Pimentel	December 1, 1987–February 1, 1988
5		Salvacion C. Cejoco	February 2, 1988–June 30, 1992
6		Primo T. Murillo	June 30, 1992–June 30, 2001
7		Vicente T. Pimentel Jr.	June 30, 2001–June 30, 2010
8		Johnny T. Pimentel	June 30, 2010–June 30, 2016
(7)		Vicente T. Pimentel Jr.	June 30, 2016–December 25, 2018
*		Manuel O. Alameda Sr.	December 25, 2018–June 30, 2019
9		Alexander T. Pimentel	June 30, 2019–June 30, 2025
(8)		Johnny T. Pimentel	June 30, 2025–present
