= Alexander Pimentel =

Filipino politician

Alexander T. Pimentel
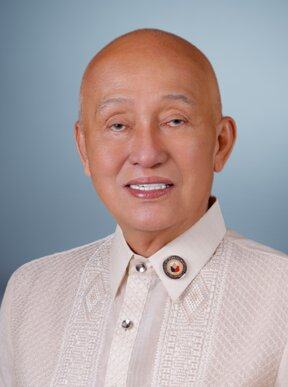
- Official portrait, 2025

Member of the Philippine House of Representatives from Surigao del Sur's 2nd District
- Incumbent
- Assumed office June 30, 2025
- Preceded by: Johnny Pimentel

Governor of Surigao del Sur
- In office June 30, 2019 – June 30, 2025
- Vice Governor: Librado C. Navarro (2019–2022); Manuel Alameda (2022–2025)
- Preceded by: Manuel Alameda
- Succeeded by: Johnny Pimentel
- Acting
- In office December 1, 1987 – February 1, 1988
- Preceded by: Felicidad Pimentel
- Succeeded by: Salvacion Cejoco

Mayor of Tandag
- In office June 30, 2016 – June 30, 2019
- Preceded by: Roxanne C. Pimentel
- Succeeded by: Roxanne C. Pimentel
- In office June 30, 2004 – June 30, 2013
- Preceded by: Mary Elizabeth Delgado
- Succeeded by: Roxanne C. Pimentel

Personal details
- Born: Alexander Ty Pimentel; July 9, 1953 (age 73) Davao City, Davao, Philippines
- Party: PFP (2024–present)
- Other political affiliations: PDP (2018–2024); Liberal (2012–2018); Lakas (until 2012)
- Relations: Vicente Pimentel Jr. (brother)

Alexander "Ayec" Pimentel (born July 9, 1953) is a Filipino politician from the province of Surigao del Sur in the Philippines. He served as Governor of Surigao del Sur from 1987 to 1988 and from 2019 to 2025. He was also the Mayor of Tandag of the same province from 2004 to 2013 and from 2016 to 2019.

He is the brother of politicians Vicente Pimentel Jr. and Johnny Pimentel.

On September 23, 2020, it was announced that Pimentel tested positive for COVID-19. He was hospitalized on September 28 and was exhibiting mild symptoms.

In 2025, Pimentel was elected to the House of Representatives representing Surigao del Sur's 2nd district.
