= Johnny Pimentel =

Filipino politician

Johnny T. Pimentel
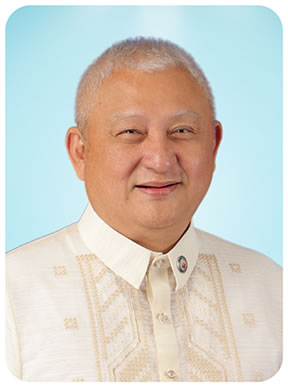
- Pimentel during the 19th Congress

Governor of Surigao del Sur
- Incumbent
- Assumed office June 30, 2025
- Vice Governor: Manuel Alameda
- Preceded by: Alexander Pimentel
- In office June 30, 2010 – June 30, 2016
- Vice Governor: Manuel Alameda
- Preceded by: Vicente Pimentel Jr.
- Succeeded by: Vicente Pimentel Jr.

Deputy Speaker of the House of Representatives
- In office July 22, 2019 – December 7, 2020
- House Speaker: Alan Peter Cayetano; Lord Allan Velasco

Member of the Philippine House of Representatives from Surigao del Sur's 2nd District
- In office June 30, 2016 – June 30, 2025
- Preceded by: Florencio C. Garay

Vice Governor of Surigao del Sur
- In office June 30, 1995 – June 30, 1998
- Governor: Primo Murillo

Personal details
- Born: Johnny Ty Pimentel; March 29, 1956 (age 70) Tandag, Surigao, Philippines
- Party: NUP (2023–present)
- Other political affiliations: PDP (2018–2023); Liberal (2012–2018); Lakas–CMD (2001–2012); LAMMP (1998–2001)
- Spouse: Rosalinda Cabreros Cruz
- Children: 4
- Education: Ateneo de Manila University (BS)

Johnny Ty Pimentel (born March 29, 1956) is a Filipino politician who served in the House of Representatives of the Philippines as the representative of Surigao del Sur's 2nd district from 2016 to 2025. He previously served as a deputy speaker of the House from 2019 to 2020. He also served as vice governor of Surigao del Sur from 1995 to 1998 and later governor from 2010 to 2016.

== Early life and education ==
Pimentel was born on March 29, 1956, in Tandag, Surigao to Vicente Pimentel Sr., the governor of Surigao from 1946 to 1951, and Felicidad Ty. His siblings include Vicente Pimentel Jr. and Alexander Pimentel.

He graduated from Ateneo de Manila University with a Bachelor of Science in Management degree.

== Political career ==
Pimentel first entered politics in 1995 when he became the vice governor of Surigao del Sur, occupying the position until 1998. He ran for governor in the 1998 local elections under the Laban ng Makabayang Masang Pilipino party but lost to incumbent Primo Murillo. From 2001 to 2010, during the gubernatorial term of his brother, Vicente Pimentel Jr., he served as the provincial administrator.

From 2010 to 2016, Pimentel served as governor of Surigao del Sur. In the 2010 gubernatorial elections, he ran under the Lakas-Kampi-CMD party. He then ran under the Liberal Party (LP) during the 2013 elections. During his first two years in office, he helped facilitate the release of people captured by the New People's Army including two mayors of Lingig, Roberto Luna Jr. who was captured in May 2010 and Henry Dano who was captured in August 2011.

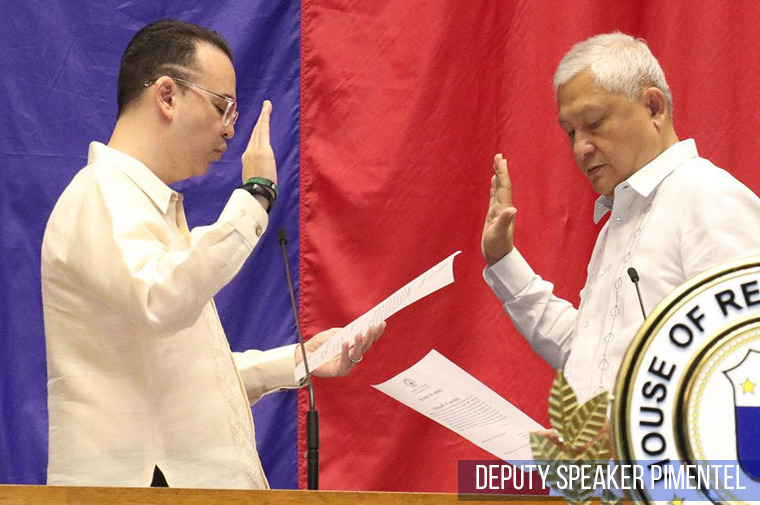
Pimentel taking his oath of office as Deputy House Speaker on July 27, 2019

In 2016, Pimentel, running as the LP candidate, won a seat at the House of Representatives. He officially transferred his voter's registration to Bislig. He secured a second term in 2019 in which he ran under the ruling PDP–Laban party. In July 2019, he was elected Deputy House Speaker and was the designated PDP–Laban spokesperson in the lower house. On December 7, 2020, he was ousted as deputy speaker but then became the chairman of the House Special Committee on Strategic Intelligence, a post formerly occupied by Representative Fredenil Castro of Capiz's 2nd District.

Pimentel was elected governor in 2025.

== Personal life ==
Pimentel is married to Rosalinda Cabreros Cruz. They have four children.

On July 27, 2020, Pimentel announced that he tested positive for COVID-19. This was after he underwent RT-PCR testing as part of the health protocols instituted for the 5th State of the Nation Address of President Rodrigo Duterte. He eventually recovered and received his negative swab test results on August 27.

Pimentel was the Grand Master of the Most Worshipful Grand Lodge of Free and Accepted Masons of the Philippines from 2022 to 2023.
