= Glenda Ecleo =

Filipino politician (1937–2024)

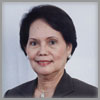
- Official portrait, 2004

Governor of Dinagat Islands
- In office June 30, 2010 – June 30, 2019
- Vice Governor: Jade Ecleo (2010–2013); Benglen Ecleo (2013–2019)
- Preceded by: Jade Ecleo
- Succeeded by: Kaka Bag-ao

Member of the Philippine House of Representatives from Dinagat Islands' Lone District
- In office June 30, 2007 – June 30, 2010
- Preceded by: District established
- Succeeded by: Ruben Ecleo Jr.

Member of the Philippine House of Representatives from Surigao del Norte' First District
- In office June 30, 2001 – June 30, 2007
- Preceded by: Constantino Navarro Jr.
- Succeeded by: Francisco Matugas
- In office June 30, 1987 – June 30, 1995
- Preceded by: Office established
- Succeeded by: Constantino Navarro Jr.

Personal details
- Born: Glenda Oliveros Buray; May 10, 1937 Iligan, Lanao, Philippine Commonwealth
- Died: August 27, 2024 (aged 87)
- Party: UNA (2015–2024)
- Other political affiliations: Nacionalista (2012–2015); Lakas (1991–2012); UNIDO (1987–1988)
- Spouse: Ruben Ecleo Sr. (m. 1955; died 1987)
- Children: 8 (inc. Ruben Jr., Alan Uno, Jade, Gwendolyn)
- Education: University of the Visayas (BS); Cebu State College (ED.D.)

Glenda Oliveros Buray Ecleo (March 10, 1937 – August 27, 2024) was a Filipino politician. She authored the charter of the province of Dinagat Islands which was established in 2006 and administered it as its governor from 2010 to 2019.

== Political career ==
Ecleo served as representative of Surigao del Norte's 1st district in the House of Representatives from 1987 to 1995, and 2001 to 2007. She authored Republic Act 9355, the charter of Dinagat Islands, a province created from Surigao del Norte in 2006.

Upon creation of the province, Ecleo served as the de facto representative of Dinagat Islands in the lower house, until she was elected as Dinagat Island's lone district's first ever representative in 2007. She ran unopposed for the tenure which lasted 2010.

She was governor of Dinagat Islands from 2010 to 2019. In the 2013 election, Ecleo was re-elected with her daughter Jade challenging her position as governor.

The Commission on Elections started a preliminary investigation in 2014, against Ecleo for possible overspending for her campaigning in the 2010 election. In 2021, Comelec recommended filing of criminal charges against Ecleo. However this was reversed in 2023 by the Supreme Court for violating Ecleo's constitutional right to speedy disposition of the case.

== Death ==
Ecleo died on August 27, 2024. She suffered from a blood infection.

== Personal life ==
Glenda was a matriarch of the Ecleo political family of Dinagat Islands who has held various electoral positions in the province. Her husband was Ruben Ecleo Sr. is the founder of the religious organization Philippine Benevolent Missionaries Association. They married in 1955 and had eight children.

Glenda was also president of the Don Jose Ecleo Memorial College.
