= Dinagat Islands's at-large congressional district =

Legislative district of the Philippines

- Constituency for the House of Representatives of the Philippines
- Location of Dinagat Islands within the Philippines
- Province: Dinagat Islands
- Region: Caraga
- Population: 128,117 (2020)
- Electorate: 81,673 (2025)
- Area: 1,036.34 km^{2} (400.13 sq mi)

Current constituency
- Created: 2006
- Representative: Kaka Bag-ao
- Political party: Liberal
- Congressional bloc: Minority

Dinagat Islands's at-large congressional district is the sole congressional district of the Philippines in the province of Dinagat Islands. It was created ahead of the 2007 Philippine House of Representatives elections, following the separation of the islands from Surigao del Norte in 2006. The province has been electing a single representative provincewide at-large to the House of Representatives from the 14th Congress onwards. It is currently represented in the 20th Congress by Kaka Bag-ao of the Liberal Party.

== Representation history ==
#	Image	Member	Term of office		Congress	Party	Electoral history
#	Image	Member	Start	End	Congress	Party	Electoral history
=== Dinagat Islands's at-large district for the House of Representatives of the Philippines ===
District created December 2, 2006.
1		Glenda Ecleo	June 30, 2007	June 30, 2010	14th	Lakas	Redistricted from Surigao del Norte's 1st district and re-elected in 2007.
2		Ruben Ecleo Jr.	June 30, 2010	May 22, 2012	15th	Lakas	Elected in 2010. Removed from office due to criminal conviction.
—	vacant		May 22, 2012	June 30, 2013	15th	–	No special election held to fill vacancy.
3		Kaka Bag-ao	June 30, 2013	June 30, 2019	16th	Liberal	Elected in 2013.
3		Kaka Bag-ao	June 30, 2013	June 30, 2019	17th	Liberal	Re-elected in 2016.
4		Alan B. Ecleo	June 30, 2019	June 30, 2025	18th	PDP-Laban	Elected in 2019.
4		Alan B. Ecleo	June 30, 2019	June 30, 2025	19th	Lakas	Re-elected in 2022.
(3)		Kaka Bag-ao	June 30, 2025	Incumbent	20th	Liberal	Elected in 2025.

== Election results ==
=== 2025 ===
2025 Philippine House of Representatives elections in Dinagat Islands' at-large district
Party	Candidate	Votes	%
Liberal	Kaka Bag-ao	36,958	54.91%
Lakas	Alan Uno Ecleo	30,347	45.09%
Total votes		67,305	100%
Liberal gain from Lakas			

=== 2022 ===
2022 Philippine House of Representatives elections in Dinagat Islands' at-large district
Party	Candidate	Votes	%
Lakas	Alan Uno Ecleo	37,458	64.72%
Liberal	Jade Ecleo	20,415	35.28%
Total votes		66,558	100%
Lakas hold			

=== 2019 ===
2019 Philippine House of Representatives elections in Dinagat Islands' at-large district
Party	Candidate	Votes	%
PDP–Laban	Alan Uno Ecleo	26,746	50.46%
Liberal	Ann Pinat	26,258	49.54%
Total votes		53,004	100%
PDP–Laban gain from Liberal			

=== 2016 ===
2016 Philippine House of Representatives elections in Dinagat Islands' at-large district
Party	Candidate	Votes	%
Liberal	Kaka Bag-ao	25,363	54.99%
UNA	Jade Ecleo	20,758	45.01%
Total votes		46,121	100%
Liberal hold			

=== 2013 ===
2013 Philippine House of Representatives elections in Dinagat Islands' at-large district
Party	Candidate	Votes	%
Liberal	Kaka Bag-ao	25,617	53.38%
Nacionalista	Gwendolyn Ecleo	22,369	46.62%
Total votes		47,986	100%
Liberal gain from Lakas			

=== 2010 ===
2010 Philippine House of Representatives elections in Dinagat Islands' at-large district
Party	Candidate	Votes	%
Lakas	Ruben Ecleo Jr.	33,582	86.05%
Liberal	Francisco Rojas Sr.	5,443	13.95%
Total votes		39,025	100%
Lakas hold			

=== 2007 ===
2007 Philippine House of Representatives elections in Dinagat Islands' at-large district
Party	Candidate	Votes	%
Lakas	Glenda Ecleo		100%
Lakas hold			

== See also ==
- Legislative districts of Dinagat Islands
