= Dinagat, Dinagat Islands =

Municipality in Dinagat Islands, Philippines

Dinagat
- Municipality
- Municipality of Dinagat
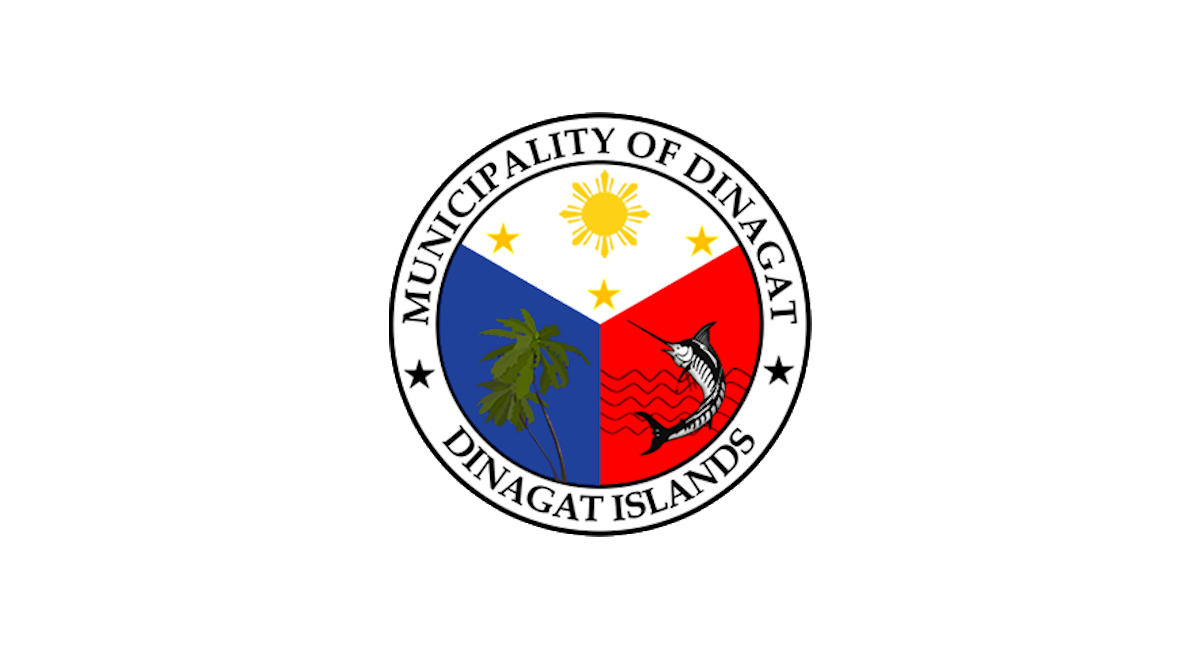
- Flag

- Map of Dinagat Islands with Dinagat highlighted
- Interactive map of Dinagat
- Location within the Philippines
- Coordinates: 9°57′22″N 125°35′36″E
- Country: Philippines
- Region: Caraga
- Province: Dinagat Islands
- District: Lone district
- Founded: 1830
- Barangays: 12 (see Barangays)

Government
  - Type: Sangguniang Bayan
  - Mayor: Simplicio S. Leyran Jr.
  - Vice Mayor: Petnel O. Sombrado
  - Representative: Alan 1 B. Ecleo
  - Municipal Council: Members: Jonathan M. Edillor; Ronald P. Letim; Constantino E. Eviota; Tita G. Edera; Marjun T. Andoy; Elvin P. Patulin; Lilibeth D. Edradan; Palermo E. Lisondra Jr.
  - Electorate: 8,828 voters (2025)

Area
  - Total: 139.94 km^{2} (54.03 sq mi)
- Elevation: 26 m (85 ft)
- Highest elevation: 343 m (1,125 ft)
- Lowest elevation: 0 m (0 ft)

Population (2024 census)
  - Total: 10,820
  - Density: 77.32/km^{2} (200.3/sq mi)
  - Households: 2,512

Economy
  - Income class: 4th municipal income class
  - Poverty incidence: 32.75% (2023)
  - Revenue: ₱ 112.9 million (2024)
  - Assets: ₱ 209 million (2024)
  - Expenditure: ₱ 103.8 million (2024)
  - Liabilities: ₱ 11.33 million (2024)

Service provider
  - Electricity: Dinagat Island Electric Cooperative (DIELCO)
- Time zone: UTC+8 (PST)
- ZIP code: 8412
- PSGC: 1608503000
- IDD : area code: +63 (0)86
- Native languages: Surigaonon; Cebuano; Tagalog

Dinagat, officially the Municipality of Dinagat (Surigaonon: Lungsod nan Dinagat; Cebuano: Lungsod sa Dinagat; Tagalog: Bayan ng Dinagat), is a municipality and the titular town in the province of Dinagat Islands, Philippines. According to the 2024 census, it has a population of 10,820.

Dinagat is 9.1 kilometres (5.7 mi) from the provincial capital San Jose.

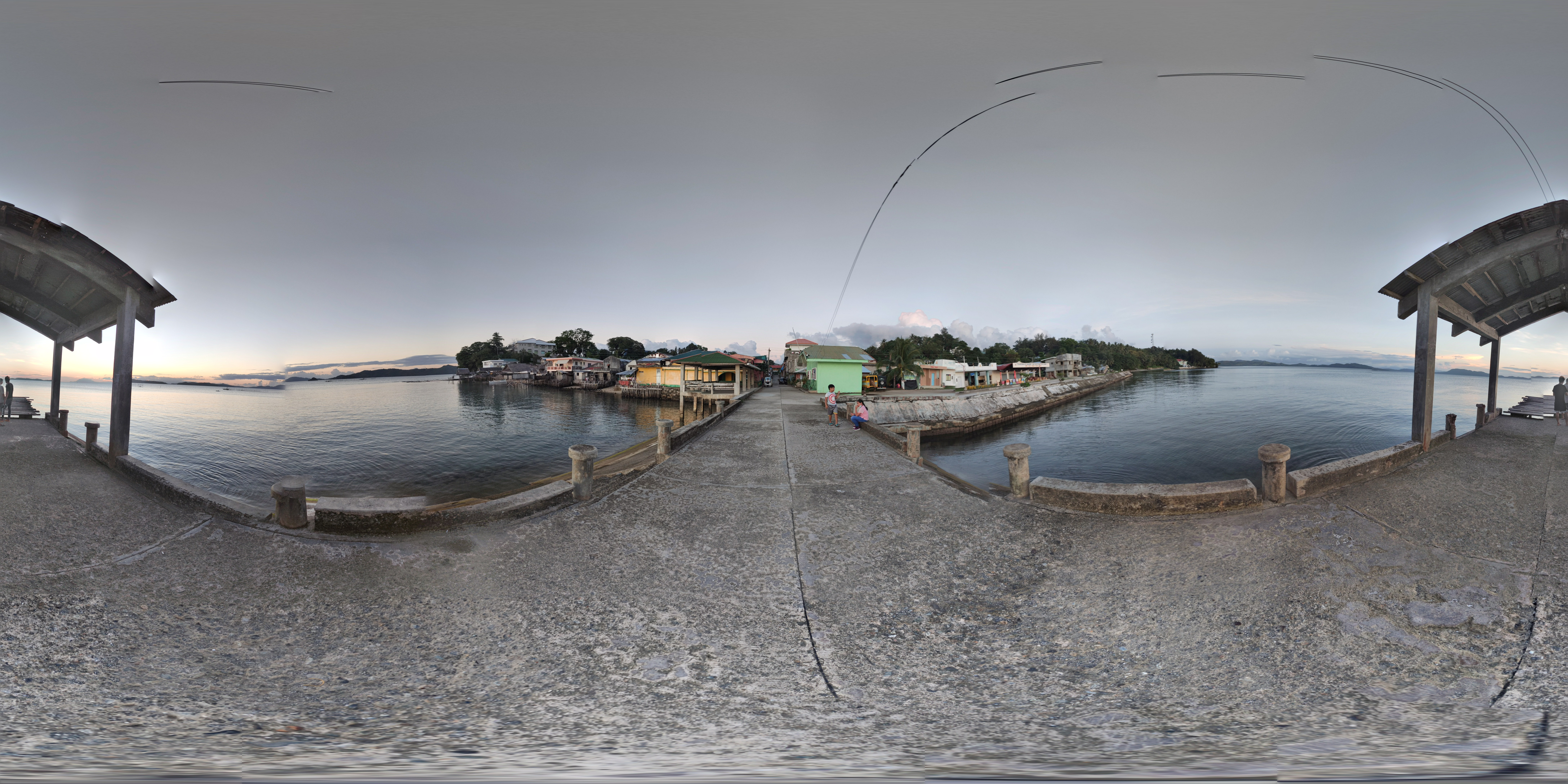
360° shot of the Barangay White Beach at the Dinagat wharf, famous for its sunset scene

== History ==
Founded under the order of Governor-General Manuel Crespo as a pueblo on April 25, 1855, the municipality is the oldest of the whole province. Settlers from Leyte, Bohol, and Surigao built their homes along the coast of what is now the poblacion of the town. According to sources, the first families to settle in the town were Ga, Ventura, Ecunar, Gealogo, Jarligo, Geraldino, Ensomo, Gier, and Eviota. However the pueblo is on constant risk of being attacked by Moro pirates from mainland Mindanao. It even reached to the point that they managed to steal the bell of the Immaculada Concepcion Parish, the only church in the town then, and dumped it in a well situated on what is now sitio Busay in Barangay New Mabuhay. But the Moro pillaging was eventually stopped by the first gobernadorcillo of the town, Pedro Ga Ventura, along with his brother Leon through estukada or fencing using linantip, a variety of bolo. They were considered by local historians as the first hero of the whole province.

The population of the town began to rapidly grow after World War II. The local economy flourished and birth rates were high with more people coming from Surigao coming to the town to settle down. Elementary and secondary schools were built in the area and later on ports and improved infrastructures were also built in the town.

The town became more populous than ever after the foundation of the Philippine Benevolent Missionaries Association, headed by the Ruben Edera Ecleo Sr, which also served as a mayor of Dinagat from 1963 to 1987. The influx of settlers, mostly PBMA members, caused a rapid rise in population. However, many of those settlers did not live at the town centre, rather at Sitio Puyangi, which would become the Municipality of San Jose, Dinagat Islands today.

Due to their areas being developed, Barangay San Jose, Matingbe, Jacques, Aurelio, Mahayahay, San Juan, Don Ruben Ecleo, Justiniana Edera, Santa Cruz, Cuarenta, Wilson and Luna was separated from the original territory of Dinagat to form the new municipality of San Jose on November 15, 1989, under Republic Act No. 6769.

The town became a part of the province of Dinagat Islands in December 2006, when the province was created from Surigao del Norte by Republic Act No. 9355. However, in February 2010, the Supreme Court ruled that the law was unconstitutional, as the necessary requirements for provincial land area and population were not met. The town reverted to Surigao del Norte. On October 24, 2012, however, the Supreme Court reversed its ruling from the previous year, and upheld the constitutionality of RA 9355 and the creation of Dinagat Islands as a province.

== Geography ==
The municipality is generally hilly with towering mountains on the eastern side and islands outlying in the western part. Plain areas are located within the vicinity of different creeks and rivers that flow to the western coast (the majority of the plains are located in Magsaysay, Cayetano, and Wadas) and are used for agricultural purposes with products being rice, maize, and cassava.

The poblacion or the town centre is located on the western end of the Dinagat Peninsula, separated by the Dinagat Bay on the north and Awasan Bay on the south. It has many pockets of beaches on its coast, mainly on the islands of Cab-Ilan and Cabayawan, but beaches are also spotted in White Beach, Wadas, and Gomez.

La isla Calaveras (Pulo), an island near Tagbuyakhaw, was used as a mass grave for people killed by brutal Japanese occupiers during World War II. But now it has become an attraction for beachgoers.

Mangroves dominate the deltas and wetlands of the coasts and are prevalent in New Mabuhay, Wadas, Magsaysay, and Cayetano. Aquaculture is lively as it has many protected fish sanctuaries in the bay.

=== Barangays ===
Dinagat is politically subdivided into 12 barangays. Each barangay consists of puroks while some have sitios.

- Bagumbayan
- Cab-ilan
- Cabayawan
- Cayetano
- Escolta (Poblacion)
- Gomez (with Tagbuyakhaw as a sitio)
- Magsaysay
- Mauswagon (Poblacion)
- New Mabuhay
- Wadas
- White Beach (Poblacion) (with Canmingi as a sitio)

=== Climate ===
Climate data for Dinagat, Dinagat Islands
Month	Jan	Feb	Mar	Apr	May	Jun	Jul	Aug	Sep	Oct	Nov	Dec	Year
Mean daily maximum °C (°F)	27 (81)	28 (82)	28 (82)	29 (84)	30 (86)	29 (84)	29 (84)	29 (84)	30 (86)	29 (84)	29 (84)	28 (82)	29 (84)
Mean daily minimum °C (°F)	23 (73)	23 (73)	23 (73)	23 (73)	25 (77)	25 (77)	25 (77)	25 (77)	25 (77)	25 (77)	24 (75)	24 (75)	24 (75)
Average precipitation mm (inches)	210 (8.3)	161 (6.3)	123 (4.8)	85 (3.3)	148 (5.8)	186 (7.3)	164 (6.5)	157 (6.2)	141 (5.6)	190 (7.5)	223 (8.8)	200 (7.9)	1,988 (78.3)
Average rainy days	21.0	16.8	18.5	18.2	24.9	27.7	28.4	27.0	26.1	27.6	24.6	22.0	282.8
Source: Meteoblue

The town generally experiences dry season from April to October along with wavy seas due to the Habagat (Southwestern Monsoon) and wet season from November to March.

== Demographics ==
Population census of Dinagat
Year	Pop.	±% p.a.
1903	3,050	—
1918	8,382	+6.97%
1939	9,533	+0.61%
1948	11,105	+1.71%
1960	10,095	−0.79%
1970	6,714	−3.99%
1975	22,284	+27.20%
1980	36,726	+10.50%
1990	8,659	−13.46%
1995	8,609	−0.11%
2000	9,883	+3.00%
2007	11,961	+2.67%
2010	12,786	+2.46%
2015	10,632	−3.45%
2020	10,621	−0.02%
2024	10,820	+0.45%
Source: Philippine Statistics Authority

== Economy ==
Poverty incidence of Dinagat (%)

Source: Philippine Statistics Authority

== Gallery ==
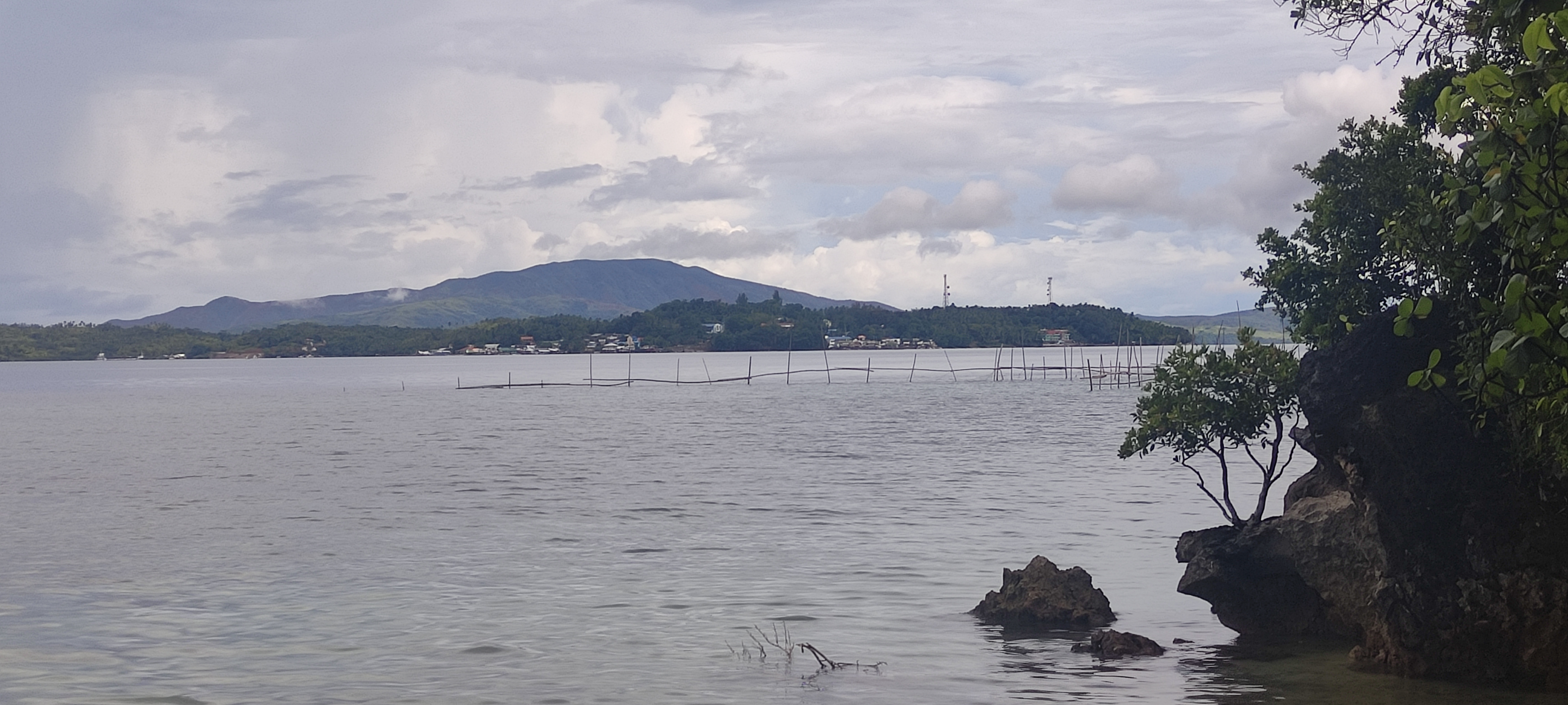
Dinagat's poblacion, viewed from La Isla Calavera
