= Kaka Bag-ao =

Filipino human rights lawyer

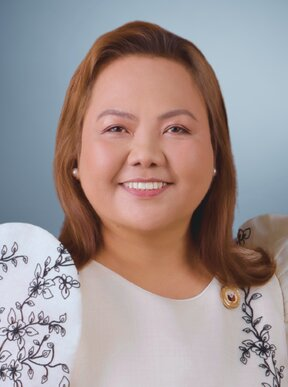
- Official portrait, 2025

Member of the Philippine House of Representatives from Dinagat Islands's Lone District
- Incumbent
- Assumed office June 30, 2025
- Preceded by: Alan Uno Ecleo
- In office June 30, 2013 – June 30, 2019
- Preceded by: Ruben B. Ecleo, Jr.
- Succeeded by: Alan Uno Ecleo

House Deputy Minority Leader
- Incumbent
- Assumed office July 30, 2025
- Leader: Marcelino Libanan

Governor of Dinagat Islands
- In office June 30, 2019 – June 30, 2022
- Vice Governor: Nilo Demerey Jr.
- Preceded by: Glenda Ecleo
- Succeeded by: Nilo Demerey Jr.

Member of the Philippine House of Representatives for Akbayan
- In office June 30, 2010 – June 30, 2013 Serving with Walden Bello
- Preceded by: Risa Hontiveros
- Succeeded by: Barry Gutierrez

Personal details
- Born: Arlene Javellana Bag-ao; 3 July 1969 (age 57) Ermita, Manila, Philippines
- Party: Liberal (2012–present); Akbayan (partylist; 2009–present)
- Education: De La Salle University (AB); Ateneo de Manila University (JD)
- Profession: Lawyer
- Website: https://www.facebook.com/kakabagao

Arlene "Kaka" Javellana Bag-ao (born July 3, 1969) is a Filipino human rights lawyer and agrarian reform advocate who has served as the representative for the lone district of the Dinagat Islands since 2025, previously serving from 2013 to 2019. She also served as Governor of the Dinagat Islands from 2019 to 2022. She has been dubbed as the 'Dragon Slayer' after consecutively defeating two of the most prominent members of the influential Ecleo political dynasty of the Dinagat Islands.

== Education ==
Born in Manila, but raised in Loreto, Surigao del Norte (now part of Dinagat Islands), Bag-ao took her elementary education at Loreto Central Elementary School. She then took her secondary education at Southeastern College in Pasay. Bag-ao earned her Bachelor of Arts degree in Political Science from the De La Salle University in 1989, and her Juris Doctor (JD) degree from the Ateneo Law School of the Ateneo de Manila University in 1993, where she became a Judge de Veyra Scholarship Awardee and an Ateneo School of Law Scholarship Awardee. She passed the Philippine Bar Examinations in 1994. She was a Law and Human Rights Humphrey Fellow — in the Academic Year 2006-2007 - at the University of Minnesota, under a program implemented by the Fulbright Commission of the United States of America.

== Early career ==
=== Alternative lawyer ===
Bag-ao is one of the founders and the former Executive Director of BALAOD Mindanaw, a law group based in Mindanao working for the advancement and protection of the rights of farmers, fisherfolks, indigenous peoples and women's and other marginalized groups through the creative and developmental use of the law.

As an alternative lawyer, she is also involved in policy reform both at the local and national levels, working with different advocacy groups and law school based organizations in the country. She provides paralegal training and legal clinics to grassroots organizations and has won cases with them.

Bag-ao is a member of the independent secretariat to the peace talks between the Government of the Republic of the Philippines and the Revolutionary Worker's Party of Mindanao (RPMM) that facilitated the signing of the agreement on the cessation of hostilities and the agreement to integrate community consultations as an essential component of the peace process.

In 2004, Bag-ao was asked to become the special consultant to the Secretary of the Department of Agrarian Reform and facilitated the awarding of numerous land titles to farmer-beneficiaries. She was also responsible for the formulation and issuance of a Memorandum Circular — later affirmed by the Supreme Court — requiring the DAR to proceed with the acquisition and distribution of lands to farmer-beneficiaries despite injunction orders issued by regular courts. Bag-ao provided leadership for the Alternative Law Groups (ALG), as a Convenor in 2005-2006 and as a Council Member thereafter.

The ALG is a coalition of twenty (20) alternative legal resource non-government organizations engaged in developmental lawyering in different parts of the country. Under Bag-ao's leadership, the ALG implemented a program in partnership with the Supreme Court which complemented its Action Program on Judicial Reform and resulted in the Supreme Court's programs on access to justice by the poor. The ALG also pushed for the enactment of several social legislations, including the enactment of the Juvenile Justice Law and the Supreme Court ruling on the indefeasibility of titles issued under the agrarian reform program.

Bag-ao was the lead counsel in the Sumilao Farmers' case, a case of indigenous farmers who walked for 1,700 kilometers from Bukidnon to Manila to claim rights to their lands under agrarian reform against one of the biggest corporations in the Philippines. The Sumilao Farmers' case generated national and international attention and support. The case also inspired the Church to shepherd their cause and eventually resulted in an agreement under which the farmers would be given back their land.

== Political career ==
=== Akbayan Representative (2010–2013) ===
On 30 June 2010, Bag-ao was sworn in as the second representative of Akbayan Party in the 15th Philippine Congress.

Together with fellow Akbayan Representative Walden Bello, she was the author of numerous progressive bills in Congress such as House Bill No. 3763 (Alternative Minerals Management Bill), House Bill No. 513 (Reproductive Health Bill), House Bill No. 468 (Sangguniang Kabataan Reform and Empowerment Bill), House Bill No. 515 (Anti-Discrimination Bill), House Bill No. 5312 (Comprehensive HIV and AIDS Bill), and House Bill No. 4268 (Healthy Beverages Options Bill or 'Chip's Bill,' named after Chip Gatmaytan, a young advocate of the measure).

Bag-ao was a principal author of Republic Act No. 10354 or the Reproductive Health and Responsible Parenthood Law. She was also the principal author of House Bill No. 6545 or the National Land Use Bill, which was passed by the House of Representatives.

Bag-ao was the vice-chairperson of the House Committee on Agrarian Reform. She is one of the champions of Kaya Natin, a non-government organization founded by the late Interior and Local Government Secretary Jesse Robredo that advocates good governance and ethical leadership. She was also one of only two women public prosecutors in the impeachment trial of Supreme Court Chief Justice Renato Corona.

=== Dinagat Islands Representative caretaker (2013) ===
As a native of the province and through the endorsement of Surigao del Norte Representatives Francisco Matugas and Guillermo Romarate, Jr., Bag-ao was appointed by House Speaker Feliciano Belmonte, Jr. as the Legislative Liaison Officer or Caretaker of the Lone District of Dinagat Islands.

Upon her assumption as Dinagat caretaker, Bag-ao led a series of consultations in the province's 100 barangays, asking the residents of their community concerns and development projects they wish to see. In just three months, Bag-ao was able to roll-out the following development programs and projects:

- P3-million worth of free medical assistance at the Caraga Regional Hospital;
- P8-million worth of scholarships for the Dinagat youth at the Surigao State College of Technology (SSCT) and other state universities and colleges;
- P120-million worth of infrastructure projects for all barangays, including roads, bridges, water systems, barangay halls, barangay gym, sea walls, etc.; and
- 77 "Sasakyan Ng Barangay" multicabs for faster delivery of government services even in the province's remotest communities.

=== Dinagat Islands Representative (2013–2019) ===
At the May 2013 general elections, Bag-ao was elected representative of the Lone District of Dinagat Islands, edging out Dinagat municipal mayor Gwendolyn Ecleo with 3,248 votes. Bag-ao was dubbed as a 'Dragon Slayer' for defeating a political behemoth in her province.

In the 16th Congress, she was elected as the Chairperson of the Special Committee on Land Use.

She was the principal author of several legislative measures, such as the proposed National Land Use Act, the People's Freedom of Information Bill, the Anti-Discrimination Bill, and the Agrarian Reform Commission Bill.

In November 2015, she, along with fellow legislators Rep. Leni Robredo (3rd District of Camarines Sur), Rep. Bolet Banal (3rd District of Quezon City), and Rep. Teddy Baguilat (Lone District of Ifugao), introduced a new proposed measure entitled the Open Door Policy Bill, which seeks to prohibit government offices from denying citizens access to front line services and public meetings on the basis of attire. The bill gained international recognition when it was featured in Time Magazine.

In January 2016, the Sangguniang Kabataan Reform Act was passed into law. Bag-ao is one of its principal authors in the House of Representatives through House Bill No. 109.

In the May 2016 elections, Bag-ao was reelected as representative of the lone district of Dinagat Islands, defeating this time Gwendolyn Ecleo's older sibling, Jade Ecleo, who was the province's former governor. She was again lauded as a 'Dragon Slayer' for defeating the two most prominent members of the Ecleo political dynasty in the province.

Bag-ao pushed for the Anti-Discrimination Bill (now known as the SOGIE Equality Bill) to be passed into law in the House of Representatives. Fellow congresswoman Geraldine Roman, the first transgender congressional representative in the country, called her the "heart and soul" of the Bill. Bag-ao was the pioneer of the Equality Champions Coalition in Congress, along with Senator Risa Hontiveros.

In March 2017, Bag-ao voted against the re-imposition of the death penalty in the Philippines. The ruling PDP-Laban party stripped her committee chairmanship on People's Participation afterwards. She later said that she voted "no" because of her principle and her belief that the death penalty is always inhumane and wrong.

In September 2017, Bag-ao voted against a House budget ruling that gave one thousand pesos (around 20 dollars) for the 2018 budget of the Commission on Human Rights. Bag-ao was one of the only 32 lawmakers to vote against the budget. The budget, however passed in the House after more than a hundred government-allied lawmakers voted in its favor. Public outraged erupted afterwards, condemning the budget cut for a commission responsible for looking at the human rights violations of the government. Protests were held in various cities nationwide. The budget was eventually restored to its original amount after a few days.

On the same month, after 17 years of political limbo, the SOGIE Equality Bill finally passed in the House of Representatives under Bag-ao's principal authorship. Bag-ao was the vice-chairperson of the House Committees on Ecology, Labor and Employment, and Population and Family Relations. She had influential political powers on the Committees on Women and Gender Equality, Natural Resources, Mindanao Affairs, Human Rights, Justice, and Constitutional Amendments, among many others.

In October 2017, she was one of only two House committee members who voted against the sufficiency of the grounds to impeach Chief Justice Maria Lourdes Sereno. Bag-ao argued that many of the allegations being thrown at the Chief Justice were not sufficient and not even grounds for impeachment.

=== Governor of Dinagat Islands (2019–2022) ===
On May 13, 2019, Bag-ao was elected governor in the 2019 general election. She defeated Benglen Ecleo, a member of the Ecleo political clan.

As provincial chief executive, she introduced programs described as citizen-centered and participatory, aimed at empowering farmers, fisherfolk, women, and other marginalized groups to become active partners in local governance. These include community-based conservation tourism, job creation through Bantay Gubat and Bantay Dagat programs, access to justice in barangays, and infrastructure projects for the benefit of small farmers, fisherfolk, and businesses.

Her administration’s participatory approach was credited as a factor in Dinagat Islands’ COVID-19 pandemic response in 2020, where the province was noted for early community engagement and coordination with health authorities. Bag-ao also oversaw the rehabilitation and recovery efforts following the devastation of Super Typhoon Rai (locally Odette) in December 2021, mobilizing provincial resources alongside national government and humanitarian assistance.

In the 2022 Philippine general election, Bag-ao failed in her bid for a second term as Governor.

=== Dinagat Islands Representative (2025) ===
Bag-ao was elected again to Congress in the 2025 Philippine general election. She defeated incumbent representative Alan Uno Ecleo.

In the opening of the 20th Congress of the House of Representatives, she abstained from voting in the speakership race, which placed her as a member of the minority. Bag-ao was eventually elected as one of the Deputy Minority Leaders of the bloc led by 4Ps Partylist Rep. Marcelino Libanan.

==== Authored legislation ====
The following are some of the bills principally authored by Kaka Bag-ao and were deemed as priority legislation:

- SOGIE Equality Act
- National Land Use Act
- Philippine HIV and AIDS Policy Act
- Philippine Mineral Resources Act
- Security of Tenure Act
- Coconut Farmers Development Act
- Agrarian Reform Commission Act
- People's Freedom of Information Act
- Open Door Policy Act
- Land Acquisition and Distribution Completion Law
- Barangay Security, Health, and Nutrition Worker's Benefits Act
- Comprehensive Anti-Discrimination Act
- Department of Ocean, Fisheries, and Aquatic Resources Act
- Anti-Political Dynasty Act
- Participatory Reform for Rural Development Act
- On-Ste, In-City, or Near-City Resettlement Act
- National Food Security Act
- Right to Adequate Food Framework Act
- Individual Income Tax Reduction Act
- Pantawid Pamilyang Pilipino Act
- Caraga Regional Hospital Upgrade Law
- Local Population Development Act

== Electoral history ==
Electoral history of Kaka Bag-ao
Year	Office	Party	Votes received				Result
Year	Office	Party	Total	%	P.	Swing	Result
2010	Representative (Party-list)	Akbayan	1,061,947	3.53%	4th	+0.62	Won
2013	Representative (Dinagat Islands)	Liberal	25,617	53.38%	1st	—N/a	Won
2016	Representative (Dinagat Islands)	Liberal	25,363	54.99%	1st	+1.61	Won
2025	Representative (Dinagat Islands)	Liberal	36,958	54.91%	1st	-0.08	Won
2019	Governor of Dinagat Islands	Liberal	29,869	52.67%	1st	—N/a	Won
2022	Governor of Dinagat Islands	Liberal	26,055	42.76%	2nd	-9.91	Lost

== Achievements ==
- 2006 Hubert H. Humphrey Fellow for Law and Human Rights at the University of Minnesota.
- 2008 Frederik Ozanam Award for her work with the Sumilao Farmers. The award was "given to exemplary individuals who, in living out the demands of faith, justice, and love, have given distinctive and continued service to their brothers and sisters, especially the poor and suffering" during the Annual Academic Convocation of the Ateneo de Manila University.
- 2009 Parangal para sa Natatanging Indibidwal na Katuwang sa Pagsusulong ng Hustisyang Panlipunan by De La Salle University.
- 2010 Outstanding Women in the Nation's Service (TOWNS) Award in Alternative Lawyering.
- 2013 Rotary Outstanding Surigaonon Award (ROSA) for Law and Public Service by the Rotary Club of Metro Surigao
- 2013 Distinguished Leadership Award for Internationals under the Hubert H. Humphrey Fellowship by the University of Minnesota of the United States.
- 2014 Rainbow Award by the Quezon City Pride Council for her dedication on equality for all sexual orientations and gender identities.
- 2015 Freedom Flame Award by Friedrich Naumann Foundation for Freedom (FNF), one of the most prestigious freedom awards in contemporary history.
