= Gwendolyn Ecleo =

Filipino politician (born 1974)

Gwendolyn Ecleo-Pols
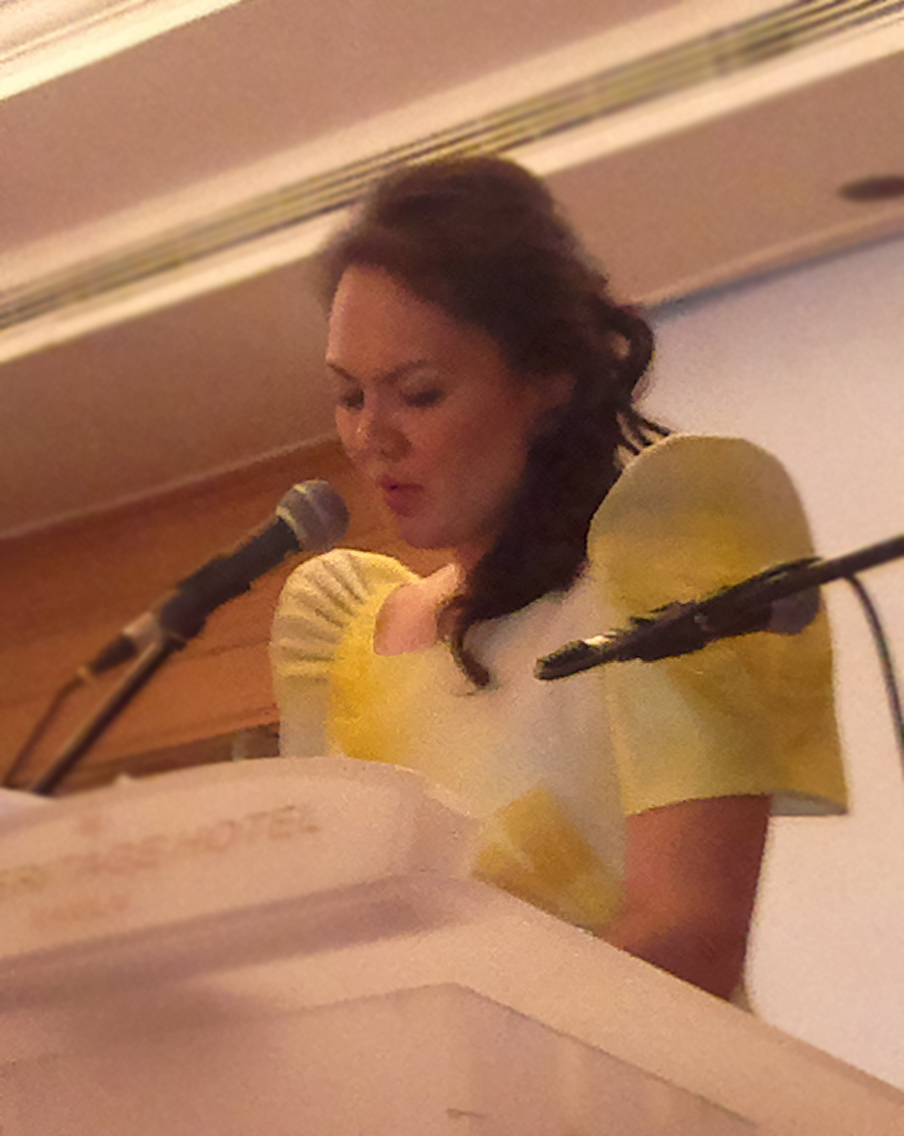
- Gwen Ecleo, Mayor of Dinagat, Dinagat Islands from 2004 to 2013

Member of the Dinagat Islands Provincial Board from the 2nd district
- In office June 30, 2019 – June 30, 2025

Mayor of Dinagat
- In office 2004–2013

Personal details
- Born: Gwendolyn Buray Ecleo; August 25, 1974 (age 52) San Jose, Surigao del Norte, Philippines
- Party: Lakas (until 2012; 2021–present)
- Other political affiliations: PDP-Laban (2018–2021); Nacionalista (2012–2018)
- Spouse(s): Terence David Pols; Baltazar Robert Durano
- Education: Centro Escolar University

Gwendolyn Buray Ecleo-Pols (born August 25, 1974) is a Filipino politician and Mayor of Dinagat, Dinagat Islands, Philippines, from May 2004 until 2013. She also serves in various capacities as an official of the Philippine Benevolent Missionaries Association, Incorporated (PBMA, Inc.), a religious group widely considered a cult based on its practices.

== Biography ==
Ecleo is the youngest daughter of the late Supreme President of P.B.M.A and the former longest running Mayor of Dinagat Islands, Ruben Edera Ecleo, Sr. and Glenda B. Ecleo, the former Congresswoman who served as the second Governor of the province of Dinagat Islands.

As for her primary education, Ecleo went to Saint Theresa's College of Cebu City, in Cebu City. She went to high school at La Consolacion College Manila, continued her studies at Don Jose Ecleo Memorial Foundation, and graduated in the year 1990. She attended college and graduated in Centro Escolar University with a degree in Doctor of Dental Medicine (DMD) in the year 2001.

In 2004, Gwendolyn Ecleo ran for and won the mayor's position in Dinagat, Dinagat Islands to replace her brother, Allan B. Ecleo I, who became the Mayor of Basilisa, Dinagat Islands, and is now a congressman of the province's lone congressional district.

In her third term as mayor, Ecleo progressed on a lot of projects specifically on these guided terms which she developed: H-EALTH, E-DUCATION, L-IVELIHOOD, P-ROTECTION TO ENVIRONMENT, !-NFRASTRUCTURE (H.E.L.P ! Pangga Dinagat).

She was also elected national auditor of the Philippines International Sisterhood and Twinning Association (PHISTA).

In 2013, she was succeeded by her son, Mayor Craig Ecleo.
