= Ruben Ecleo Jr. =

Filipino politician, religious figure and convict (1960–2021)

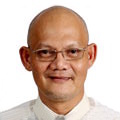
- Official portrait, 2010

Member of the Philippine House of Representatives from Dinagat Islands' Lone District
- In office June 30, 2010 – May 31, 2012
- Preceded by: Glenda B. Ecleo
- Succeeded by: Kaka Bag-ao

Mayor of San Jose, Surigao del Norte
- In office 1991–1994

Personal details
- Born: Ruben Buray Ecleo Jr. April 16, 1960
- Died: May 13, 2021 (aged 61) Muntinlupa, Philippines
- Party: Lakas
- Children: 4
- Parents: Ruben Ecleo Sr. (father); Glenda Buray (mother)
- Occupation: Politician
- Criminal information
- Other name: Manuel Riberal
- Spouse: Alona Bacolod (m. 1996; died 2002)
- Status: Dead (in prison, 2002–2004 and 2020–2021)
- Criminal charges: Parricide, graft and corruption
- Penalty: Life imprisonment (parricide); 18–30 years of imprisonment (graft)

Details
- Imprisoned at: New Bilibid Prison

Ruben Buray Ecleo Jr. (April 16, 1960 – May 13, 2021) was a former Filipino politician and religious figure who was the leader of the Philippine Benevolent Missionaries Association who was convicted and imprisoned for multiple counts of murder and graft and corruption until his death in 2021.

== Background ==
Ecleo was born to the influential Ecleo political family in the Dinagat Islands. His father Ruben Sr. was a former mayor of San Jose, while his mother Glenda was a former member of the House of Representatives.

== Philippine Benevolent Missionaries Association ==
Ecleo Jr. in 1987 inherited the leadership of the Philippine Benevolent Missionaries Association (PBMA), an organization ran by his father Ruben Sr. He was Supreme President of the PBMA and was sometimes referred to as the "Supreme Master" of the group. The PBMA is headquartered in San Jose in the Dinagat Islands.

The PBMA has been characterized as a cult. The older Ecleo claimed to have supernatural abilities while the younger one was reportedly believed to be a reincarnation of Jesus Christ.

== Political career ==
Ecleo was Mayor of San Jose from 1991 to 1994 when the town was still part of Surigao del Norte.

Ecleo was elected as a member of the House of Representatives for Dinagat Islands' lone district in the 2010 election. He was removed from his position on May 31, 2012 due to his conviction for graft and corruption.

== Crimes ==
Ruben Ecleo Jr. was married to Alona Bacolod. He strangled his wife to death in their residence in Cebu City on January 5, 2002. At the time of her death, Bacolod was in her 20s and a fourth-year medical student. Bacolod's body was found three days later in a ravine in Dalaguete. Ecleo's crime was linked to his dependency on methamphetamine by a court testimony of one of Bacolod's seven siblings.

On June 18, 2002 Alona's brother Ben, a key witness to Ecleo's case along with her parents and sister Evelyn were killed at their house in Mandaue.

A warrant for his arrest was released. The police and military went to the PBMA headquarters in San Jose, Dinagat Islands to serve the warrant. At the moment of his arrest, 19 June 2002, 16 of his armed followers were killed.

Ecleo was detained, but released on bail on 2 March 2004 to seek treatment for his heart condition.

On 13 October 2006, the Sandiganbayan sentenced Ecleo to thirty years in prison for entering a 1993 government contract in which the government lost about ₱2.4 million. He was found guilty of three counts of violating Republic Act 3019. His co-defendants, Anadelia Nalauan-Navarra and Ricardo Santillan, were convicted of twice violating the anti-graft laws and sentenced to six to ten years for each count. The case involved the funding of the construction of the market and municipal building and repair of a building owned by the PBMA during Ecleo's tenure as San Jose mayor.

Ecleo stopped attending hearings in 2011 when his bail was cancelled but continued to be tried in absentia. He was convicted in April 13, 2012 for parricide.

Ecleo was arrested in San Fernando, Pampanga on July 30, 2020 after being a fugitive for almost a decade. Police later said that he had fled the Dinagat Islands and moved to Metro Manila in 2014 before ultimately hiding in a subdivision in Angeles City under the name "Manuel Riberal". He had also taken in another wife who was aged 30 at the time of his arrest and had a one-year old daughter with her.

== Illness and death ==
Ecleo contracted COVID-19 and was brought to the Dr. J. Sabili General Hospital in Taguig on April 25, 2021. He died at the New Bilibid Prison Hospital in Muntinlupa due to cardiac arrest on May 13, having also suffered from jaundice and kidney disease.

== See also ==
- List of members of the Philippine House of Representatives expelled, removed, or suspended
