= Philippine Benevolent Missionaries Association =

Fraternal organization

- Philippine Benevolent Missionaries Association, Inc.
- Seal

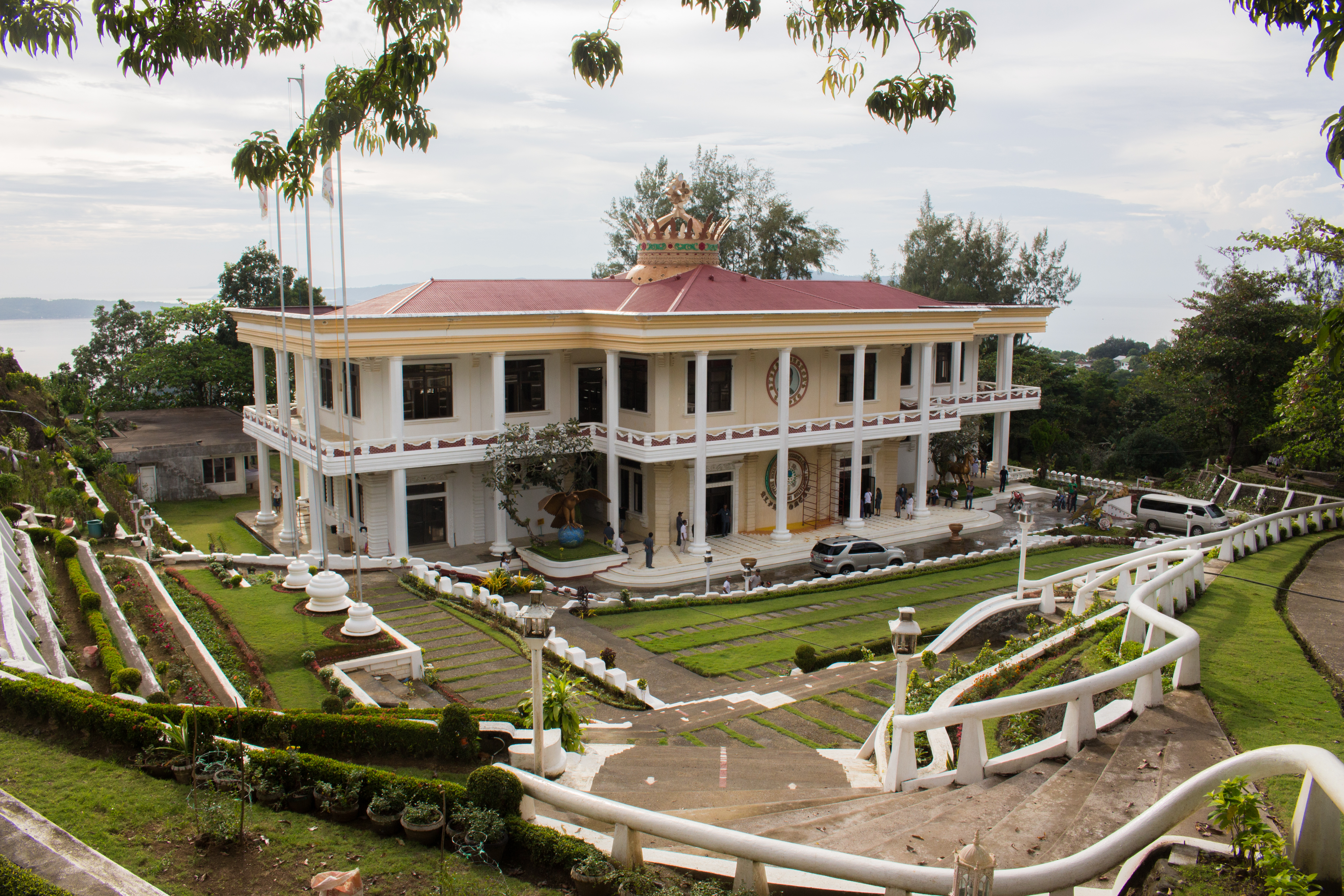
- PBMA Divine Master's Shrine, Aurelio, San Jose, Dinagat Islands.
- Formation: 1965; 61 years ago
- Founder: Ruben Ecleo Sr.
- Location: San Jose, Dinagat Islands, Philippines
- Members: 140,000 (2013)

The Philippine Benevolent Missionaries Association, Inc. (PBMA) is a non-sectarian and non-profit charitable religious fraternal organization for men and women in the Philippines founded by Ruben Edera Ecleo Sr. (December 9, 1934 – December 20, 1987) in 1965 on the Philippine island of Dinagat, off the coast of Mindanao. Upon the senior Ecleo's death in 1987, he was succeeded by his son Ruben B. Ecleo Jr., who died in prison on May 13, 2021, after being convicted of killing his wife in 2002.

As of 2013, the group claimed to have 140,000 members. It was registered with the Securities and Exchange Commission (SEC), in Makati, Philippines, on October 19, 1965, under Registration No. 28042. Its main office is located in San Jose, province of Dinagat Islands.

The Manila Times estimates the group has raised at least PHP 35 million in entrance fees from its members since its founding and has been labeled a religious cult.

== Beliefs ==
According to sect doctrine, Ecleo Sr. was trained by "voices" to fluently read and write Arabic, Hebrew, Sanskrit, and Aramaic, to interpret ancient mysteries. He also made predictions of the future based on Akashic records. PBMA followers also viewed Ecleo Sr. as a Christ-like figure, who could accomplish anything by reciting the Mantra, and like the Christ of the Bible, was also able to resurrect the dead. Ecleo's healing abilities were stated to have directly come from "our Divine Father by virtue of the sacred or divine prayers which are called in Occultism as Mantras."

Sect leaders also stated that Ecleo Sr. had since his childhood been simultaneously present in many disparate locations, possibly as many different people. An example was his doing missionary work in Agusan del Sur, while also traveling in the province of Samar. All of his different persona possessed the ability to heal like the "Lord Jesus who first applied these powers in Judea".

== Controversies ==
=== Parricide case and raid ===
Group members, described by local media organizations as heavily armed and willing to die for their leader, made effort to thwart police efforts to arrest Ruben Ecleo Jr. A source for the Manila Times reported that armed PBMA members made an oath to protect the "supreme master" (Ecleo), who was evading police efforts to arrest him for the murder of his wife, Alona Bacolod-Ecleo, a fourth-year medical student. Bacolod-Ecleo was found strangled in a rubbish bag at the bottom of a cliff in Cebu in January 2002.

Ecleo Jr. was arrested after a bloody raid by law enforcement in Dinagat on June 19, 2002. Gunfire had erupted, as a joint force of PNP officers and troopers from the Philippine Army's 20th Infantry Battalion moved in to serve an arrest warrant. The raid had begun after negotiations had broken down and approximately 2,000 PBMA followers had surrounded Ecelo's mansion and barred all access. A firefight with Ecleo's elite team of bodyguards, known as the White Eagles, then erupted and lasted through the night. Ecleo finally surrendered to police at 9:00 am the following day.

The gun battle during the night left 23 dead, including one police officer and 16 armed PBMA members. During the raid, four members of his dead wife's family, including Candy Ecleo, were gunned down by a member of the PBMA security force in a possible cover-up attempt; the assailant was killed by police moments later, while attempting to flee the scene.

Ecleo Jr. faced the parricide case before the Cebu City Regional Trial Court, Branch 23. However, the case dragged on because six judges recused. On April 25, 2008, the sixth judge, Geraldine Faith Econg, per a 24-page resolution, recused herself amid accusations and her own admission that two women approached her to ask how much would she need in payment for dropping the case.

Ecleo Jr. stopped attending hearings in 2011 after his bail was cancelled but continued to be tried in absentia. He was convicted on April 13, 2012, for parricide.

Ecleo Jr. was arrested in San Fernando, Pampanga, on July 30, 2020, after being a fugitive for almost a decade. Police later said that he had fled the Dinagat Islands and moved to Metro Manila in 2014 before ultimately hiding in a subdivision in Angeles City under a false name. He had also taken in another wife and had a one-year-old daughter with her. He later died at the New Bilibid Prison Hospital in Muntinlupa due to multiple illnesses on May 13, 2021.

=== Pulahan incident ===
There is often violence between the PBMA, other Christian groups, and the security forces in the islands. Such an incident occurred in 2000 when approximately one hundred members of the rival Pulahan sect launched an assault on a PBMA shrine on the island of Dinagat, in turn two hundred PBMA members counterattacked and hacked to death ten Pulahan followers as well as their leader Edecio Quinanola.
