= Tago =

Tago may refer to:

- Tago District, Gunma
- Tago Island
- Tago Mago, 1971 studio album by Can
- Tago River
- Tago, Surigao del Sur
- UDP-N-acetylglucosamine—undecaprenyl-phosphate N-acetylglucosaminephosphotransferase

== Surname ==
- Agaese Tago (1939–2017), American Samoa politician
- Akira Tago (1926–2016), Japanese psychologist
- Izack Tago (born 2002), Samoa international rugby league footballer
- Kenichi Tago (born 1989), Japanese former badminton player
