= Bayabas =

Bayabas may refer to:

- The common name for the guava in the Philippines
- Bayabas, Surigao del Sur
