= Pedro M. Trinidad Jr. =

Pedro Maquiling Trinidad Jr. (born October 6, 1943), also known as Pete was the class valedictorian of Tigao Elementary 1954. He was sent to Sacred Heart Seminary in Manila, Philippines at the age of 10 in 1954 to join the congregation. There he finished high school and took up college courses. He finished AB-English Language at the age of 21 in 1965. After earning a degree he went back to his home town and ran for the position of Sangguniang Bayan (SB member). He was fortunate to be elected as one of the SB members of Cortes, Surigao del Sur. However, he faced conflicts with other politicians. In the late 1965, he went back to Manila. There he decided to study again and took up AB-Philosophy in Ateneo de Manila University and graduated in 1967. He returned to his home town after graduation and worked in the Local Government of Cortes as the Municipal Planning Development Coordinator. On May 25, 1985, he was married to Edna J. Esplana. He had three children, namely, Peter Neil, Mario Gemmo, and Lady Marie. His 25 years of work in Cortes was not the end of his service to his home town. In June 2005, he ran in the government and was elected as the Municipal Mayor of Cortes. As a current mayor, he is active in marine conservation. He held talks inside and outside the country regarding marine life and implemented strict rules to protect the rich marine biodiversity in Cortes.
