= Adela Serra Ty Memorial Medical Center =

Government hospital in Surogao del Sur, Philippines

Adela Serra Ty Memorial Medical Center (ASTMMC)

Geography
- Location: Tandag, Surigao del Sur, Caraga, Philippines
- Coordinates: 9°04′07″N 126°11′25″E

Organization
- Type: Level 2

Services
- Beds: 500

History
- Founded: April 6, 1961; 65 years ago

Links
- Website: astmmc.doh.gov.ph

The Adela Serra Ty Memorial Medical Center (ASTMMC) is a level 3 government hospital in the Philippines with an authorized bed capacity of five hundred (500). It is located at the Capitol Hills, Telaje, Tandag.
