= Tago River =

- Tago River mouth Tago River (Philippines)
- Native name: Ilog Tago (Tagalog)

Location
- Country: Philippines
- Region: Caraga
- Province: Surigao del Sur
- Municipality: Sibagat, Tandag City, San Miguel, Tago

Physical characteristics
- Source
  - location: Sibagat, Agusan del Sur, Caraga Region
- Mouth: Philippine Sea
  - location: Purisima (Poblacion), Tago, Surigao del Sur
  - coordinates: 9°00′52″N 126°14′12″E
- Length: 19 km (12 mi)
- Basin size: 35 km^{2} (14 sq mi)
- Discharge
  - location: Tago River
  - average: 56 m^{3}/s (2,000 cu ft/s)

Basin features
- Progression: Tago River- Philippine Sea

The Tago River (Tagalog: Ilog Tago; Cebuano: Suba sa Tago; Surigaonon: Suba nan Tago) is a stream located in Sibagat, Agusan del Sur, and the municipalities of San Miguel and Tago, Surigao del Sur, Caraga Region, in northeastern Mindanao, in southern Philippines.

== Etymology ==
Tago is a Visayan term meaning "hide" or "hidden".

== Geography ==
The Tago River is situated approximately 9.01555556, 126.24055556 in the island of Mindanao. The estimate terrain elevation above sea level is 1 metre.

The Tago River headwaters from the Diwata Mountain Range in Sibagat, Agusan del Sur. It traverses along the barangays of Kolambugan and Padiay in Sibagat; the riverbank barangays of Bitaugan, Bagyang, Calatngan, Carromata, Sagbayan, Poblacion, Baras and Libas Gua (all in the municipality of San Miguel, Surigao del Sur); and barangays of Badong, Alba, Bangsud, Anahao Bag-o, Anahao Daan, Gamut, Camagong, Unaban, Unidos, Purisima (all in the municipality of Tago, Surigao del Sur) where its mouth located in Barangay Poblacion meet with the Philippine Sea of the Western Pacific Ocean.

The Tago River also serves as boundaries that separates the municipalities of Tago and Bayabas, Surigao del Sur, as well as Tago and Tandag City.

== Tago River basin ==
The Tago River basin is composed of the province of Surigao del Sur and Agusan del Sur in Mindanao. It lies at 125°43’ to 126°16’ east longitude and 8°44’ to 9°11’ north latitude. It traverses the municipality of Sibagat of Agusan del Sur and the municipalities of Cantilan, Lanuza, Tandag City, San Miguel, Cagwait, and Tago of Surigao del Sur. The basin has an estimated drainage area of 1,448 square kilometers, and is about 50 kilometers long and 60 kilometers wide.

The Tago River is the principal drainageway of the basin. It originates in the City of Cabadbaran, Agusan del Norte, and the municipality of Sibagat, Agusan del Sur, and traverses the entire length of the basin in an easterly direction and discharges into the Philippine Sea. The river channel is wide and is navigable by motorboats up to about 45 kilometers from its outlet. Several tributaries, such as the Maitum and Umalag Rivers that pass Barangay Poblacion in San Miguel, Surigao del Sur, and the Bagyang River, which traverses from Barangay Bitaugan down to Barangay Calatngan of the same municipality, contribute directly to the Tago River.

== Watershed ==
The Tago River Watershed, covering a total area of 143,770 hectares, has its Headwaters originating from the northwestern portion of Diwata Mountain Range located in Sibagat in the Province of Agusan del Sur. Its major tributaries are the Agasan River, Calatngan River, Baroboan River, Umalag River and Suba River. Among the more prominent flowing creeks/tributaries are the Malagdao Creek, Malitbog Creek, Bato Creek, Dioco Creek, Bacnalon Creek, Balancanadan Creek, Pajo Creek, Bakaka-an Creek, Bitaugan Creek, Cadilotan Creek, and Enadan Creek.

Following a southeasterly direction, the Tago Riverenters the SUDECOR area at the midsection of the western boundary where it drains an area of more than 35,500 ha. From there, along its sinuous course, the Tago River is fed with waters of Agasan, Calatngan, Baroboan, and Suba River draining the northwestern, central, southwestern and southeastern part, respectively. Shortly after leaving the main forest concession and upon reaching the flood plains of San Miguel, the waters draining from the Tago River and its tributaries are tapped by a National Irrigation Administration (NIA) diversion dam for irrigating some 14,000-ha of rice fields in the San Miguel–Tago area. About 9 km further downstream, the Tago River the water of the Suba River that drains the southeastern part, thence the river continues eastward until it reaches the Philippine Sea near the town of Tago, Surigao del Sur.

== See also ==
- Agusan River
- Wawa River (Agusan del Sur)
- Andanan River
- Sibagat River
- List of rivers of the Philippines
