= Cortes, Surigao del Sur =

Municipality in Surigao del Sur, Philippines

Cortes
- Municipality
- Municipality of Cortes
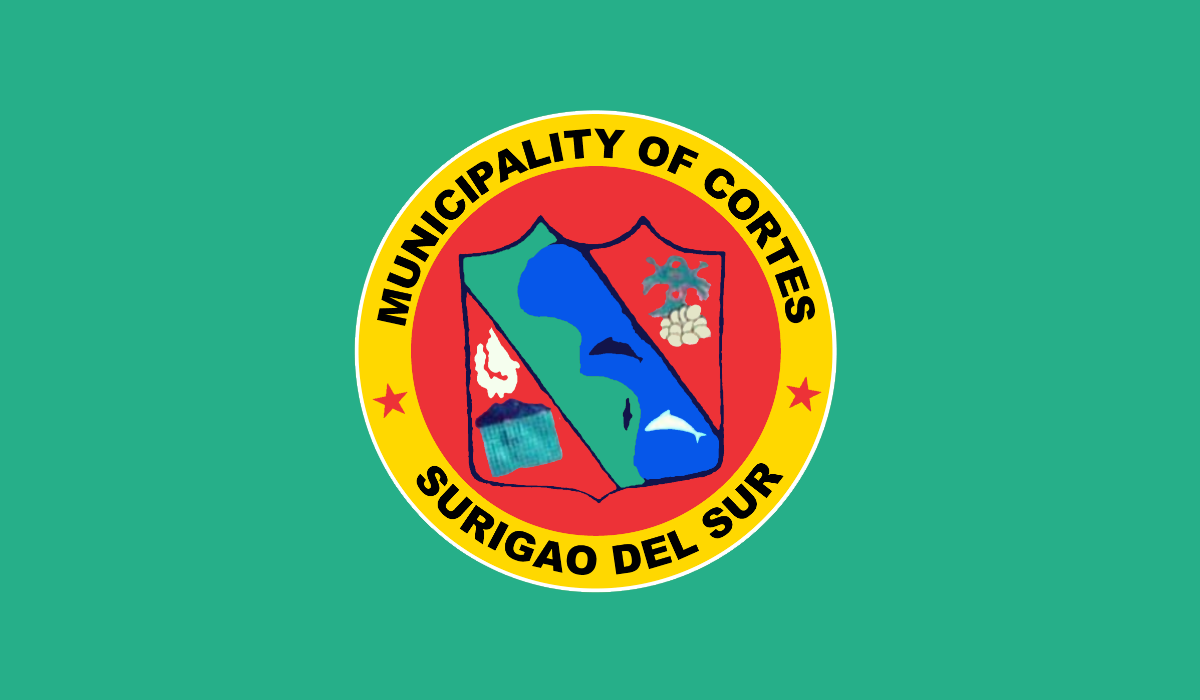
- Flag Seal

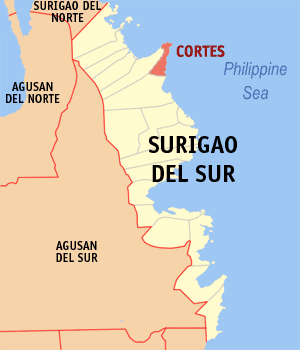
- Map of Surigao del Sur with Cortes highlighted
- Interactive map of Cortes
- Location within the Philippines
- Coordinates: 9°16′31″N 126°11′28″E
- Country: Philippines
- Region: Caraga
- Province: Surigao del Sur
- District: 1st district
- Founded: October 1, 1953
- Barangays: 12 (see Barangays)

Government
  - Type: Sangguniang Bayan
  - Mayor: Frederick P. Yu
  - Vice Mayor: Cherry B. Daraman
  - Representative: Romeo S. Momo Sr.
  - Electorate: 14,351 voters (2025)

Area
  - Total: 127.08 km^{2} (49.07 sq mi)
- Elevation: 39 m (128 ft)
- Highest elevation: 453 m (1,486 ft)
- Lowest elevation: 0 m (0 ft)

Population (2024 census)
  - Total: 18,023
  - Density: 141.82/km^{2} (367.32/sq mi)
  - Households: 4,108

Economy
  - Income class: 4th municipal income class
  - Poverty incidence: 10.9% (2023)
  - Revenue: ₱ 129.4 million (2024)
  - Assets: ₱ 284.5 million (2024)
  - Expenditure: ₱ 43.02 million (2024)
  - Liabilities: ₱ 74.31 million (2024)

Service provider
  - Electricity: Surigao del Sur 2 Electric Cooperative (SURSECO 2)
- Time zone: UTC+8 (PST)
- ZIP code: 8313
- PSGC: 1606808000
- IDD : area code: +63 (0)86
- Native languages: Surigaonon; Agusan; Cebuano; Kamayo; Tagalog
- Website: www.cortes.gov.ph

Cortes, officially the Municipality of Cortes (Surigaonon: Lungsod nan Cortes; Tagalog: Bayan ng Cortes), is a municipality in the province of Surigao del Sur, Philippines. According to the 2024 census, it has a population of 18,023 people.

Cortes faces the Philippine Sea on the eastern part. It has a protected marine sanctuary located in barangay Balibadon, Capandan, Mabahin, Poblacion, Tigao, Uba and Tag-anongan. It is known in the province of Surigao del Sur for its rich source of seafoods in the area. You can find different kinds of fish, crabs, etc. It has beaches with white sands and water falls. It also has a bird sanctuary located in barangay Burgos. It also has a wide area for agriculture. It has two seasons, rainy and sunny.

== History ==
Cortes was originally known as "Kagyunod". It cannot be traced who changed Kagyunod into Cortes but many believed that Cortes derived its name after Governor General Cortes who was assigned to the Philippines by the Spanish King.

Cortes was once part of Tandag. It gained its independence on October 1, 1953, by virtue of Executive Order No. 642 series of 1953 creating Cortes into an independent municipal or corporation. It was not until March 19, 1954, however, that the new local government unit formally started to function with the assumption into office of the first set of municipal officials appointed by then President Elpidio R. Quirino.

== Geography ==
Cortes lies between 9 deg. 08'00 N to 9 deg. 19'00 North latitude and 126 deg. 03'00 to 126 deg. 13'00 East longitude or lies in the mid-eastern portion of Surigao del Sur along the Pacific Coast. It is 28 kilometers from Tandag, the capital of the province. Cortes is bounded on the east by the vast Pacific Ocean, on the north by the Municipality of Lanuza and Lanuza Bay, on the south by the municipality of Tandag, and on the west by the municipalities of Lanuza and Tandag.

Cortes has a land area of 13,509.00 hectares. It comprises 12 barangays with Balibadon and Tag-anongan as the biggest and smallest barangays respectively.

Cortes has numerous rolling hills and uneven distribution of lowlands. Mabahin, Tigao and Burgos have a large area of rice and swamplands, the rest of the barangays are generally hilly. The south-western portion of the town is generally mountainous and covered with second growth forest.

=== Barangays ===
Cortes is politically subdivided into 12 barangays. Each barangay consists of puroks while some have sitios.

In 1955, the sitios of Uba, Mabahin, Tag-anongan and Manlico were converted into barrios.

- Balibadon
- Burgos
- Capandan
- Mabahin
- Madrelino
- Manlico
- Matho
- Poblacion
- Tag-anongan
- Tigao
- Tuboran
- Uba

=== Climate ===
Climate data for Cortes
Month	Jan	Feb	Mar	Apr	May	Jun	Jul	Aug	Sep	Oct	Nov	Dec	Year
Mean daily maximum °C (°F)	28.6 (83.5)	28.8 (83.8)	29.7 (85.5)	30.7 (87.3)	31.6 (88.9)	31.5 (88.7)	31.5 (88.7)	31.7 (89.1)	31.7 (89.1)	31.1 (88.0)	30.2 (86.4)	29.2 (84.6)	30.5 (87.0)
Daily mean °C (°F)	25.3 (77.5)	25.4 (77.7)	26.1 (79.0)	26.8 (80.2)	27.6 (81.7)	27.4 (81.3)	27.4 (81.3)	27.5 (81.5)	27.5 (81.5)	27.1 (80.8)	26.5 (79.7)	25.8 (78.4)	26.7 (80.1)
Mean daily minimum °C (°F)	22.1 (71.8)	22.1 (71.8)	22.5 (72.5)	22.9 (73.2)	23.6 (74.5)	23.4 (74.1)	23.3 (73.9)	23.4 (74.1)	23.3 (73.9)	23.1 (73.6)	22.8 (73.0)	22.5 (72.5)	22.9 (73.2)
Average rainfall mm (inches)	825 (32.5)	694 (27.3)	529 (20.8)	374 (14.7)	250 (9.8)	177 (7.0)	164 (6.5)	139 (5.5)	157 (6.2)	218 (8.6)	485 (19.1)	700 (27.6)	4,712 (185.6)
Source: Climate-Data.org

=== Flora ===
In 2023, a Vulnerable species of Begonia, B. noraaunorae, named after Nora Aunor, a Filipina actress and National Artist of the Philippines, was discovered in the limestone areas of this town.

== Demographics ==
Population census of Cortes
Year	Pop.	±% p.a.
1903	1,213	—
1960	8,342	+3.44%
1970	9,428	+1.23%
1975	10,871	+2.90%
1980	12,338	+2.56%
1990	13,234	+0.70%
1995	13,054	−0.26%
2000	14,825	+2.76%
2007	15,913	+0.98%
2010	15,541	−0.86%
2015	15,912	+0.45%
2020	17,924	+2.54%
2024	18,023	+0.13%
Source: Philippine Statistics Authority

== Economy ==
Poverty incidence of Cortes (%)

Source: Philippine Statistics Authority

Agriculture is the major source of living in Cortes. It is also known for its rich source of sea foods. Fishing is one source of living. However, there are limitations that been lay down by the local government to protect their sea against abuse. Farming is the second source of living.

== Tourism ==
Attractions include:

- Laswitan Lagoon (a 20-foot rock formation with three lagoons; name derives from the word "laswit" which means splash; when the water is high, especially during Amihan season, it creates huge waves that will splash on the rocks and creates a waterfall effect)
- Bakwitan Cave
- Lubcon Falls
- Bugsay Beach Resort
- Sihagan Beach
- Buybuyan Beach
- La Soledad Beach

== Culture ==
=== Festivals ===
- Kadagatan Festival – Every 21st to 24th day of July, the town of Cortes celebrates Kadagatan Festival. This festival is celebrated because of the abundance of fishes and other seafoods that Cortes have. The Rabita Statue symbolize this festival. You can see the statue in Cortes Commercial Triangle.
- Araw ng Cortes – Every 29th day of September up to 1st day of October, Cortes celebrates Araw ng Cortes. This is because Cortes have its freedom from being separated from Tandag City.

== Notable people ==
- Pedro M. Trinidad Jr. (born 1943), mayor of Cortes.
