= Begonia noraaunorae =

Conservation status
- Vulnerable (IUCN 3.1)

Scientific classification
- Kingdom: Plantae
- Clade: Tracheophytes
- Clade: Angiosperms
- Clade: Eudicots
- Clade: Rosids
- Order: Cucurbitales
- Family: Begoniaceae
- Genus: Begonia
- Species: B. noraaunorae

Binomial name
- Begonia noraaunorae Blasco, Tandang, Alejandro & Rubite
- Distribution of Begonia noraaunorae in the Philippines (Mindanao)
- Distribution of B. noraaunorae in Mindanao (Surigao del Sur).

Species of flowering plant

Begonia noraaunorae is an endemic species of Begonia found in Surigao del Sur, Mindanao Island, Philippines. The species was compared to B. negrosensis Elmer, from which it resembled by its glabrous stems, leaves that are obovately oblong in shape and with sparse hairs, the lamina with glossy surface adaxially and light green abaxially, the staminate flowers having 2 tepals, the pistillate flowers having 5 tepals, and the green ovaries. However, this species differed from B. negrosensis by its larger leaves with scattered light green patches, shorter stems, a much larger, serrated lamina, shape of tepals of staminate flower, and longer ovary with no subtending bracteoles. The species is named after the Filipina actress and National Artist, Nora Aunor. The species is classified under IUCN Red List criteria as Vulnerable.

== Phenology ==
The species was flowering and fruiting in the months of April to June.

== Etymology ==
This species was named to honor Nora Aunor for her achievements in the entertainment industry. Born Nora Cabaltera Villamayor, she is a film producer, TV host, actor, singer, philanthropist, and an awardee of National Arts for Film and Broadcast Arts (the highest national recognition given to a Filipino artist).

== Distribution and ecology ==
Begonia noraaunorae is found on limestone rocks in semi-shaded broadleaf forest. The species is endemic to the province of Surigao del Sur, Caraga Region, in the Eastern part of Mindanao, in the Philippines. It occurs at an elevation of 30 meters above sea level in the town of Cortes, Surigao del Sur.

== Vernacular name and uses ==
The species is known by the local name of amampang or as amamampang, a Bisaya and Subanen term that means growing on a cliff. According to the local knowledge, the leaves of the species is used to treat coughs. Additionally, the young leaves are edible, and is used as a spice in cooking paksiw.

== Proposed conservation status ==
The population of this species was found near the highway, and its collection for consumption makes it vulnerable to anthropogenic activities. It is also known only from the type locality, with the total young and mature population on 4 sites at less than 1000 individuals. Thus it was assessed as Vulnerable according to the IUCN Red List criteria.
