= Bayabas, Surigao del Sur =

Municipality in Surigao del Sur, Philippines

Bayabas
- Municipality
- Municipality of Bayabas
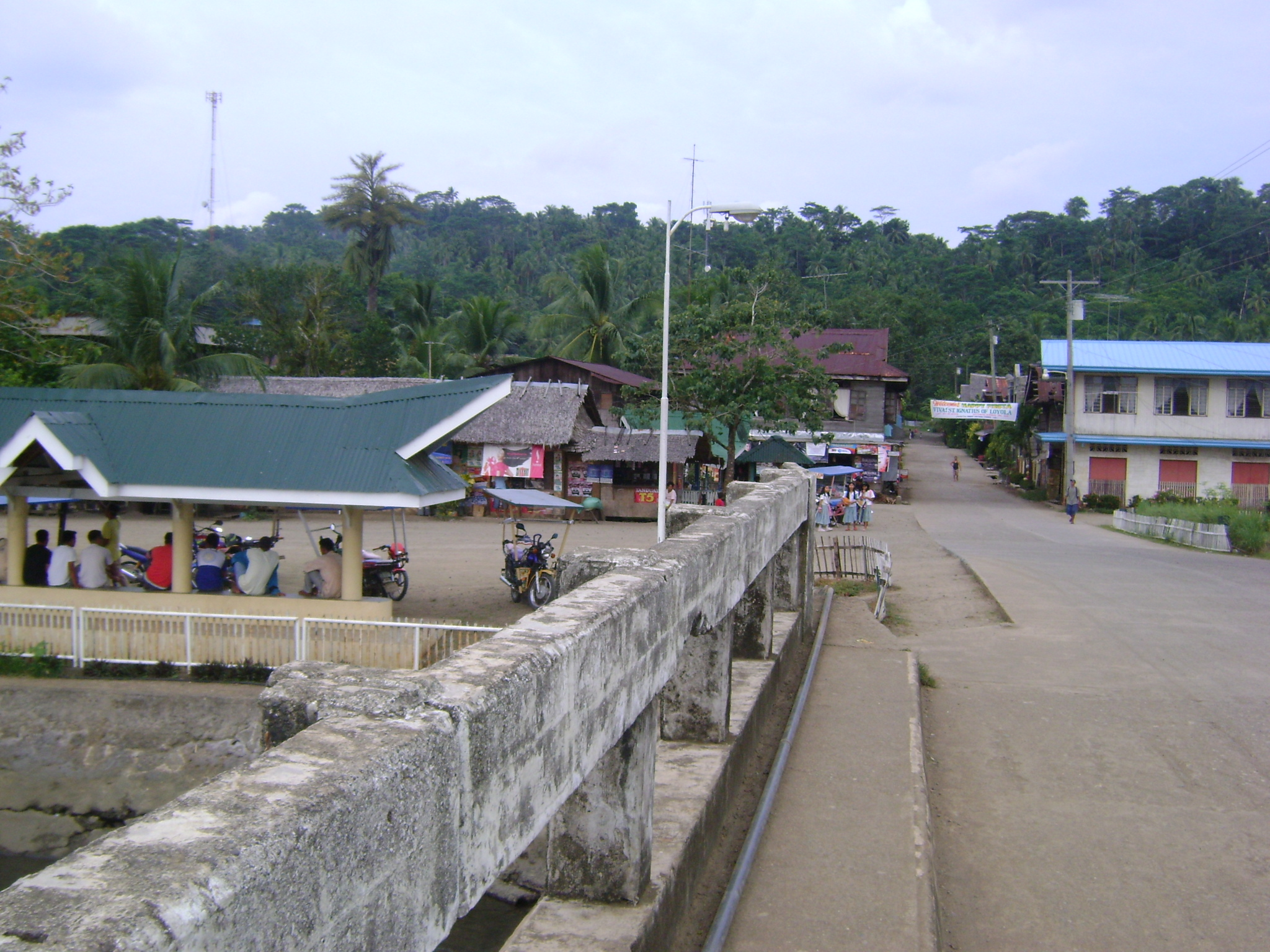
- Highway showing a bridge on the main road of Bayabas

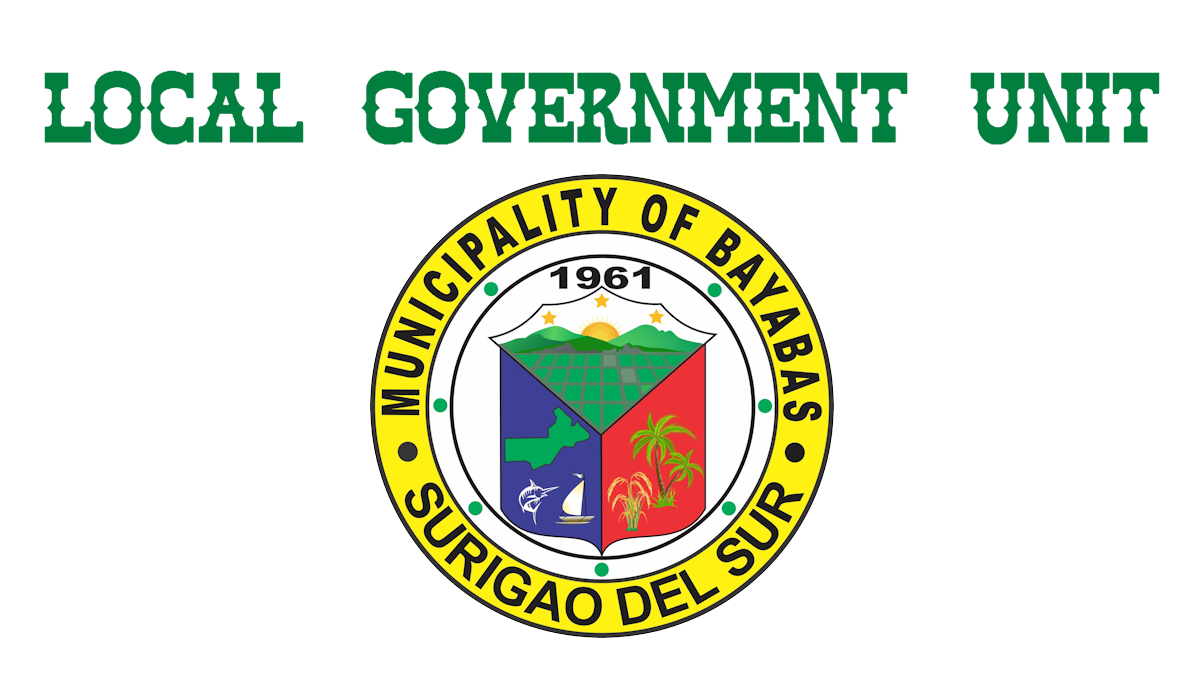
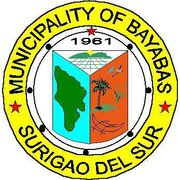
- Flag Seal
- Etymology: Guava
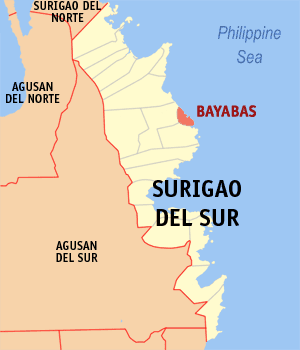
- Map of Surigao del Sur with Bayabas highlighted
- Interactive map of Bayabas
- Location within the Philippines
- Coordinates: 8°58′04″N 126°16′54″E
- Country: Philippines
- Region: Caraga
- Province: Surigao del Sur
- District: 1st district
- Barangays: 7 (see Barangays)

Government
  - Type: Sangguniang Bayan
  - Mayor: Apolonio B. Lozada
  - Vice Mayor: Maria Clarita Garcia-Limbaro
  - Representative: Romeo S. Momo Sr.
  - Electorate: 7,226 voters (2025)

Area
  - Total: 117.84 km^{2} (45.50 sq mi)
- Elevation: 31 m (102 ft)
- Highest elevation: 275 m (902 ft)
- Lowest elevation: 0 m (0 ft)

Population (2024 census)
  - Total: 9,016
  - Density: 76.51/km^{2} (198.2/sq mi)
  - Households: 2,133

Economy
  - Income class: 4th municipal income class
  - Poverty incidence: 15.95% (2023)
  - Revenue: ₱ 106 million (2024)
  - Assets: ₱ 287.3 million (2024)
  - Expenditure: ₱ 39.51 million (2024)
  - Liabilities: ₱ 85.21 million (2024)

Service provider
  - Electricity: Surigao del Sur 2 Electric Cooperative (SURSECO 2)
- Time zone: UTC+8 (PST)
- ZIP code: 8303
- PSGC: 1606802000
- IDD : area code: +63 (0)86
- Native languages: Surigaonon; Agusan; Cebuano; Tagalog
- Website: www.bayabas.gov.ph

Bayabas, officially the Municipality of Bayabas (Surigaonon: Lungsod nan Bayabas; Tagalog: Bayan ng Bayabas), is a municipality in the province of Surigao del Sur, Philippines. According to the 2024 census, it has a population of 9,016 people, making it the least populated municipality in the province.

== History ==
=== World War II ===
During 1943 and 1944 much of the east coast of Mindanao was occupied by the Japanese. Bayabas was not occupied, although at times Japanese navy ships anchored in the harbor off the coast of the town. As the Japanese occupied an increasing number of area coastal towns, refugees trickled into town. The prewar rector of San Nicolas School, in Surigao City, was one of a number of priests who sought refuge in Bayabas. Food supplies soon failed to reach town from the outside, since Japanese troops disrupted distribution.

== Geography ==
Bayabas is located between Tago and Cagwait. The Tago River separates the municipalities of Tago and Bayabas. Bayabas is consist of seven barangays mostly located along the coastlines. Though Bayabas is a small municipality, it is also abundant in natural resources especially seafoods.

=== Barangays ===
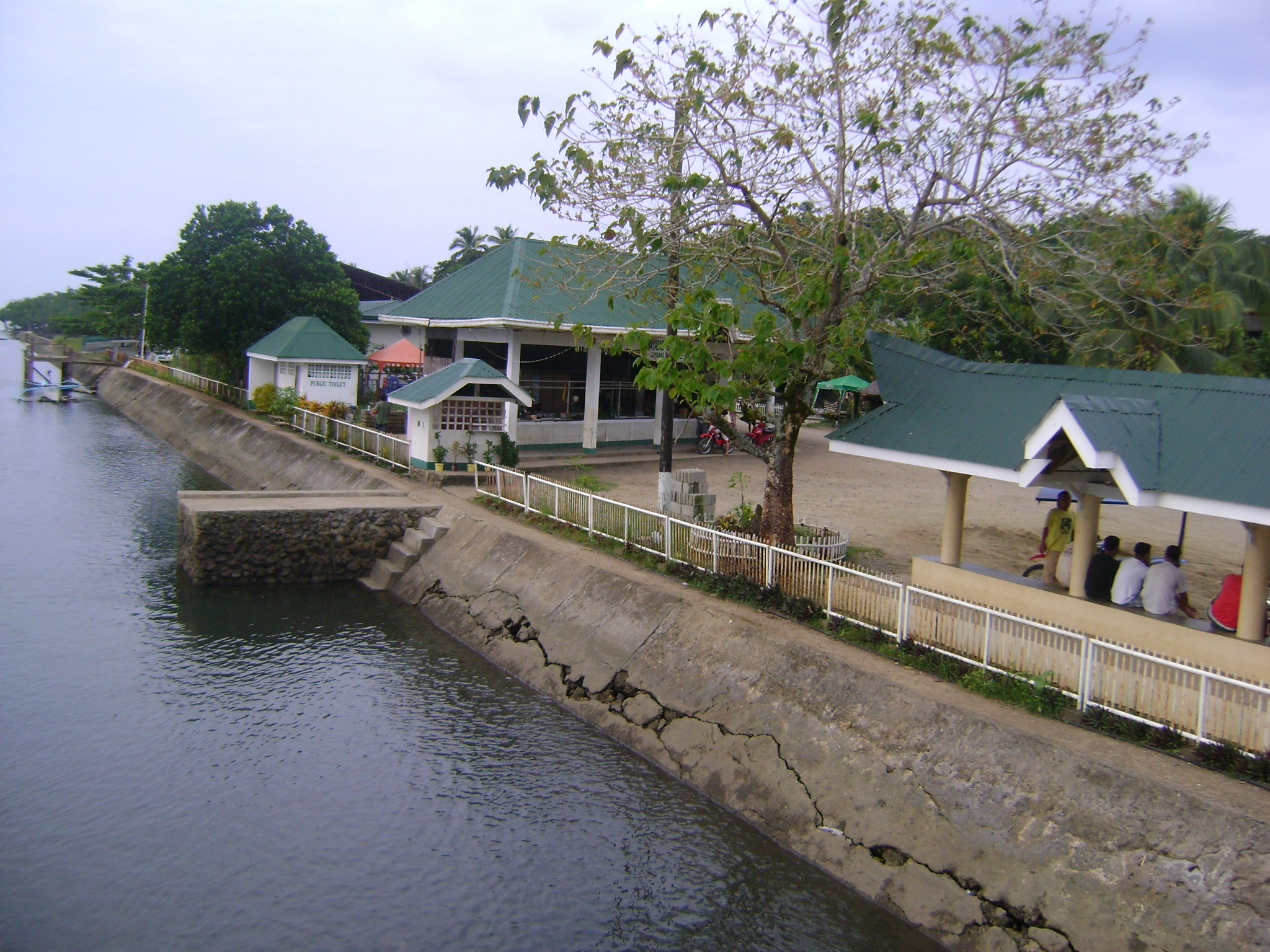
Bayabas seawall

Bayabas is politically subdivided into 7 barangays. Each barangay consists of puroks while some have sitios.

- Amag
- Balete (Poblacion)
- Cabugo
- Cagbaoto
- La Paz
- Magobawok (Poblacion)
- Panaosawon

=== Climate ===
Climate data for Bayabas
| Month | Jan | Feb | Mar | Apr | May | Jun | Jul | Aug | Sep | Oct | Nov | Dec | Year |
|---|---|---|---|---|---|---|---|---|---|---|---|---|---|
| Mean daily maximum °C (°F) | 28.9 (84.0) | 29.1 (84.4) | 30.0 (86.0) | 31.0 (87.8) | 31.8 (89.2) | 31.7 (89.1) | 31.7 (89.1) | 32.0 (89.6) | 32.0 (89.6) | 31.4 (88.5) | 30.5 (86.9) | 29.5 (85.1) | 30.8 (87.4) |
| Daily mean °C (°F) | 25.6 (78.1) | 25.6 (78.1) | 26.3 (79.3) | 27.0 (80.6) | 27.7 (81.9) | 27.5 (81.5) | 27.4 (81.3) | 27.7 (81.9) | 27.6 (81.7) | 27.2 (81.0) | 26.6 (79.9) | 26.0 (78.8) | 26.9 (80.3) |
| Mean daily minimum °C (°F) | 22.3 (72.1) | 22.2 (72.0) | 22.6 (72.7) | 23.0 (73.4) | 23.7 (74.7) | 23.4 (74.1) | 23.2 (73.8) | 23.4 (74.1) | 23.2 (73.8) | 23.1 (73.6) | 22.8 (73.0) | 22.6 (72.7) | 23.0 (73.3) |
| Average rainfall mm (inches) | 730 (28.7) | 616 (24.3) | 456 (18.0) | 328 (12.9) | 260 (10.2) | 181 (7.1) | 186 (7.3) | 152 (6.0) | 169 (6.7) | 208 (8.2) | 454 (17.9) | 629 (24.8) | 4,369 (172.1) |
Source: Climate-Data.org

Bayabas has a tropical rainforest climate (Af) with heavy to very heavy rainfall year-round and with extremely heavy rainfall in January.

== Demographics ==
Population census of Bayabas
| Year | Pop. | ±% p.a. |
|---|---|---|
| 1970 | 4,810 | — |
| 1975 | 4,859 | +0.20% |
| 1980 | 5,881 | +3.89% |
| 1990 | 6,259 | +0.62% |
| 1995 | 6,423 | +0.49% |
| 2000 | 7,706 | +3.98% |
| 2007 | 7,439 | −0.49% |
| 2010 | 7,779 | +1.64% |
| 2015 | 8,164 | +0.92% |
| 2020 | 8,979 | +2.02% |
| 2024 | 9,016 | +0.10% |
Source: Philippine Statistics Authority

== Economy ==
Poverty incidence of Bayabas

Source: Philippine Statistics Authority
