= DXRM =

Coordinates: 7°13′7.08″N 124°14′33.27″E

Radyo Natin Tandag (DXRM)
- Tandag; Philippines
- Broadcast area: Northern Surigao del Sur
- Frequency: 95.9 MHz
- Branding: Radyo Natin 95.9

Programming
- Languages: Surigaonon, Filipino
- Format: Community radio
- Network: Radyo Natin Network

Ownership
- Owner: MBC Media Group

History
- First air date: 1997

Technical information
- Licensing authority: NTC
- Power: 1,000 watts

DXRM (95.9 FM), broadcasting as Radyo Natin 95.9, is a radio station owned and operated by MBC Media Group. The station's studio is located in Brgy. Bag-ong Lungsod, Tandag.
