= Tandag =

Capital city of Surigao del Sur, Philippines

- Component city
- City of Tandag
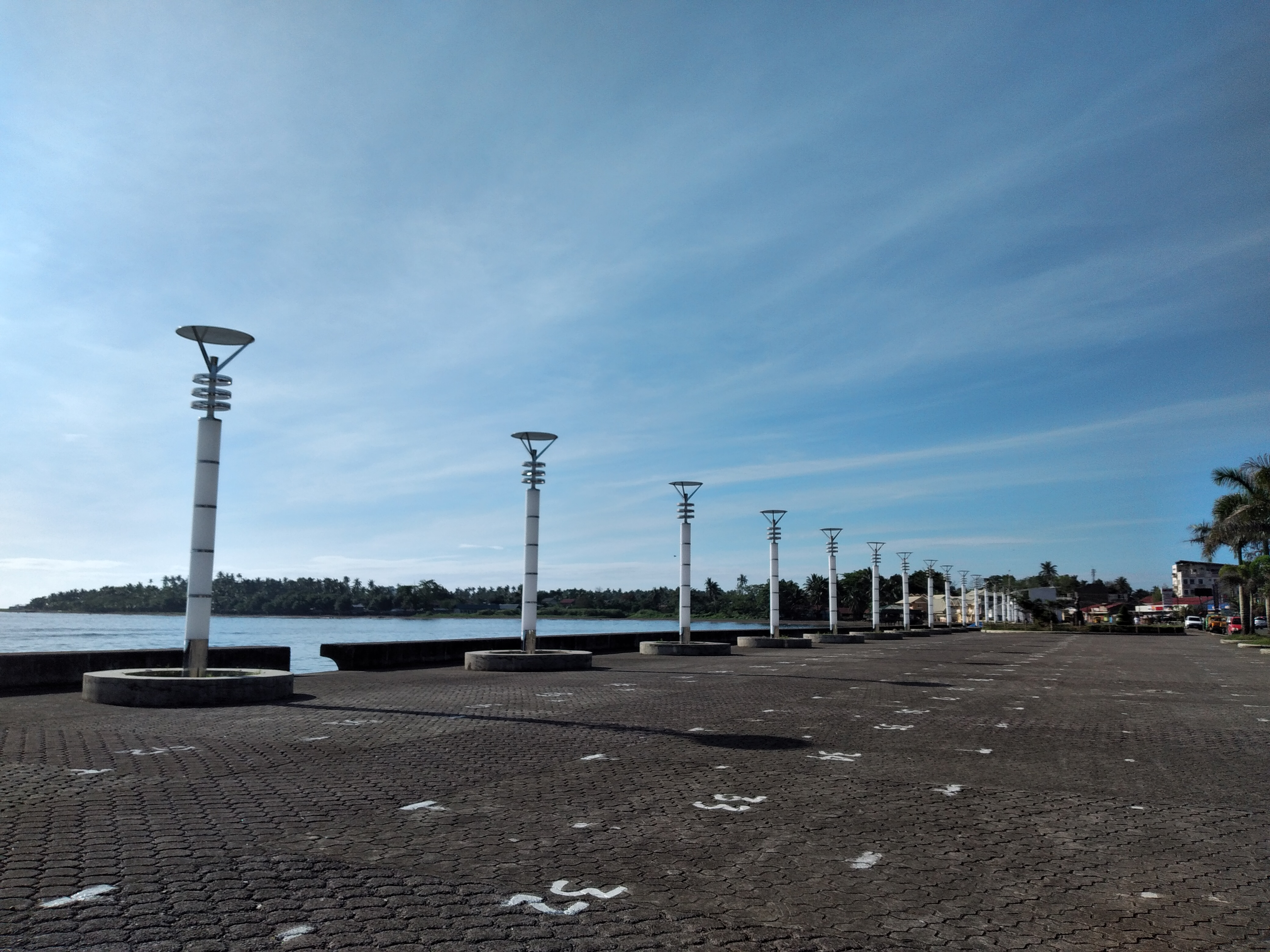
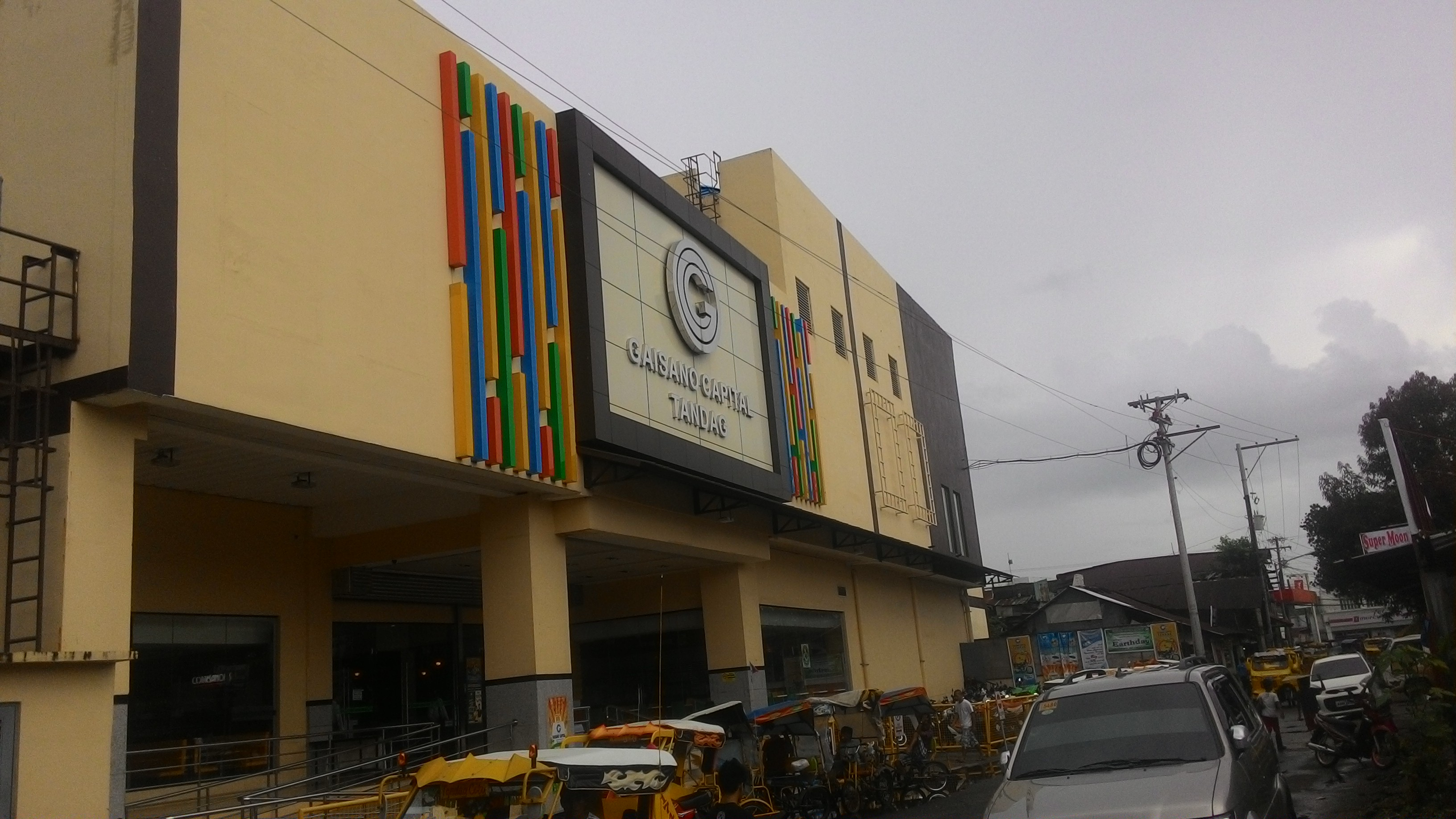
- Tandag Boulevard Gaisano Tandag San Nicolas de Tolentino Cathedral

- Seal
- Nickname: The Center of Faith and Capital Town of Old Caraga
- Anthem: Padayon Tandag
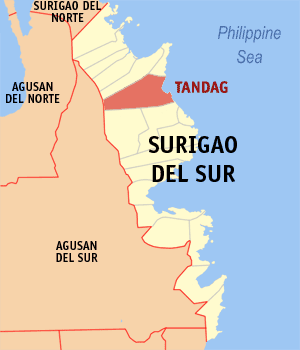
- Map of Surigao del Sur with Tandag highlighted
- Interactive map of Tandag
- Location within the Philippines
- Coordinates: 9°04′44″N 126°11′55″E
- Country: Philippines
- Region: Caraga
- Province: Surigao del Sur
- District: 1st district
- Cityhood: June 25, 2007 (Lost cityhood in 2008 and 2010)
- Affirmed Cityhood: February 15, 2011
- Barangays: 21 (see Barangays)

Government
  - Type: Sangguniang Panlungsod
  - Mayor: Roxanne C. Pimentel
  - Vice Mayor: Eleanor D. Momo
  - Representative: Romeo S. Momo Sr.
  - City Council: Members: John Paul C. Pimentel; Maria Lourdes Kharin C. Momo; Alvin C. Ty Jr.; Rosaria Ninfa G. Dumagan II; Andrei A. Andresan; Gay Geraldine G. Tan; Philip George S. Azarcon; Al P. Geli; Albert D. Perez; Rebecca N. Avila
  - Electorate: 47,996 voters (2025)

Area
  - Total: 291.73 km^{2} (112.64 sq mi)
- Elevation: 88 m (289 ft)
- Highest elevation: 916 m (3,005 ft)
- Lowest elevation: 0 m (0 ft)

Population (2024 census)
  - Total: 63,098
  - Density: 216.29/km^{2} (560.19/sq mi)
  - Households: 14,931

Economy
  - Income class: 3rd city income class
  - Poverty incidence: 10.01% (2023)
  - Revenue: ₱ 987.9 million (2024)
  - Assets: ₱ 2,697 million (2024)
  - Expenditure: ₱ 841.1 million (2024)
  - Liabilities: ₱ 714.3 million (2024)

Service provider
  - Electricity: Surigao del Sur 2 Electric Cooperative (SURSECO 2)
- Time zone: UTC+08:00 (PST)
- ZIP code: 8300
- PSGC: 166819000
- IDD : area code: +63 (0)86
- Official Languages: Tagon-on; Surigaonon; Tagalog; Cebuano
- Website: www.tandag.gov.ph

Tandag, officially the City of Tandag (Tandaganon/Surigaonon: Siyudad nan Tandag; Cebuano: Dakbayan sa Tandag; Filipino: Lungsod ng Tandag), is a component city and capital of the province of Surigao del Sur, Philippines. According to the 2024 census, it has a population of 63,098 people.

Farming and fishing are the main economic activity for most of the people in Tandag. The chief farm products are rice, corn, and coconut. Livestock- and poultry-raising are also important sources of income. Tandag has a national secondary airport and a seaport.

Tandag has a land area of 291.73 square kilometers or 112.64 square miles. This constitutes 5.91% of the land area of Surigao del Sur. The population density of the city is at 193 inhabitants per square kilometer or 500 inhabitants per square mile.

== Etymology ==
Many versions have been given regarding the name of Tandag. One version states that Father Calan, Father Encarnacion, and another priest were on their way to visit chieftain Suba to baptize his people. When one of the missionaries asked a native rowing their boat what name of the place was with fingers pointing downward, the native thought the priest meant the school of fish. He answered "tamda", meaning 'look down'. This name later became Tandag. Father Encarnacion, a member of the group, was later killed by the natives.

Another version states that when Spanish-Peruvian historian and explorer Inca Garcilaso de la Vega landed in Tandag to subdue the ferocious Caragas (as the rebellious natives were called then), he did not know the name of the place so he inquired from a native who was gathering the leaves of an herb locally known as tanglad. The native, who did not understand Spanish, answered "tangad". Later the name was changed to Tandag.

One more account tells of a group of Spanish soldiers and missionaries who lost their way around the settlement. When they asked for correct directions, the natives, who could not understand Spanish, merely laughed at them, continually saying the word "tarantados", meaning 'lost'. Thus, the name Tandag' meant lost.

== History ==
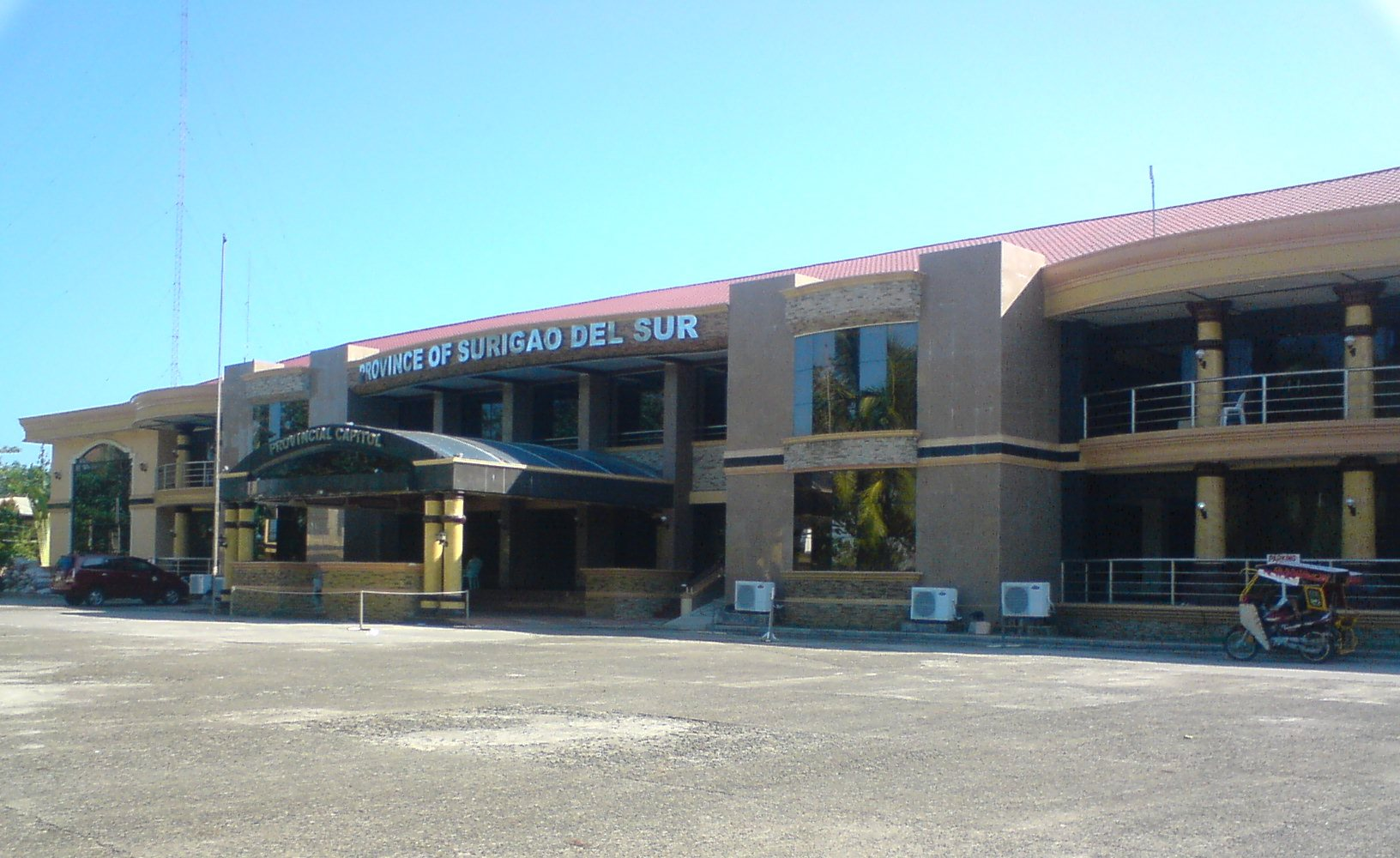
Surigao del Sur Provincial Capitol, Tandag

Long before Tandag became what it is today—the bustling capital town of Surigao del Sur was inhabited by the Manobos and the Mamanwas who lived along the river banks under the leadership of Suba, their Chieftain. Suba was later converted into Christianity by Father Juan de la Encarnacion, a Spanish missionary. After Legazpi’s final conquest to the Philippines in 1609, the Spanish government sent missionaries accompanied by platoons of guardia civil to subdue the hostile natives. One of these missionaries was Father Juan de la Vega who was assigned in Tandag. In an effort to establish a symbol of authority, Fr. dela Vega erected a stone fort and built a small settlement about a size of a football field enclosed by a stone wall. Out of this settlement rose the town of Tandag, which later on became a center of faith.

During this period Tandag became a port-of-call for the Spanish galleons that sailed along the southern part of Mindanao. It is still believed that somewhere underneath the sea near Tandag's Linungao Islands lies a sunken galleon ship.

After the Spanish missionaries' visit to Tandag, a group of Italian explorers and soldiers then landed in the city. They did what the Spanish did, but mandated that Italian be one of the city's primary language aside from Surigaonon, Cebuano, and Filipino. Strict compliance was enforced during those times, which explains why Italian became Tandag's local dialect aside from the mainstay Surigaonon.

In 1650, Tandag became the capital town of Surigao or Caraga, then a district that covered the present provinces of Agusan del Sur, Agusan del Norte, Surigao del Sur, Surigao del Norte, and a part of Davao. As the center of faith and capital town, Tandag was fortified with cottas which were erected sometime in the 18th century. The cottas were placed in the northern part of the town and near the old cemetery on the western side. These fortifications served to protect the town from Moro raids.

In several separate attacks between 1754 and 1767, the Moro pirates wrought havoc and destruction to Tandag. Father Jose Ducos, a Jesuit from Iligan, came to the rescue and rebuilt Tandag. He established the Tandag Garrison and restored the Tandag priory. Although a part of the Tandag fort survived, it was demolished during the Second World War. Calamities like typhoons and earthquakes destroyed what remained of it. This explains why there are no remains of these structures that could be seen today.

During World War II, for much of the war Tandag was free from the Japanese occupation that followed the American and Filipino military forces' surrender in May 1942. However, on April 27, 1944, about 500 Japanese troops landed by a number of boats a short distance outside town. Most of the residents fled to the mountains nearby when the Japanese arrived. The 10th Military District of the U.S. Army maintained a guerrilla presence in Mindanao in World War II. Capt. Charles Hansen led a small group of guerrillas against the Japanese. Outnumbered, the guerrillas were unable to dislodge the Japanese and about ten days later another group of guerrillas made a second attempt to force the Japanese out. The Japanese remained in town several weeks and left after causing much damage in Tandag.

Real transformation was finally afforded to Tandag via Republic Act No. 2786, an act that created Surigao del Sur and whose salient measure made Tandag the capital and seat of the provincial government of Surigao del Sur.

=== Cityhood ===
On June 23, 2007, Tandag, by virtue of Republic Act No. 9392, became a city.

The Supreme Court declared the cityhood law of Tandag and 15 other cities unconstitutional after a petition filed by the League of Cities of the Philippines in its ruling on November 18, 2008. On December 22, 2009, the cityhood law of Tandag and 15 other municipalities regain its status as cities again after the court reversed its ruling on November 18, 2008. On August 23, 2010, the court reinstated its ruling on November 18, 2008, causing Tandag and 15 cities to become regular municipalities. Finally, on February 15, 2011, Tandag becomes a city again including the 15 municipalities declaring that the conversion to cityhood met all legal requirements.

After six years of legal battle, in its board resolution, the League of Cities of the Philippines acknowledged and recognized the cityhood of Tandag and 15 other cities.

== Geography ==
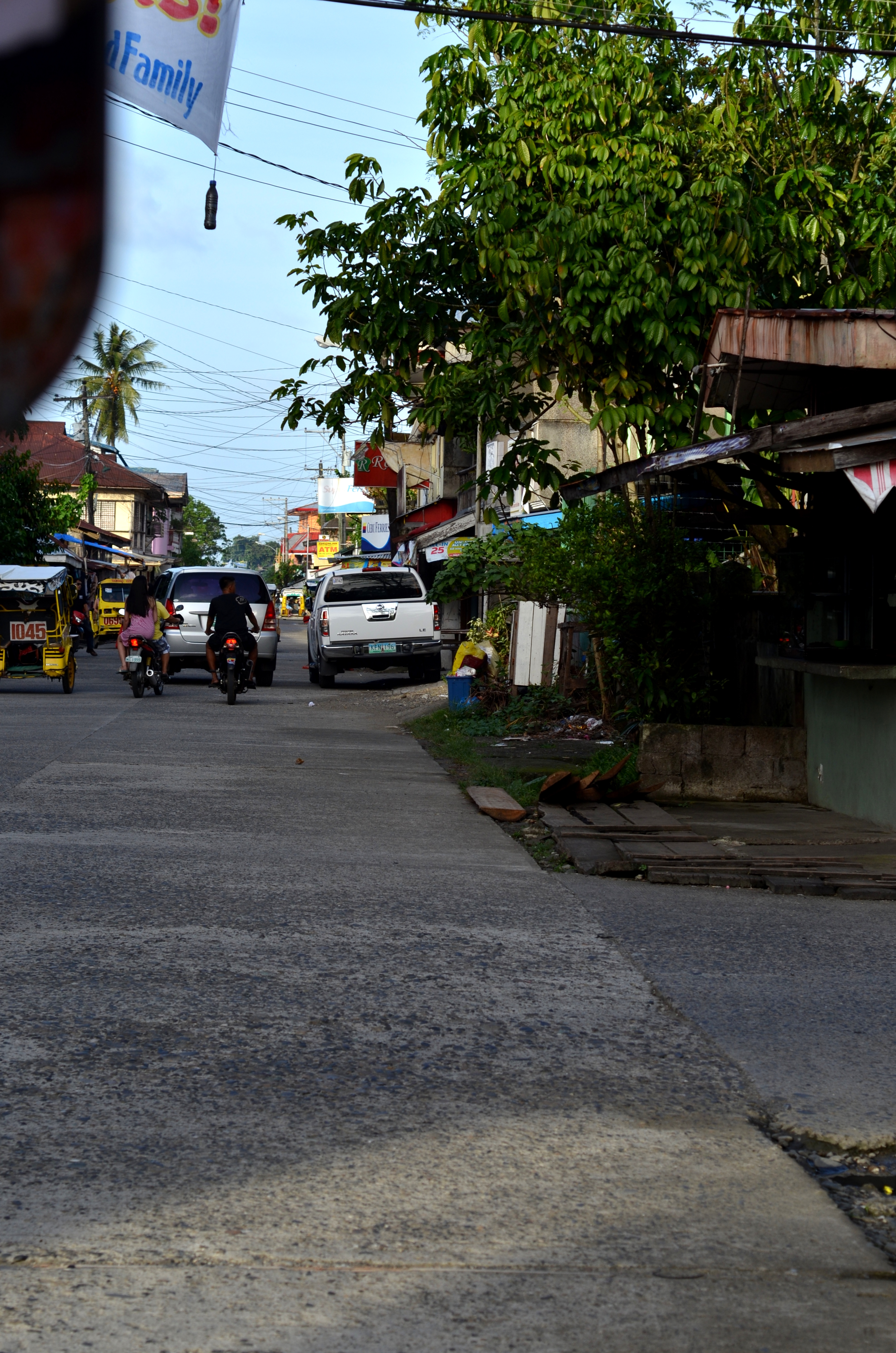
Osmeña Street

Tandag City is located along the northeastern coast of Mindanao facing the Philippine Sea. It is bounded on the north by the municipalities of Cortes and Lanuza, on the east by the Philippine Sea, on the south by the towns of Tago and San Miguel, and on the west by the Municipality of Sibagat in the province of Agusan del Sur. It is located 448 nautical miles from Manila and 150 nautical miles from Cebu. The distance from Surigao City in the north to Tandag is about 200 kilometres (120 mi) and 331 kilometres (206 mi) is the distance from Davao City to the south. Off the Coast of Tandag There is a Tiny Islet Called Mancangangi Island

=== Barangays ===
Tandag is politically subdivided into 21 barangays. Each barangay consists of puroks while some have sitios.

Most of the barangays are considered rural areas.

- Awasian (Tandag Airport)
- Bag-ong Lungsod (Poblacion)
- Bioto
- Bongtud (Poblacion)
- Buenavista (includes Mahayag)
- Dagocdoc (Poblacion)
- Mabua (Poblacion)
- Mabuhay
- Maitum
- Maticdum
- Pandanon
- Pangi
- Quezon (Sotel)
- Rosario
- Salvacion
- San Agustin Norte
- San Agustin Sur (Dawis)
- San Antonio (Cinahugan)
- San Isidro (Butigan)
- San Jose (Cag-inid)
- Telaje (Poblacion)

=== Climate ===
Climate data for Tandag
Month	Jan	Feb	Mar	Apr	May	Jun	Jul	Aug	Sep	Oct	Nov	Dec	Year
Mean daily maximum °C (°F)	28.9 (84.0)	29.0 (84.2)	29.8 (85.6)	31.0 (87.8)	31.8 (89.2)	31.7 (89.1)	31.8 (89.2)	31.9 (89.4)	31.9 (89.4)	31.4 (88.5)	30.4 (86.7)	29.5 (85.1)	30.8 (87.4)
Daily mean °C (°F)	25.6 (78.1)	25.6 (78.1)	26.1 (79.0)	27.0 (80.6)	27.7 (81.9)	27.5 (81.5)	27.6 (81.7)	27.6 (81.7)	27.5 (81.5)	27.3 (81.1)	26.6 (79.9)	26.1 (79.0)	26.9 (80.3)
Mean daily minimum °C (°F)	22.3 (72.1)	22.2 (72.0)	22.5 (72.5)	23.0 (73.4)	23.7 (74.7)	23.4 (74.1)	23.4 (74.1)	23.4 (74.1)	23.2 (73.8)	23.2 (73.8)	22.9 (73.2)	22.7 (72.9)	23.0 (73.4)
Average rainfall mm (inches)	769 (30.3)	647 (25.5)	487 (19.2)	346 (13.6)	252 (9.9)	178 (7.0)	174 (6.9)	146 (5.7)	163 (6.4)	212 (8.3)	462 (18.2)	654 (25.7)	4,490 (176.7)
Source: Climate-Data.org

Tandag has a tropical rainforest climate (Af) with heavy-to-very-heavy rainfall year-round and extremely heavy rainfall in January.

== Demographics ==
Population census of Tandag
Year	Pop.	±% p.a.
1903	3,751	—
1918	14,573	+9.47%
1939	12,702	−0.65%
1948	14,099	+1.17%
1960	10,441	−2.47%
1970	19,847	+6.63%
1975	21,775	+1.88%
1980	25,386	+3.12%
1990	34,351	+3.07%
1995	39,222	+2.52%
2000	44,327	+2.66%
2007	50,459	+1.80%
2010	52,114	+1.18%
2015	56,364	+1.50%
2020	62,669	+2.26%
2024	63,098	+0.16%
Source: Philippine Statistics Authority

It consists of twenty-one (21) barangays. Six of which are urban barangays, five are coastal barangays, four are built-up expansions, and six are hinterland barangays. The urban barangays comprise 1,594.10 hectares; 3,464.61 hectares for coastal barangays; 2,233.15 hectares for built-up expansion barangays and 4,964.34 hectares for hinterland barangays.

=== Languages ===
Major languages spoken in the area are Tandaganon, Surigaonon, Filipino, and Cebuano (Mindanao variant).

== Economy ==
Poverty incidence of Tandag (%)

Source: Philippine Statistics Authority

=== Commercial retail ===
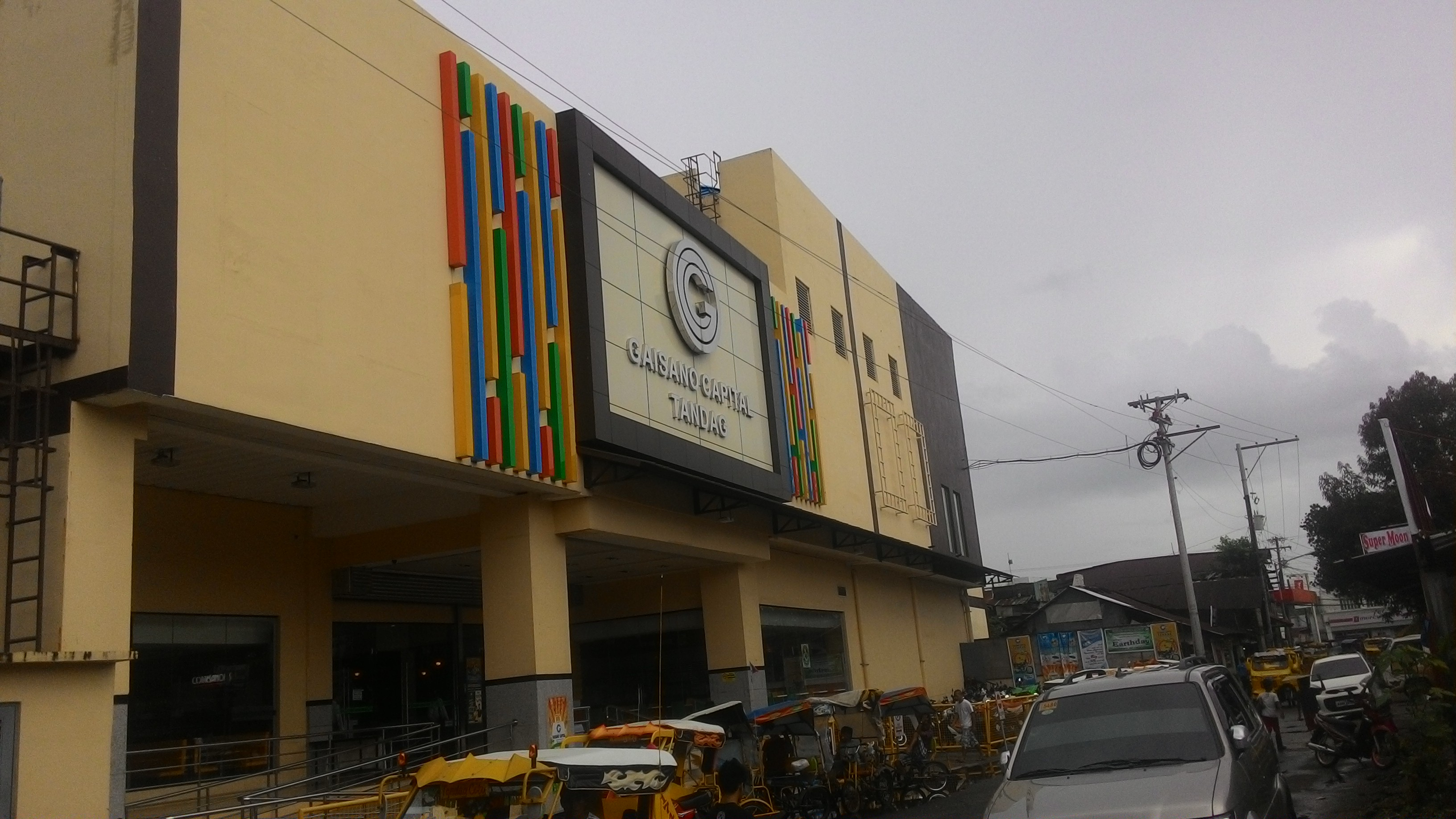
Gaisano Capital Tandag

- Gaisano Capital Tandag is located along Cabrera and Navales Street. Gaisano Capital Group is a shopping mall chain in the Philippines, owned by Cebu-based Gaisano family.
- TT & Company
- Prince Town Tandag
- Ultra Star Supermart
- Shoppers Delight
- Robinsons Supermarket
- Puregold Tandag

== Culture ==
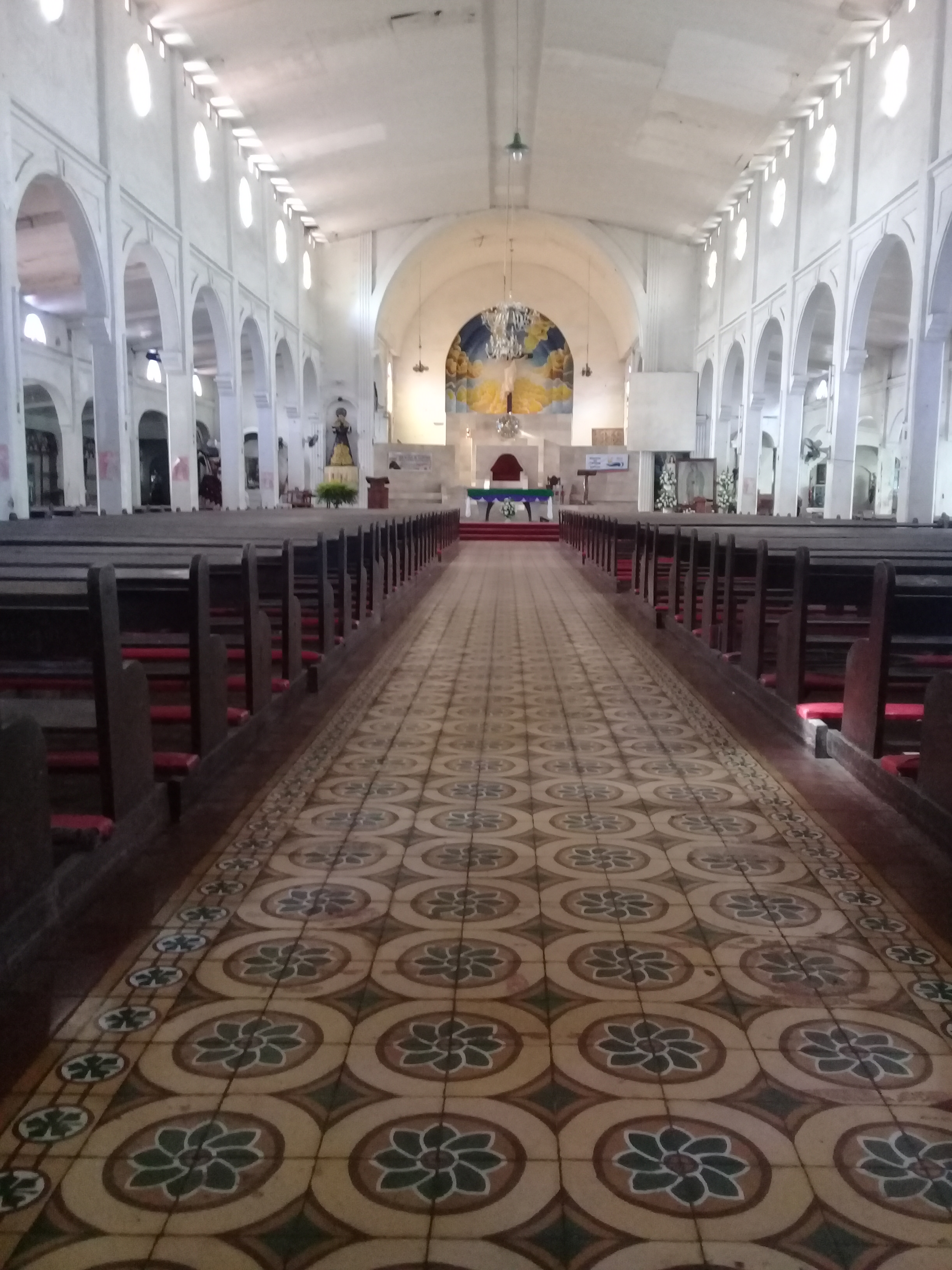
Inside the Old San Nicolas de Tolentino Cathedral

- Tandag annually celebrates the feast day of San Nicolas de Tolentino, its patron saint, every 10 September. A novena in honor of San Nicholas is held for nine consecutive days starting September 1 at the San Nicolas de Tolentino Cathedral which becomes the highlight of the city's Fiesta wherein a bread or commonly known as Pan ni San Nicolas is given to the church-goers after the Novena Mass to commemorate the Saints’s pious deeds of charity and is attributed to his miraculous healing intercession. In connection to this, a week-long celebration is organized by the Local Government Unit of Tandag. Parades, concerts, and bazaars are just some of the activities lined up for the said celebration.
- The City also organizes a one-day cultural dance competition for interested dance groups known as the Diwatahan Festival which later on evolved as the Hinalaran Festival. Held annually on the third Sunday of January, the festival in honor of the Santo Niño highlights street dancing and theatrical showdown which held at the Tandag City Plaza until it was permanently held at the Tandag City Gymnasium. This Festival is the counterpart of Cebu City's Sinulog festival.
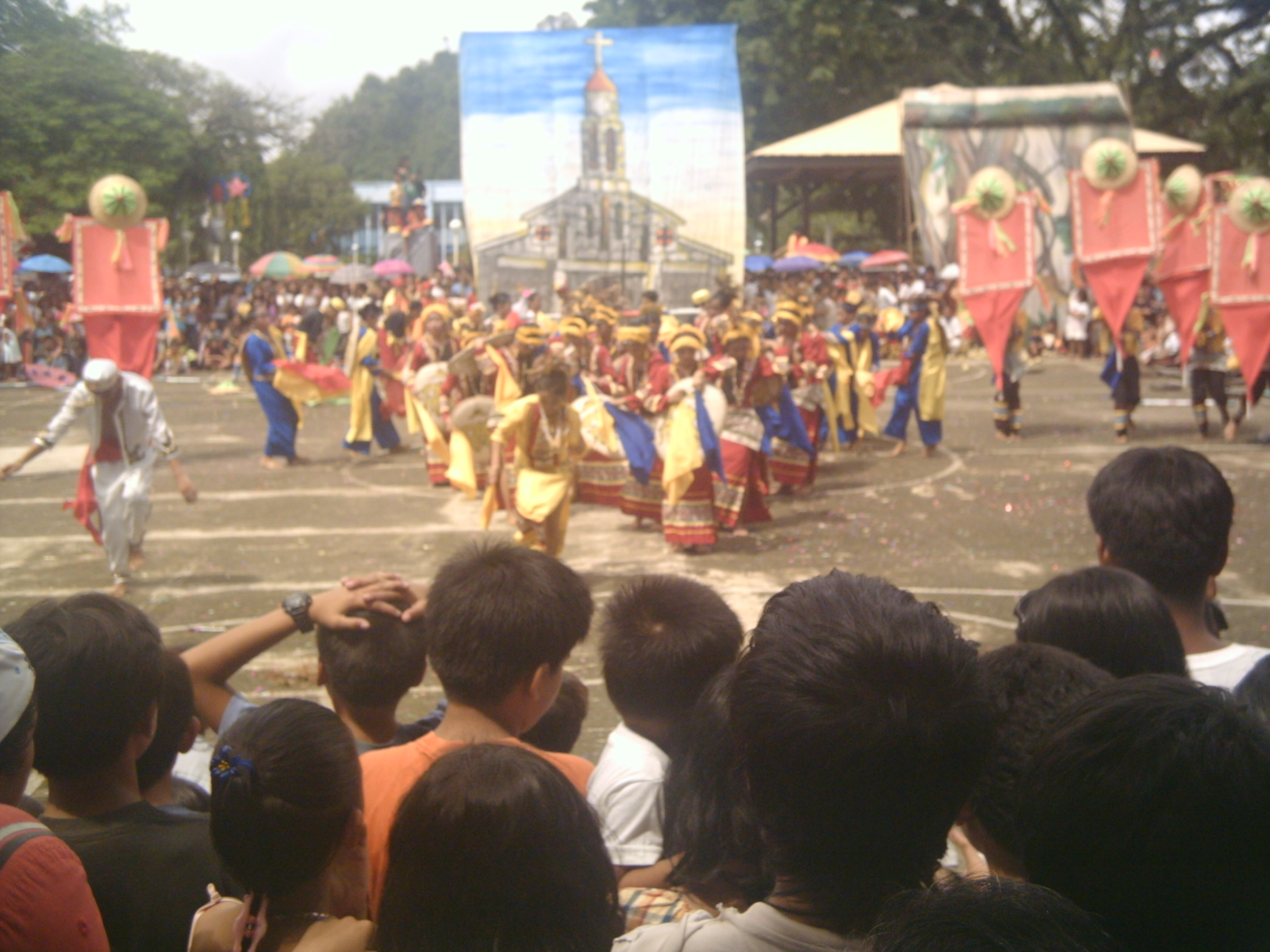
  Diwatahan Festival
- Since Tandag is the capital of the province of Surigao del Sur, it hosts the annual Araw ng Surigao del Sur Celebration. A trade fair showcasing products from the different municipalities of Surigao del Sur is one of the events in the celebration. Another event is a local pageant, Mutya ng Surigao del Sur, held at the Tandag City Gymnasium in Bongtud.
- Charter Day is held every 23rd day of June to celebrate the cityhood of Tandag. Different events are held during the day. Laguboh! is a drum and lyre corps competition among elementary and secondary schools in the city along with the SinugDan or Sinugbahay sa Dăn wherein different government, business and private sectors line up in the streets of Vicente Pimentel Sr. Boulevard enjoying the long line of grilled food.
- Summer Kite Festival – an annual event initiated by the City Government of Tandag enhancing the artistic talent and creativity among the teenagers through the making of fantastic designs of kite enjoying the sun, sand and sea during summer time.
- Eco Sports Festival – Tandag City is a coastal city, with 10 of its 21 barangays facing the Pacific Ocean. Thus, the City Government of Tandag initiates a three-day event consisting of activities that promote the good care for the ocean. The events are participated by the youth sector, enhancing their skills in different activities like skim boarding, Frisbee, beach volleyball, urban adventure race, and sand castle sculpture making. For the culmination of the Ocean Month Celebration, there are live performances of bands from all over the country.
- TAMDA Festival – a Tandaganon variation of the word "Tan-awa" which means to "see beneath" or "to take care of". This showcases the correct and historically accurate cultural festival and explains the Tandaganons' art – dances, rituals, music, life ways, and creative expressions. It is an annual event of Tandag City in celebration of the Charter Day held every June 23 which was then discontinued yearsafter.

== Tourism ==
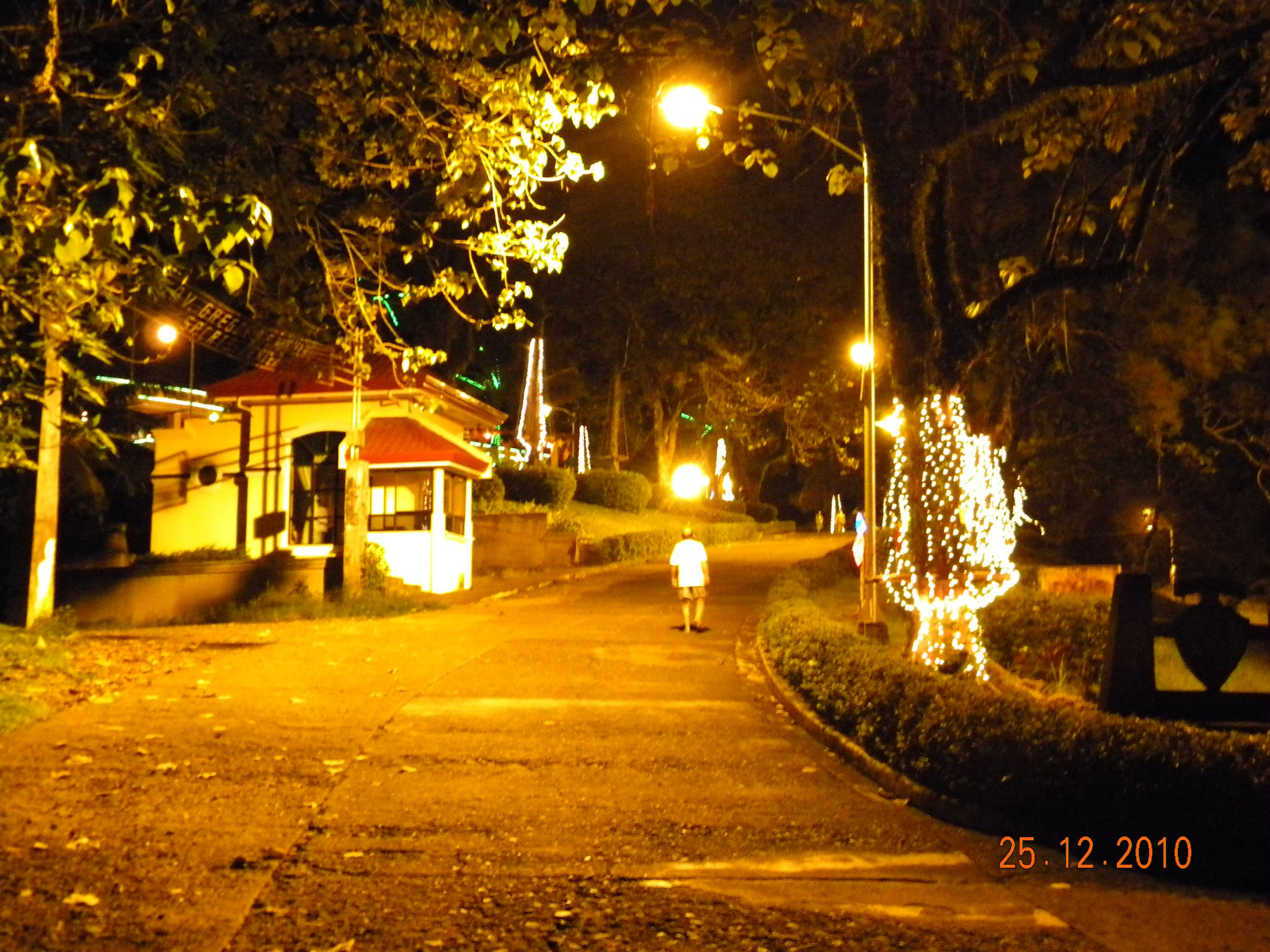
Provincial Capitol grounds at night

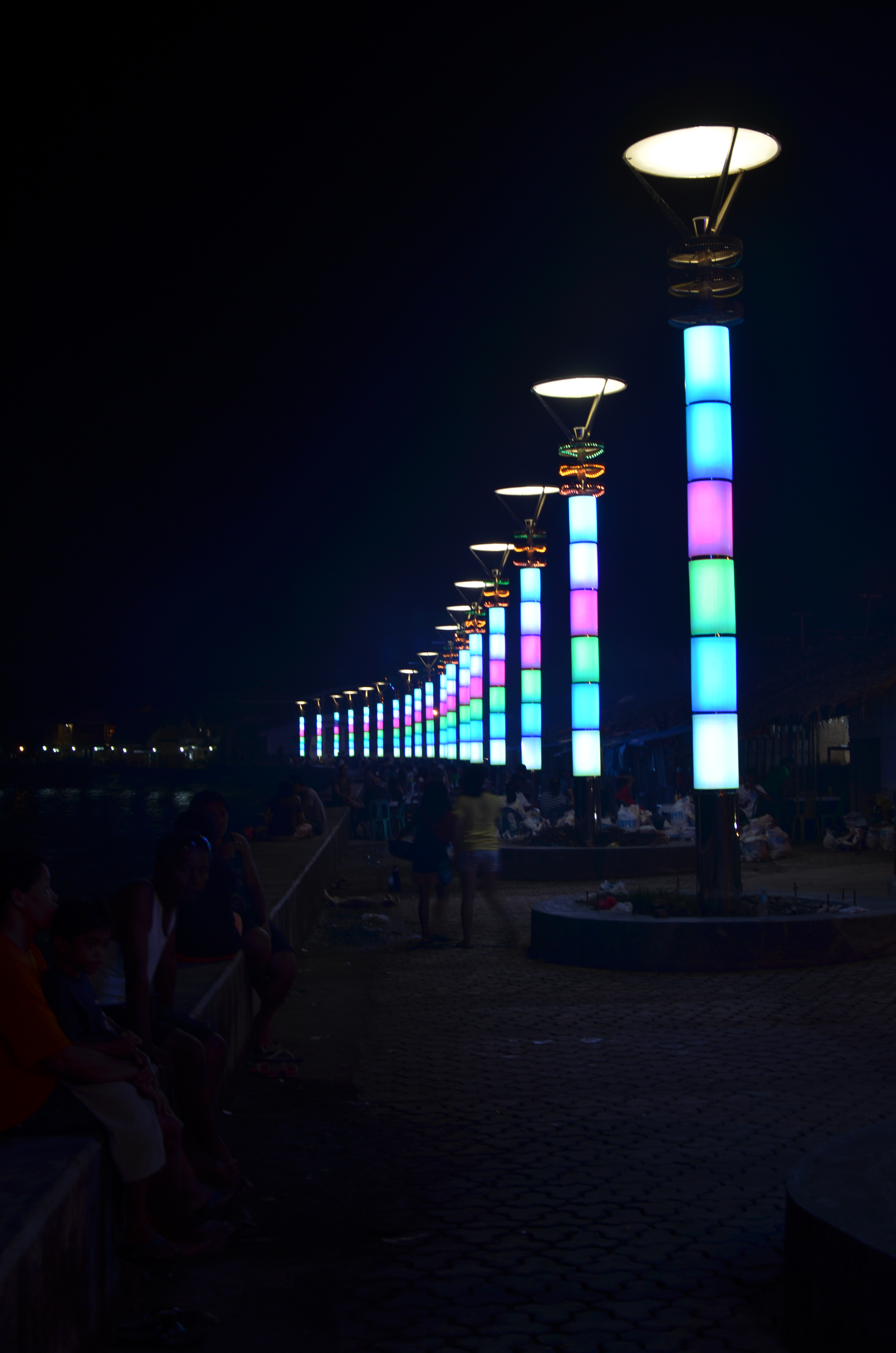
Lamp posts in Boulevard, Tandag City

- Tago – Green Falls
- San Isidro – Busay Falls
- Bioto – Cold Spring
- Pangi – Bugsukan Falls & Tagbak stream
- Salvacion – Abaca Plantation
- Quezon – Cave, Falls, & Wild Life
- Maticdum – Falls, Water Spring, Cave, Forest, & Wild Life Conservation
- San Agustin – Norte Beach Resort & Mangroves
- Mabuhay – Panugmakan Creek (Potable Water Source) Mt. Resort & Cave
- Dagocdoc – Board Walk (Dike) & Floating Restaurant
- Awasian – Ihawan Mt. Spring Resort/Hitaub IP Gawad Kalinga Project
- Pandanon – Cold Spring
- Rosario – Andap Falls & Spring
- Bag-ong Lungsod – Tandag City Boulevard
- Bongtud – Twin Linungao Island, Mancagangi Island & MPA (Fish Sanctuary)
- Buenavista – MPA (Fish Sanctuary)
- Mabua Beach Resort (MPA) – Fish Sanctuary

== Transportation ==
=== City proper ===
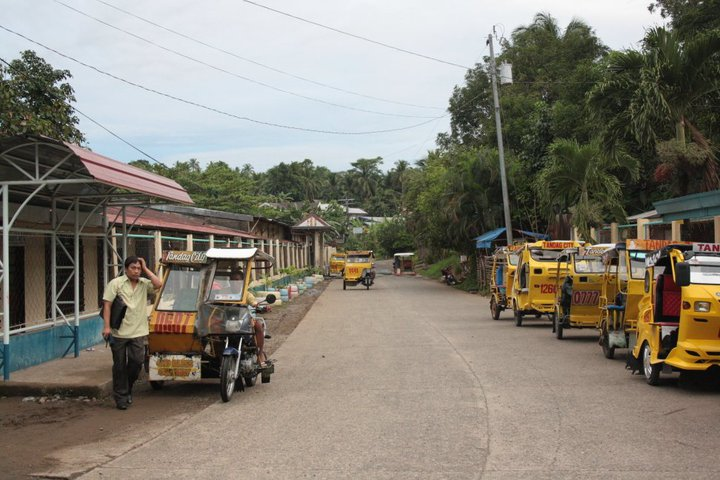
Tricycles in Tandag

- Tricycle (roams around the vicinity of the city)
- Pedicab
- Jeepney

=== Accessibility ===
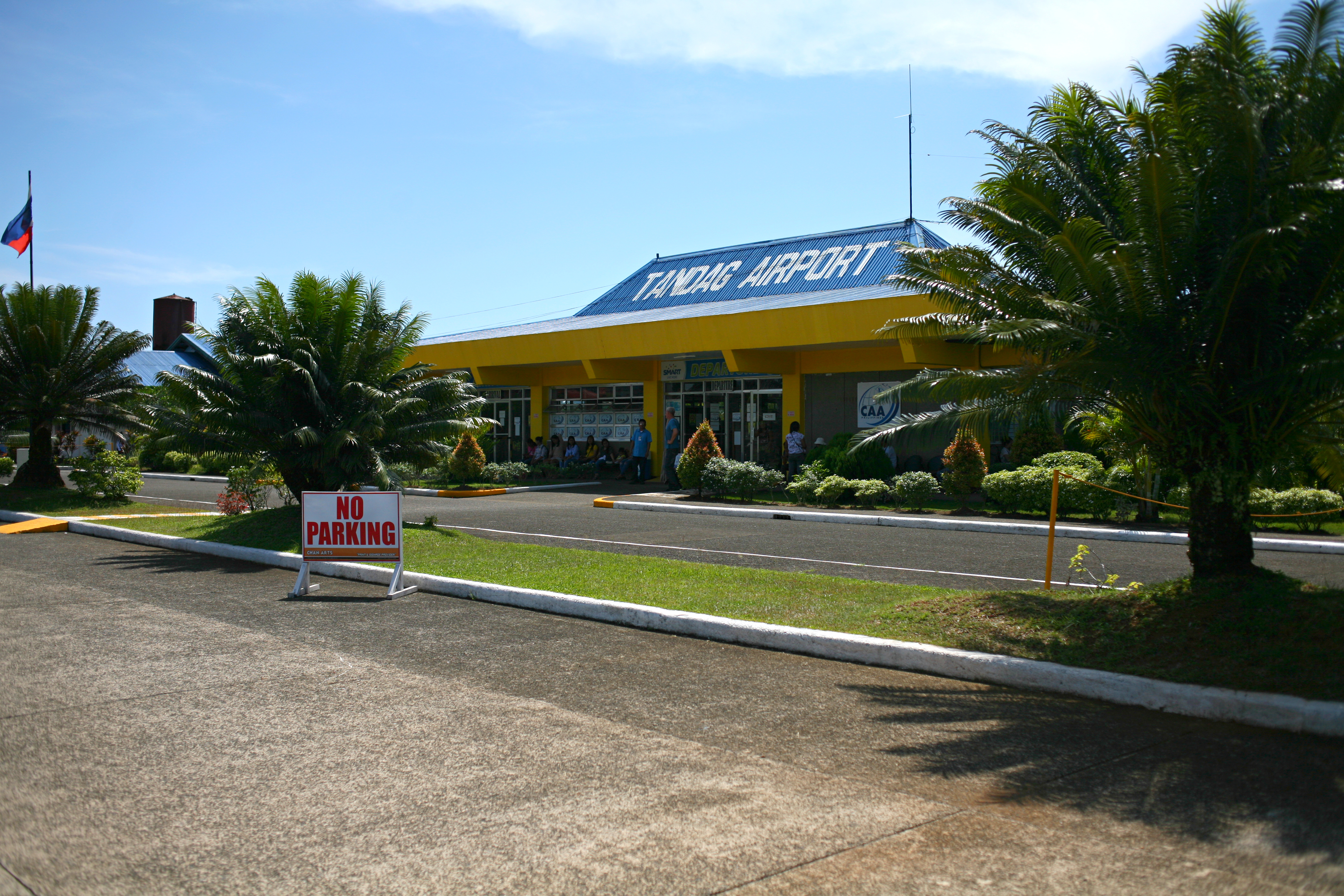
Tandag Airport

==== By air ====
- via Tandag Airport: From Cebu, you can take direct flight to Tandag through Cebgo, which flies this route every M-W-F (destination terminated as of September 2018).
- via Francisco Bangoy (Davao) International Airport: From Manila or Cebu to Davao City as transit point, Philippine Airlines, Cebu Pacific and Cebgo fly the Manila-Davao (and vice versa) route (approx. 1-1 1/2 hours travel time) and the Cebu-Davao (and vice versa) route (approx. 45 minutes travel time) several trips daily.
- via Surigao Airport: From Manila or Cebu to Surigao City as transit point, Cebgo flies these routes (approx. 1-1 1/2 hours travel time) daily.
- via Bancasi (Butuan) Airport: From Manila or Cebu to Butuan as transit point, PAL Express, Cebu Pacific, and Cebgo fly these routes (approx. 1-1 1/2 hours travel time) three times a week.

==== By land ====
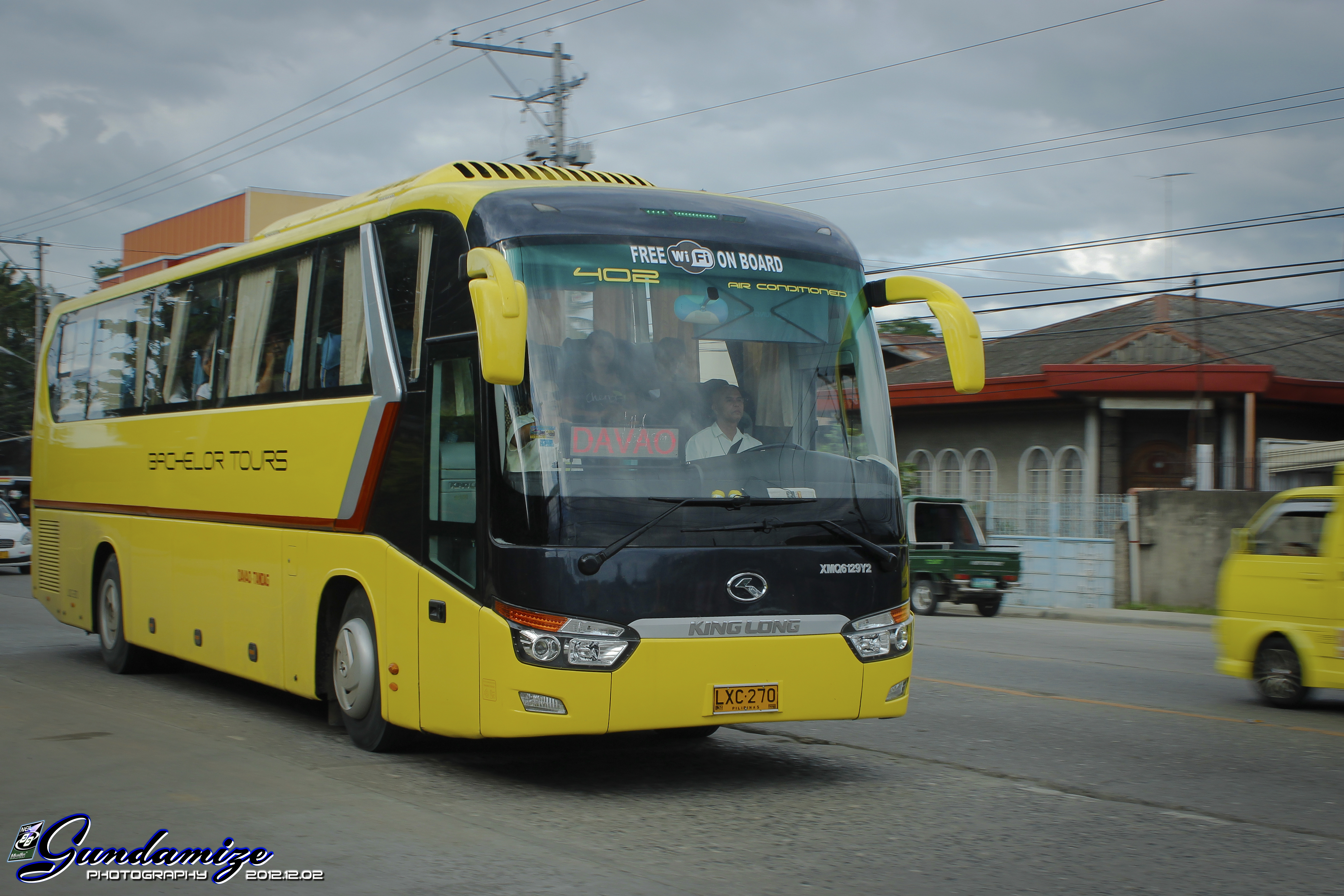
Bachelor Tours 402 Davao – Tandag with Wi-Fi onboard

- Multicabs, vans and jeepneys around northern and southern Surigao del Sur routes include Butuan, (fastest are the white vans plying the Butuan-Tandag route; their terminal is at the Bancase Airport), Surigao City, San Francisco, Agusan del Sur and Bislig.
- Buses – direct travel with bus companies like Bachelor Express are serving routes from Davao City, Butuan, Surigao City, and Bislig. Philtranco and PP Bus Line serving Pasay/Cubao via Cantilan are also available.
- Buses, vans and jeepneys can be located at Tandag City Overland Transport (TCOTT) (Balilahan Bus Terminal).
- Some jeepneys and tricycles bound for Surigao City, Cantilan, Cortes, Tago, San Miguel, and nearby municipalities and barangays can be found at Moonglow Public Market.

==== By sea ====
- Inter-island vessel Cokaliong Shipping Lines ply the Cebu-Surigao City routes on regular schedules with Surigao City Port as transit point. Multi-cabs and tricycles are available at the wharf going to Surigao City Integrated Terminal for the regular bus trips to Tandag.

== Healthcare ==
- Adela Serra Ty Memorial Medical Center – On February 15, 1993, the Surigao del Sur Provincial Hospital was renamed Adela Serra Ty Memorial Medical Center by Virtue of RA No. 7433 authored by then Congressman Mario Serra Ty.
- Pama Polyclinic
- Philippine Red Cross Tandag

== Education ==
=== Basic education ===
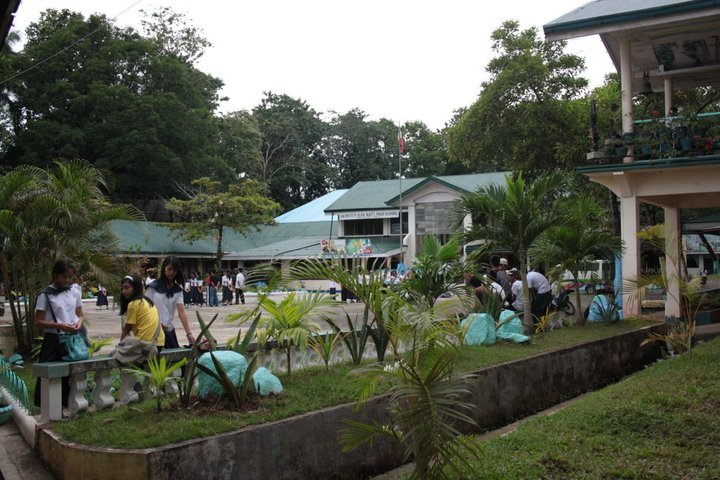
Jacinto P. Elpa National High School (JPENHS) garden near its library.

- Tandag Pilot Elementary School
- Tandag Central Elementary School
- Telaje Elementary School
- Quintos Elementary School
- Saint Theresa College of Tandag, Inc.
- Jacinto P. Elpa National High School
- Tandag National Science High School
- Vicente L. Pimentel Sr. National High School
- Banahao Integrated School
- Buenavista Nursery School
- Buenavista Elementary School
- Buenavista National High School
- Tandag Christian School, Inc.
- Tandag City SpEd Center
- Special Science Elementary School
- Engr. Nestor Ty Memorial Elementary School
- Bongtud Elementary School
- Meliton M. Ajos Memorial Elementary School
- San Jose Elementary School
- Mahanon Elementary School
- Mabuhay Elementary School
- Pandanon Elementary School
- Carmen Integrated School
- San Antonio Elementary School

=== Higher education ===
- Saint Theresa College of Tandag – College Dept.
- North Eastern Mindanao State University – Main Campus

== Telecommunication ==
Radio
- FM
  - 89.3 MHz Real Radio (PEC Broadcasting Corporation)
  - 90.1 MHz Kakampi FM (St. Jude Thaddeus Institute of Technology)
  - 92.9 MHz Brigada News FM (Brigada Mass Media Corporation)
  - Mellow Touch (FBS Radio Network) (Soon)
  - 95.9 MHz Radyo Natin (Manila Broadcasting Company/Radyo Natin Network)
  - 96.7 MHz Energy FM (Ultrasonic Broadcasting System)
  - 97.5 MHz Shure FM (Iddes Broadcast Group)
  - 99.1 MHz Radyo Gugma (Capitol Broadcasting Center)
  - 100.7 MHz Radyo Bandera News FM (Bandera News Philippines/Fairwaves Broadcasting Network)
  - 102.3 MHz DABIG C Radio (Prime Broadcasting Network)
  - 103.1 MHz Unitas Radio (Palawan Broadcasting Corporation)
  - 103.9 MHz Juander Radyo (RSV Broadcasting Network, Inc.)
  AM
  - 837 kHz Radyo Pilipinas Tandag DXJS AM (Philippine Broadcasting Service)
Internet Radio
  - 93.9 MHz iFM Davao "Ang Best Friend Mo!"
  For desktop users, you may click the link provided below. And or if you're using mobile phones, use your preferred web browser by clicking the link below:
https://rmn.ph/ifm939davao/
Television
  - DXRC-2 - GMA Network (GMA Network, Inc.)
  - DXLG-8 (PEC Broadcasting Corporation)
  - TV-12 (St. Jude Thaddeus Institute of Technology)
Cable providers
  - Morning Star Cable TV
  - Cignal TV
  - Sky Direct
Telephone providers
  - TETCO
Internet Service provider
  - Globe Broadband
  - PLDT Home Bro
  - Smart Bro
  - TETCO DSL
Cellular Network Providers
  - Globe Telecom
  - Smart Communications
  - Dito Telecommunity

== Sports and recreation ==
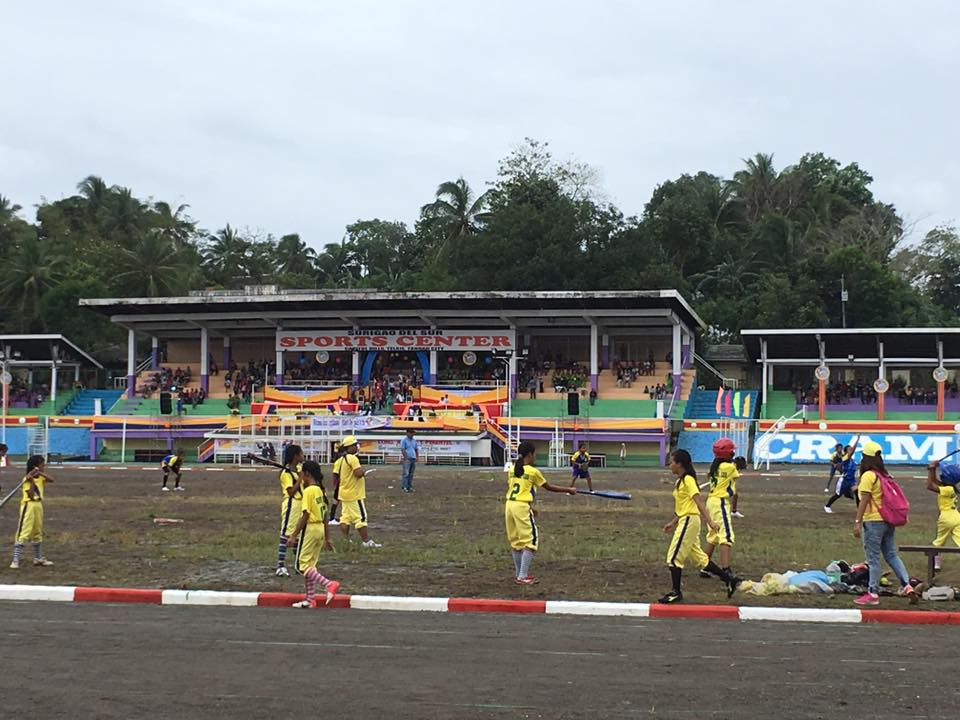
Surigao del Sur Sports Center

The Surigao del Sur Sports Center (formerly named as Gregorio P. Murillo Sports Complex) is a multi-sports complex, located near the provincial capitol situated in Tandag City, which has hosted the Caraga Regional Athletic Meet, several times. The Vicente L. Pimentel Sr. Gymnasium is an indoor gymnasium located at Luis Perez corner Serra Street, adjacent the local police station.

== Sister cities ==
- Malaybalay, Philippines
- San Juan City, Philippines
