= Agaese Tago =

American Samoan politician

Member of the American Samoa House of Representatives
- In office 1976–1977

Personal details
- Born: January 27, 1939
- Died: August 8, 2017 (aged 78) San Mateo, California, U.S.
- Education: Harvard Kennedy School

Agaese "Ace" Tago (January 27, 1939 – August 8, 2017) was an American Samoa politician. He served a member of the American Samoa House of Representatives from 1976 to 1977. He would also serve as the Treasurer of American Samoa under Peter Tali Coleman and would later be the Comptroller for Oakland, California.
