= Tago, Surigao del Sur =

Municipality in Surigao del Sur, Philippines

Tago
- Municipality
- Municipality of Tago
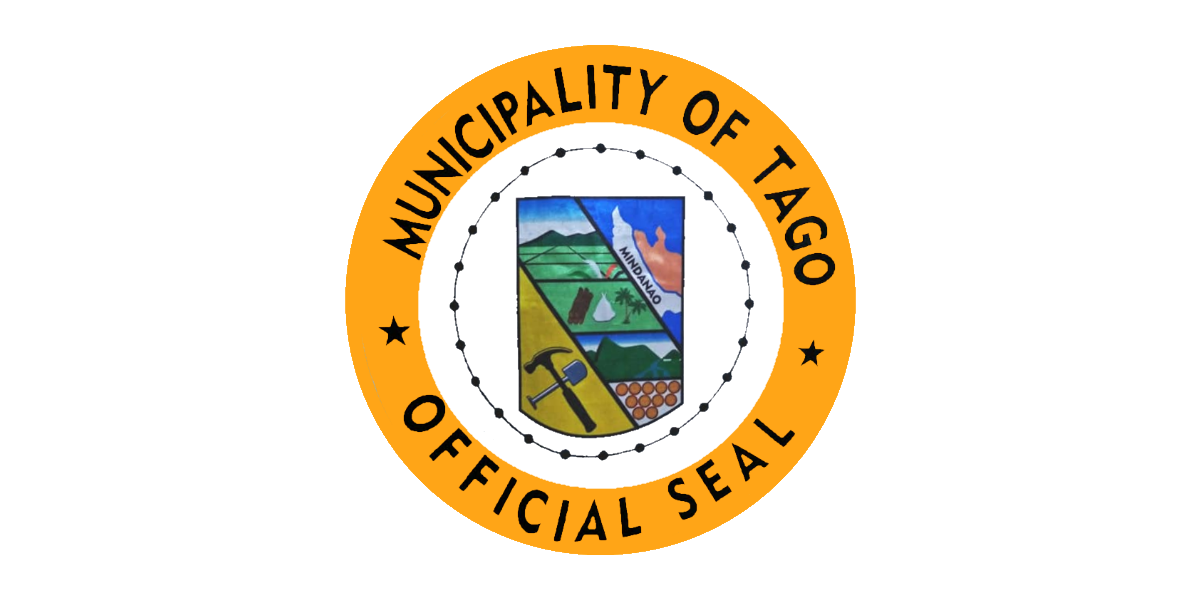
- Flag Seal

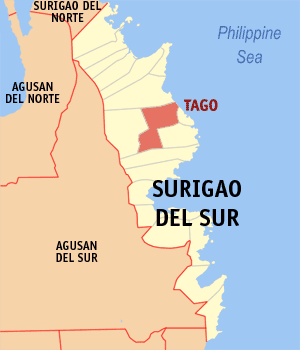
- Map of Surigao del Sur with Tago highlighted
- Interactive map of Tago
- Location within the Philippines
- Coordinates: 9°01′09″N 126°14′00″E
- Country: Philippines
- Region: Caraga
- Province: Surigao del Sur
- District: 1st district
- Founded: November 6, 1918
- Barangays: 24 (see Barangays)

Government
  - Type: Sangguniang Bayan
  - Mayor: Jelio Val C. Laurente
  - Vice Mayor: Ira Pimentel
  - Representative: Romeo S. Momo Sr.
  - Electorate: 29,325 voters (2025)

Area
  - Total: 253.28 km^{2} (97.79 sq mi)
- Elevation: 6.0 m (19.7 ft)
- Highest elevation: 87 m (285 ft)
- Lowest elevation: 0 m (0 ft)

Population (2024 census)
  - Total: 40,097
  - Density: 158.31/km^{2} (410.02/sq mi)
  - Households: 9,285

Economy
  - Income class: 1st municipal income class
  - Poverty incidence: 16.49% (2023)
  - Revenue: ₱ 229.8 million (2024)
  - Assets: ₱ 460.1 million (2024)
  - Expenditure: ₱ 111.3 million (2024)
  - Liabilities: ₱ 146.6 million (2024)

Service provider
  - Electricity: Surigao del Sur 2 Electric Cooperative (SURSECO 2)
- Time zone: UTC+8 (PST)
- ZIP code: 8302
- PSGC: 1606818000
- IDD : area code: +63 (0)86
- Native languages: Surigaonon; Agusan; Cebuano; Tagalog
- Website: www.tago.gov.ph

Tago, officially the Municipality of Tago (Surigaonon: Lungsod nan Tago; Tagalog: Bayan ng Tago), is a municipality in the province of Surigao del Sur, Philippines. According to the 2024 census, it has a population of 40,097 people.

== History ==
The Municipality of Tago was born thrice because of the precariousness of political times back then. It saw the light of day for the first time in 1865 under the Maura Law of the Spanish Regime that lasted for three years. Tago must have reverted to its barrio status because records had it that for the second time, it regained its municipal status on August 23, 1883, just after it transferred from the so-called Daan Lungsod (Old Town), which was perennially flooded, to the place called Laguna. When the Philippine Revolution broke out in 1896, Tago was again reverted to its barrio status.

About the middle of the First World War, the people of Tago grew politically minded and in the summer of 1916, important leaders of then Barrio of Tago like Catalino Pareja, Calixtro Espinoza, Simon Luna, Miguel Montero, Juan L. Garcia, Feleciano Arquiza, Juan Pimentel, Lorenzo Elizalde, Canuto Consuegra, Lino Montero, Isidro Garcia, Pastor Cabrera, Bernardo Falcon, Felipe Lozada and Felix Rodrigues were determined to wrestle Tago's political independence away from the mother Municipality of Tandag.

This breed of local leaders then submitted a duly signed petition to the Municipal Council of Tandag. But wanting the petition to gain more support, Catalino Pareja, along with councilors Lino Montero, Isidro Garcia and Zacarias Espinoza, sent the resolution directly to the Provincial Board of Surigao which in turn endorsed it to the Governor General in Manila.

The crude transportation system during that time made the Provincial Governor Ricardo Gonzales incur delays in sending the petition to Governor General Francis Burton Harrison. But faced with numerous pressing matters to attend to, Harrison issued Executive Order No. 41 only on November 6, 1918, thus converting Tago, for the third time, from being a barrio to a newborn town.

Appointed Municipal President effective January 1, 1919, was then Councilor Catalino Pareja with Calixtro Espinoza as Vice Municipal President while Messrs. Feleciano Arquiza, Juan L. Garcia, Lorenzo Elizalde and Canuto Consuegra were appointed as Municipal Councilors. On the same year, the first election was conducted and Catalino Pareja and Lino Montero were elected as Municipal President and Vice Municipal President respectively.

During much of World War II Tago remained free from Japanese occupation. In late April 1944 the Japanese occupied Tago. The Japanese caused much damage there when their first patrol entered town. In early May guerrillas affiliated with the 10th Military District of the U.S. Army attacked the Japanese. Eight Japanese were killed, but the guerrillas were unable to dislodge them. The Japanese remained until 1945 and left many houses destroyed.

== Geography ==
Tago is located in the central part of Surigao del Sur facing the Pacific Ocean. It lies between 126 degrees 12 minutes longitude and 9 degrees minutes north latitude. It is bounded on the north by the Capital Town of Tandag, on the north-west by Municipality of Lanuza, on the west by Municipality of San Miguel, on the southeast by the Municipality of Bayabas and on the south by the Municipalities of Cagwait and Marihatag.

=== Land area ===
Tago sits on a 343.52 km^{2} of land which is about 7.55% of the total area of Surigao del Sur. In terms of area, Barangay Cabangahan is the largest with 20% of Tago's land area while Barangay Purisima is the smallest with 1.51%.

=== Soil ===
Tago's soil types vary; along the shoreline is sandy. Barangays Victoria and Dayoan have Bantug clay; Barangays Gamut, Kinabigtasan, Sumo-Sumo, Adlay and Anahao Daan have Butuan clay; while Bajao, Alba, Cayale, Bangsud and Anahao Bag-o have silt loam. Matho clay can be found in most of the mountain ranges from the seashore to the boundaries of Tandag-Tago and Tago-San Miguel.

=== Slope ===
Roughly 50% of Tago's land area is relatively flat terrain (0-3%) while roughly 30%, mostly in the north-western portion, are steep mountains.

=== Climate ===
Climate data for Tago
Month	Jan	Feb	Mar	Apr	May	Jun	Jul	Aug	Sep	Oct	Nov	Dec	Year
Mean daily maximum °C (°F)	28.9 (84.0)	29.0 (84.2)	29.9 (85.8)	31.0 (87.8)	31.7 (89.1)	31.8 (89.2)	31.7 (89.1)	31.9 (89.4)	31.9 (89.4)	31.4 (88.5)	30.5 (86.9)	29.5 (85.1)	30.8 (87.4)
Daily mean °C (°F)	25.5 (77.9)	25.6 (78.1)	26.2 (79.2)	27.0 (80.6)	27.6 (81.7)	27.6 (81.7)	27.4 (81.3)	27.6 (81.7)	27.5 (81.5)	27.2 (81.0)	26.7 (80.1)	26.0 (78.8)	26.8 (80.3)
Mean daily minimum °C (°F)	22.2 (72.0)	22.2 (72.0)	22.5 (72.5)	23.0 (73.4)	23.6 (74.5)	23.4 (74.1)	23.2 (73.8)	23.4 (74.1)	23.2 (73.8)	23.1 (73.6)	22.9 (73.2)	22.6 (72.7)	22.9 (73.3)
Average rainfall mm (inches)	747 (29.4)	629 (24.8)	470 (18.5)	335 (13.2)	256 (10.1)	180 (7.1)	180 (7.1)	150 (5.9)	166 (6.5)	210 (8.3)	455 (17.9)	638 (25.1)	4,416 (173.9)
Source: Climate-Data.org

Tago has a tropical rainforest climate (Af) with heavy to very heavy rainfall year-round and with extremely heavy rainfall in January.

=== Barangays ===
Tago is politically subdivided into 24 barangays. Each barangay consists of puroks while some have sitios.

- Alba
- Anahao Bag-o
- Anahao Daan
- Badong
- Bajao
- Bangsud
- Cabangahan
- Cagdapao
- Camagong
- Caras-an
- Cayale
- Dayo-an
- Gamut
- Jubang
- Kinabigtasan
- Layog
- Lindoy
- Mercedes
- Purisima (Poblacion)
- Sumo-sumo
- Umbay
- Unaban
- Unidos
- Victoria

== Demographics ==
Population census of Tago
Year	Pop.	±% p.a.
1903	5,172	—
1939	15,271	+3.05%
1948	23,036	+4.67%
1960	21,346	−0.63%
1970	17,550	−1.94%
1975	19,693	+2.34%
1980	21,192	+1.48%
1990	23,987	+1.25%
1995	27,100	+2.31%
2000	29,721	+2.00%
2007	31,342	+0.74%
2010	33,993	+3.00%
2015	35,329	+0.74%
2020	39,831	+2.56%
2024	40,097	+0.16%
Source: Philippine Statistics Authority

Tago recorded an average growth rate of 2.3% from 1980 to 1990. But because of out-migration arising from lack of job opportunities, it had gone down to 1.86% between the periods 1995 and 2000. Among the barangays, Victoria registered the highest growth rate at 6.12% due to in-migration, the area being home to the Surigao del Sur Polytechnic State College while Barangay Mercedes posted a negative growth (-0.28%).

=== Population density ===
Population density is placed at 86 persons per km^{2}. Barangay Purisima is the most densely populated with 1,137 persons per km^{2}, higher than the municipal density. Barangay Umbay has the lowest population density with 16 persons per km^{2}.

== Economy ==
Poverty incidence of Tago (%)

Source: Philippine Statistics Authority

== Tourism ==
- Tago River
- Tago-La Paz Bridge
- Cagpangi Falls
- Green Falls

== Education ==
Fifty-seven per cent (57%) of Tagon-ons are elementary graduates, 25% are high school graduates. Eighty-five per cent (85%) of them obtain college education but barely half of them hold academic degrees.
