= Immigration to the Philippines =

Immigration process

Immigration to the Philippines is the process by which people migrate to the Philippines to reside in the country. Many, but not all, become citizens of the Philippines.

== History ==
=== Prehistorical migration ===
Modern theories of the peopling of the Philippines are interpreted against the wider backdrop of the migrations of the Austronesian peoples. They comprise two major schools of thought, the "Out of Sundaland" models and the "Out of Taiwan" model. Of the two, however, the most widely accepted hypothesis is the Out-of-Taiwan model, which largely corresponds to linguistic, genetic, archaeological, and cultural evidence. It has since been strengthened by genetic and archaeological studies that broadly agree with the timeline of the Austronesian expansion.

=== Migration during the Spanish period ===
By the 16th century, Spanish colonization brought new groups of people to the Philippines mainly Spaniards and Mexicans. Many settled in the Philippines, and intermarried with the indigenous population. This gave rise to the Filipino mestizo or individuals of mixed Austronesian and Hispanic descent. There was migration of a military nature from Latin-America (Mexico and Peru) to the Philippines, composed of varying races (Amerindian, Mestizo and Criollo) as described by Stephanie J. Mawson in her book "Convicts or Conquistadores? Spanish Soldiers in the Seventeenth-Century Pacific". Also, in her dissertation paper called, "Between Loyalty and Disobedience: The Limits of Spanish Domination in the Seventeenth Century Pacific", she recorded an accumulated number of 15,600 soldier-settlers sent to the Philippines from Latin-America during the 1600s. In which timeframe, the total population of the Philippines was only about 667,612. Old Spanish censuses state that as much as 33.5% or one third of the population of the main island of Luzon had full or partial Hispanic or Latino (Mestizo, Mulatto and Native-American) descent.

The current modern-day Chinese Filipinos are mostly the descendants of immigrants from Southern Fujian in China from the 20th century and late 19th century, possibly numbering around 2 million, although there are an estimated 27 percent of Filipinos who have partial Chinese ancestry, stemming from precolonial and colonial Chinese (Sangley) migrants from the past centuries especially during the Spanish colonial era. Intermarriage between the groups is evident in the major cities and urban areas, and spans back to Spanish colonial times, where a colonial middle-class group known as the Mestizo de Sangley (Chinese mestizos) descend from. Its descendants during the late 19th century produced a major part of the ilustrado intelligentsia of the late Spanish Colonial Philippines, that were very influential with the creation of Filipino nationalism and the sparking of the Philippine Revolution.

There are also Japanese people, which include escaped Christians (Kirishitan) who fled the persecutions of Shogun Tokugawa Ieyasu which the Spanish empire in the Philippines had offered asylum from to form part of the Japanese settlement in the Philippines. In the 16th and 17th centuries, thousands of Japanese people traders also migrated to the Philippines and assimilated into the local population.

=== Migration during the American period ===
Following the escape from forced labor in the Spanish galleon trade in the 18th century, Filipino Americans would go to establish their own settlements. Filipino Americans founded their first recorded settlement in Saint Malo, Louisiana. Overtime, other settlements would come to fruition with the largest of them being Manila Village in Barataria Bay. The Philippines was a former American colony and during the American colonial era, there were over 800,000 Americans who were born in the Philippines but no clear data as it is still an estimation or it below to 100,000 or lower. As of 2013, there were 220,000 American citizens living in the country.

== Population ==
The total number of immigrants and expats in the Philippines as of the 2020 census is 78,396. This is significantly lower compared to 177,365 recorded in 2010.

According to a 2013 country migration report, the recent most notable nationalities of foreign aliens with work permits include Koreans, Chinese, Japanese, Americans, and British (either British citizen or British National (Overseas) – from British Hong Kong). Most of these foreign aliens with work permits are based in the National Capital Region (Metro Manila), followed by Calabarzon (Southern Tagalog), and Central Visayas, representing the more developed regions of the country. Most of them are employed in the manufacturing sector, although they tend to be involved in other sectors as well. The majority work in administrative, executive and managerial positions. The top three nationalities of registered aliens are Chinese (59,000), Koreans (39,000), and Americans (26,000).

The top ten countries of foreign citizenship in the Philippines according to the 2020 Census of Population and Housing are:

- China 22,494
- India 18,959
- United States 6,306
- Japan 4,397
- South Korea 4,372
- Germany 1,533
- Australia 1,460
- Taiwan 1,021
- Indonesia 955
- Vietnam 944
- Others 15,955

== Laws ==
The Philippine Immigration Act prescribes fourteen different visas grouped into two broad categories:

- Section 9 visas (non-immigrant visas), for temporary visits such as those for tourism, business, transit, study, or employment
- Section 13 visas (immigrant visas), for foreign nationals who wish to become permanent residents in the Philippines

Some visas have been introduced by subsequent legislation or proclamation of the President which are not classified by the Philippine Immigration Act as either being a Section 9 or Section 13 visa. These visas are called special visas and are issued to groups such as retirees, investors, and entrepreneurs.

The Bureau of Immigration was given the sole authority to enforce and administer immigration and foreign nationals registration laws including the admission, registration, exclusion and deportation and repatriation of foreign nationals. It also supervises the immigration from the Philippines of foreign nationals.

== Refugees ==
The Philippines has a history of accepting refugees fleeing from conflict, persecution and calamities. This instances include:

- White Russians from the former Russian Empire following the 1917 October Revolution
- Jewish people from Nazi Germany and German-occupied Europe
- Spanish republicans following the end of the Spanish Civil War in 1939
- Chinese refugees following the end of the Chinese Civil War
- White Russians from China
- Vietnamese boat people fleeing the Vietnam War
- Iranian students and workers in the Philippines following the Iranian Revolution
- Lao, Cambodian, and Vietnamese refugees in the 1980s
- East Timorese refugees during the Indonesian occupation of East Timor

== See also ==
- Americans in the Philippines
- Arabs in the Philippines
- Brazilians in the Philippines
- Chinese Filipino
- Filipinos of Malay descent
- Germans in the Philippines
- Greek settlement in the Philippines
- History of the Jews in the Philippines
- Indian Filipino
- Indonesians in the Philippines
- Iranians in the Philippines
- Japanese in the Philippines
- Koreans in the Philippines
- Mexican settlement in the Philippines
- Nepalese people in the Philippines
- Polish settlement in the Philippines
- Spanish Filipino
- Overseas Filipinos
- Tourism in the Philippines
