= Asian Brazilians =

Brazilians of Asian birth or descent

Brasileiros orientais (Portuguese)

Total population
- East Asian ancestry predominates ▼850,130 (2022 census) ▼0.42% of Brazilian population (Note: The exact number of Asian descendants remains unknown. Brazil's census does not officially use the term "Asian" as a racial category, instead using the term amarela (yellow) in reference to ethnic East Asians. Older estimates for other Asian communities in Brazil, particularly the Lebanese-Brazilian community, make up an estimated 7 million people.)

Regions with significant populations
- Mainly in São Paulo, Paraná and Pará

Languages
- Portuguese; Other languages of Asia, including Arabic, Chinese dialects, Korean, and Japanese

Religion
- Majority Christian: 61.2% Roman Catholicism, 13.3% Protestantism, 12.5% Non-religious, 0.8% other Christian beliefs Minority: Buddhism, Judaism, Shinto and Shinto-derived Japanese new religions, Taoism, Hinduism, Islam, Sikhism, Jainism, Zoroastrianism and Druze

Asian Brazilians (Portuguese: Brasileiros asiáticos) refers to Brazilian citizens or residents of Asian ancestry. The vast majority trace their origins to Western Asia, particularly Lebanon, or East Asia, namely Japan. The Brazilian census does not use "Asian" as a racial category, though the term "yellow" (amarela in Portuguese) refers to people of East Asian ethnic origin.

Beyond the descendants from West Asia and East Asia, there has also been much smaller immigration from Southeast Asia and South Asia, as well as those from the Asian diaspora in the Caribbean and Mozambique.

Brazil has the largest community of Japanese descendants outside of Japan. Japanese immigrants started to move to Brazil in 1908, and were directed to the Brazilian coffee plantations.

== History ==
Recent research has suggested that Asians from the early Portuguese Eastern Empire, known as Luso-Asians first came to Brazil during the sixteenth century as seamen known as Lascars, or as servants, slaves and concubines accompanying the governors, merchants and clergy who has served in Portuguese Asia.

The first substantial Asian immigration to Brazil were a small number of Chinese people (3,000) during the colonial period as coolie slaves. Later waves of Chinese immigrants would come from Hong Kong and Macau, the latter being a former Portuguese colony, as well as China's ethnic Russian community during the 1950s.

East Asian Brazilians 1940-2022
Year	Population	% of Brazil
1940	242,320	0.59%
1950	329,082	▲0.63%
1960	482,848	▲0.69%
1980	672,251	▼0.56%
1991	630,656	▼0.43%
2000	761,583	▲0.45%
2010	2,084,288	▲1.09%
2022	850,130	▼0.42%
Source: Brazilian census

Later, significant immigration from Asia to Brazil would start in the late 19th century, when immigration from Lebanon and Syria became important. Until 1922, Levantine immigrants were considered "Turks", as they carried passports issued by the Turkish Ottoman Empire, which then ruled over present-day Lebanon. Various estimates for Lebanese ancestry in Brazil place them at about 7 million.

Another important Asian immigrant group to Brazil were from Japan. The first Japanese immigrants arrived in Brazil in 1908. Until the 1950s, more than 250 thousand Japanese immigrated to Brazil. Currently, the Japanese-Brazilian population is estimated at 2.1 million people. It is the largest ethnic Japanese population outside Japan, followed closely by the Japanese community in the United States.

Other East Asian groups are also significant in Brazil. The Korean Brazilian population is estimated to be 70,000, and the Chinese Brazilian population around 250,000. Over 70% of Asian Brazilians are concentrated in the state of São Paulo. There are significant populations in Paraná, Pará, Mato Grosso do Sul, and other parts of Brazil.

=== Japanese in Brazil ===
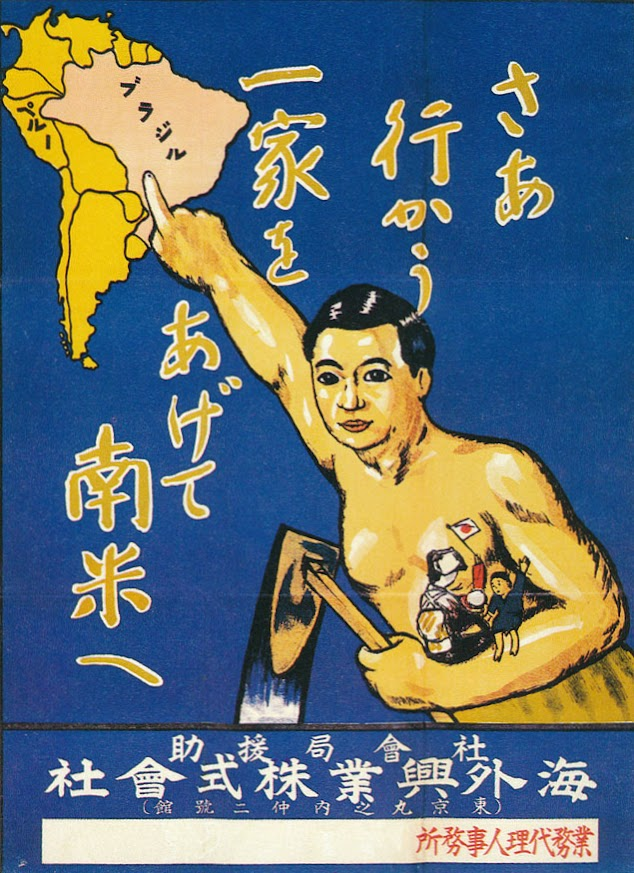
A poster used in Japan to attract immigrants to Brazil

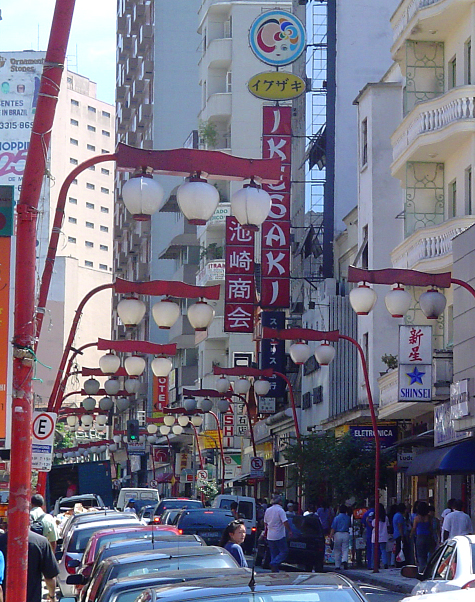
Liberdade village in São Paulo

Japanese immigration to Brazil Source: (IBGE)
Ethnic group	Period					
Ethnic group	1904-1913	1914-1923	1924-1933	1945-1949	1950-1954	1955-1959
Japanese	11,868	20,398	110,191	12	5,447	28,819

=== Restrictions on Asian immigrants ===
Although discussions were situated in a theoretical field, immigrants arrived and colonies were founded through all this period (the rule of Pedro II), especially from 1850 on, particularly in the Southeast and Southern Brazil. These discussions culminated in the Decree 528 in 1890, signed by Brazil's first President Deodoro da Fonseca, which opened the national harbors to immigration except for Africans and Asians. This decree remained valid until 5 October 1892 when, due to pressures of coffee planters interested in cheap manpower, it was overturned by Law 97, which allowed the entry of Japanese immigrants to work on the coffee plantations, as until then, Brazilian immigration was almost exclusively from Europe.

== See also ==
- East Asian people
- Asian Latin Americans
- Chinese Brazilians
- Filipino immigration to Brazil
- Indian immigration to Brazil
- Japanese Brazilians
- Korean Brazilians
