= Tourism in the Philippines =

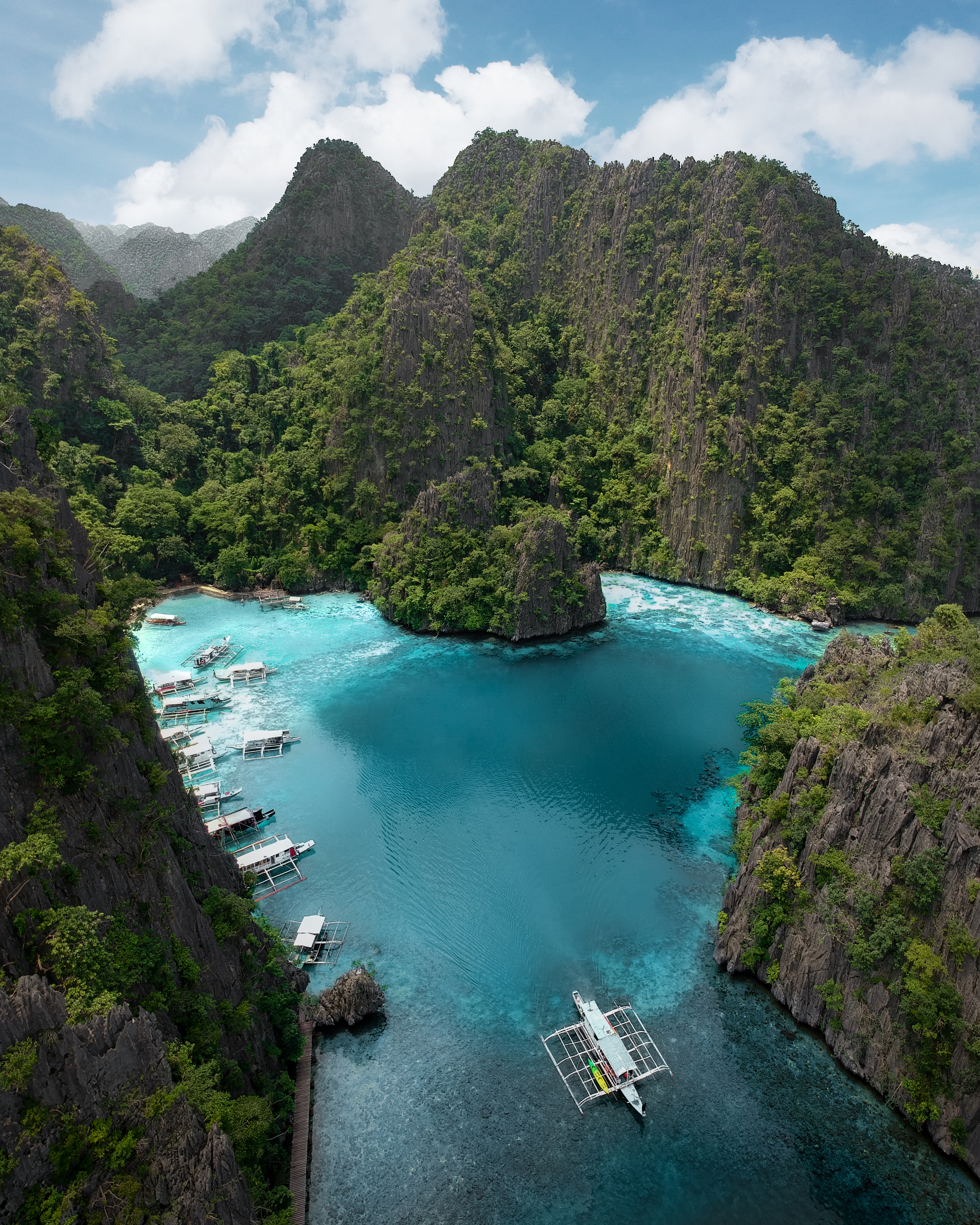
Palawan, which includes Coron, is a UNESCO Biosphere Reserve.

Tourism is an important sector for the Philippine economy. The travel and tourism industry contributed 8.1% to the country's GDP in 2025; this was lower than the 12.7% recorded in 2019 prior to the COVID-19 lockdowns. Coastal tourism, encompassing beach and diving activities, constitutes 25% of the Philippines' tourism revenue, serving as its primary income source in the sector. Popular destinations among tourists include Boracay, Palawan, Cebu and Siargao. While the Philippines has encountered political and social challenges that have affected its tourism industry, the country has also taken steps to address these issues. Over the past years, there have been efforts to improve political stability, enhance security measures, and promote social inclusivity, all of which contribute to creating a more favorable environment for tourism, such as the Boracay rehabilitation.

As of 2025, 7.70 million Filipinos were employed in the tourism industry, it generated ₱2.27 trillion (US$44.1 billion) in revenue from foreign tourists, coming mostly from South Korea, the United States and Japan. The country attracted a total of 5,360,682 foreign visitors in 2015 through its tourism campaign of It's More Fun in the Philippines! In 2019, foreign arrivals peaked at 8,260,913.

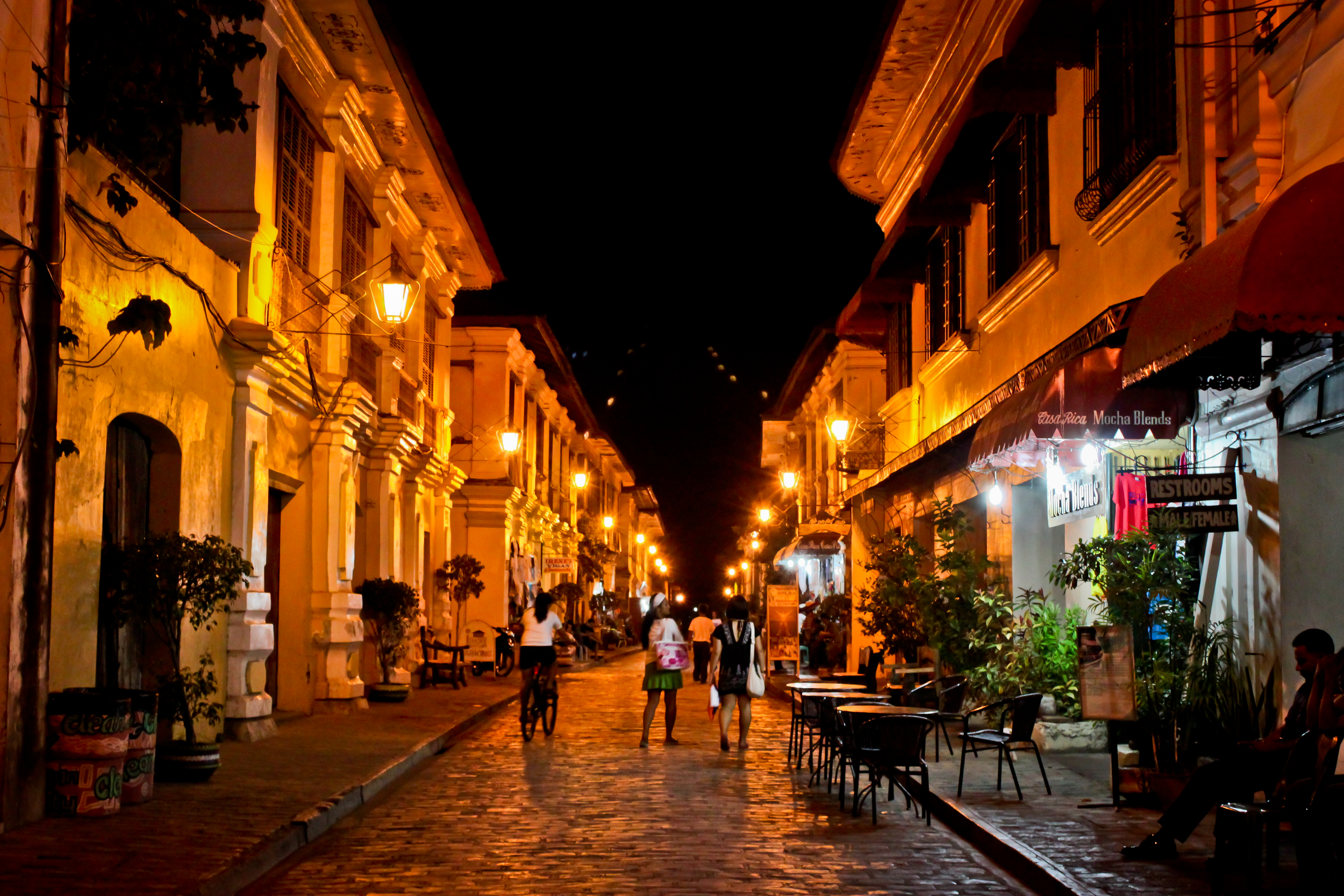
Vigan, a World Heritage Site

The country is also home to one of the New 7 Wonders of Nature, the Puerto Princesa Subterranean River National Park, and one of the New 7 Wonders Cities, the Heritage City of Vigan. It is also home to six UNESCO World Heritage Sites scattered in nine different locations, three UNESCO biosphere reserves, three UNESCO intangible cultural heritage, four UNESCO memory of the world documentary heritage, three UNESCO creative cities, two UNESCO World Heritage cities, seven Ramsar wetland sites, and 14 ASEAN Heritage Parks.

== Overview ==
Tourism Slogan of the Philippines

In 2011, the administration of President Noynoy Aquino through his Department of Tourism (DOT) recorded 3.9 million tourists visiting the country, 11.2% higher than the 3.5 million registered in 2010. Tourist arrivals jumped to 4.27 million in 2012, after the Aquino government launched a widely publicized tourism marketing campaign entitled "It's More Fun In the Philippines", which became an international success.

The 2017 Travel and Tourism Competitiveness Report of the World Economic Forum ranked the Philippines 79th out of 136 countries overall. The country's best-rated features were price competitiveness (22nd) and natural resources (37th).

The tourism industry employed 3.8 million Filipinos, or 10.2% of the nation's employment, in 2011.

The official heritage properties of the Philippines are listed under the National Government's Philippine Registry of Cultural Property (PRECUP), Pinagmulan: Enumeration from the Philippine Inventory of Intangible Cultural Heritage, and the National Integrated Protected Areas System (NIPAS). Properties registered among those lists are heralded as possible nominations to the UNESCO World Heritage List, where at least 16 declarations containing 19 properties have been recognized by UNESCO through its four different lists (UNESCO World Heritage List, UNESCO Memory of the World Register, UNESCO Intangible Cultural Heritage List, and UNESCO Biosphere Reserve Registry).

== History ==
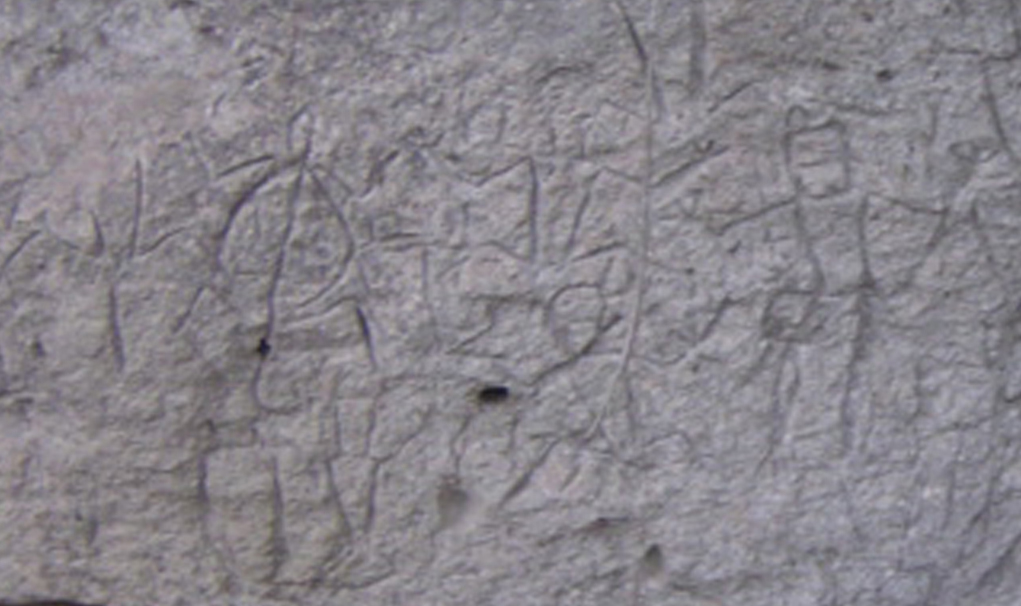
Some of the carvings in the Angono Petroglyphs, the oldest rock art in the Philippines and UNESCO Tentative Site

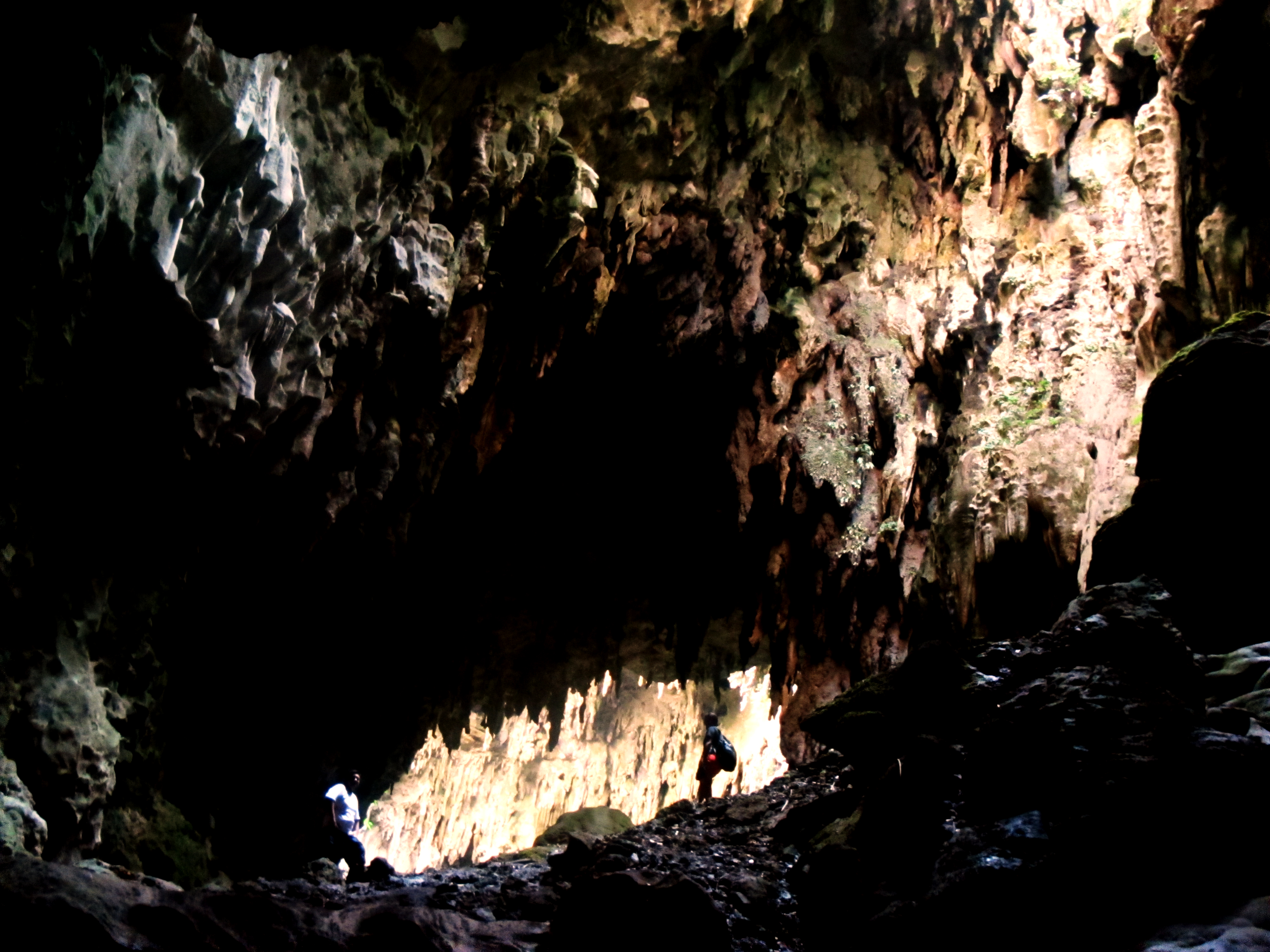
Callao Cave, a Paleolithic site in the Cagayan Valley where the 67,000-year old Callao Man was found and a UNESCO Tentative Site

Tourism in the Philippines traces its origins during the ancient times when the first set of people chose to migrate through land bridges, followed by the other sets of migrations from the Malayan archipelago in the south and Taiwan in the north. Trade also became part of the tourism as Arabs, Indians, Japanese, Chinese, Malays, and other ethnic groups in mainland Southeast Asia, Taiwan, and Ryukyu traded goods with the natives. When the islands became part of the territory of Spain, an influx of Spanish people migrated into the country, though still few compared to the Spanish migrations in South America as the Philippines was farther from Spain. In contrast, there were more Latin Americans who immigrated to the Philippines than Spaniards since the Philippines was closer to Latin-America than Spain was. Despite the utterly unique status of the Philippines as the only country in Asia which was settled by Latin Americans, and hosts the only Latin American established districts in Asia as well as the only former Anglo American colony in Asia, with other Asians being settled by Europeans instead, this unique status is ignored and tourism in the Philippines is non-existent compared to their less unique Asian neighbors.

The tourism industry flourished during the late 19th to early 20th centuries due to the influx of immigrants from Europe and the United States. It was listed as one of the best countries to visit in Asia aside from Hong Kong and Japan, earning the nickname "Pearl of the Orient Seas". The tourism declined during and after World War II, leaving the country with a completely devastated economy, and a landscape filled with destroyed heritage towns. The second wave of tourist influx flourished in the 1950s but declined drastically during the dictatorship era. After the People Power Revolution, the tourism industry continued to decline due to the domino effect caused by the Marcos dictatorship. The industry only managed to cope in 1991 and 1992, when 1.2 million tourists visited the Philippines. It afterwards waned again after a decade due to corrupt practices in government.

In 2012, the Department of Tourism launched the "It's More Fun in the Philippines!" campaign, intended to compete with more established regional tourism slogans such as "Amazing Thailand", "Malaysia Truly Asia" and "Incredible India". Foreign arrivals rose each year over the campaign's first four years, increasing by 25.46% from 4,272,811 in 2012 to 5,360,682 in 2015; South Korea, the United States and Japan were the top source countries throughout the period.

A total of 8,260,913 international visitors arrived from January to December 2019, up by 15.24% for the same period in 2018. 58.62% (4,842,774) of these came from East Asia, 15.84% (1,308,444) came from North America, and 6.38% (526,832) came from other ASEAN countries.

The tourism industry was severely affected during the COVID-19 pandemic, when tourist arrivals dropped to only 1.48 million in 2020 due to government pandemic-related lockdowns to control the spread of the virus, and when Super Typhoon Odette ravaged tourism-dependent remote islands, including Siargao, in central and southern Philippines in December 2021. The country was reopened to international tourists starting February 10, 2022, after nearly two years of border closure due to the COVID-19 pandemic.

=== Government initiatives since 2018 ===
Under the National Tourism Development Plan (NTDP), the Duterte administration set aside $23 billion to develop tourist infrastructure that was "not only sustainable and highly competitive in the region, but also socially responsible to propel inclusive growth". In 2018, the Department of Tourism recorded 7.1 million foreign tourists to the Philippines that year, despite the closure of popular destination Boracay for cleanup. A total of 8.26 million international tourists visited the country throughout 2019, breaking the department's record and exceeding the NTDP target.

In January 2021, the Department of Public Works and Highways reported ₱120 billion was allocated from 2016 to 2021 for the construction and improvement of 4,147 km (2,577 mi) of roads leading to tourist destinations, of which 2,168 km (1,347 mi) were completed. Following a decline in tourism due to a COVID-19 border closure of two years, the administration reopened the Philippines to international tourists and stopped requiring RT-PCR tests of fully vaccinated passengers upon arrival.

== Statistics ==
Yearly tourist arrivals in millions

=== Country visitor statistics ===
Country	Aug 2026	2025	2024	2023	2022	2021	2020	2019	2018	2017	2016	2015	2014	2013	2012	2011	2010
United States	926,575	1,323,142	1,239,674	1,107,787	505,089	49,117	235,440	1,108,862	1,068,161	1,007,081	937,384	852,010	794,539	745,180	730,036	703,534	694,780
South Korea	744,732	1,346,301	1,651,779	1,470,259	428,014	6,575	339,702	1,989,661	1,625,829	1,609,884	1,475,292	1,339,936	1,175,717	1,165,881	1,031,178	925,225	740,629
Japan	321,545	502,546	444,258	310,790	99,557	15,362	140,872	684,303	637,666	609,456	571,266	537,697	504,378	472,116	449,802	408,225	388,872
China	303,567	267,660	313,856	263,836	39,627	9,817	170,994	1,743,605	1,258,832	968,897	675,676	490,856	394,967	426,369	250,904	243,155	187,453
Canada	237,989	333,136	283,080	261,710	121,413	8,348	60,697	246,480	236,337	219,229	199,583	182,922	169,807	155,984	145,819	135,262	123,521
Australia	237,849	359,646	317,003	287,392	137,974	2,429	57,952	291,616	284,523	265,635	259,942	250,845	234,188	221,837	199,071	177,749	153,974
Taiwan	153,700	213,928	213,833	194,851	23,604	1,749	50,493	327,454	242,633	236,846	229,306	177,677	142,981	139,108	216,528	181,738	142,460
United Kingdom	151,574	229,941	211,414	187,784	101,052	4,625	41,254	212,080	203,493	189,140	182,717	165,189	144,102	133,159	125,472	116,532	111,059
India	82,692	104,994	79,366	70,286	51,542	7,207	29,141	134,996	121,153	107,288	90,820	74,824	61,153	52,206	46,398	42,849	34,582
Singapore*	74,704	115,341	115,906	104,346	53,448	774	23,059	159,141	172,538	169,051	176,181	181,313	179,175	175,147	148,305	137,846	121,113
Malaysia*	73,754	104,989	102,502	102,774	46,805	1,627	24,645	139,982	145,390	143,566	139,143	155,830	139,258	109,458	114,525	91,757	79,699
France	72,279	78,823	67,082	51,601	23,949	1,425	24,530	88,577	74,400	64,777	55,384	45,505	48,644	38,946	39,042	33,709	31,359
Germany	70,750	108,569	100,322	85,233	39,013	2,152	26,261	104,410	93,257	87,434	89,259	78,448	75,883	73,955	70,488	64,480	62,347
Spain	39,400	65,828	61,691	44,901	19,194	1,273	9,995	50,206	44,662	39,325	35,409	27,830	22,983	20,832	20,354	18,722	17,243
Italy	37,944	56,119	45,571	34,157	12,933	1,357	9,961	39,498	36,825	44,755	45,904	44,910	42,603	40,278	44,038	44,043	47,577
Indonesia*	37,886	49,903	57,864	53,707	24,596	1,934	14,568	70,892	76,734	62,945	45,904	48,181	46,759	45,585	36,631	34,544	31,997
Russia	33,664	44,007	37,341	29,779	8,040	1,036	12,683	36,125	29,974	33,285	28,215	25,285	32,092	35,415	28,280	20,190	14,645
Netherlands	32,971	49,646	44,379	37,622	19,306	1,554	9,164	41,510	37,322	34,216	32,336	29,096	25,761	23,108	22,709	21,521	19,875
New Zealand	32,398	50,603	45,030	41,814	17,503	392	7,508	38,847	34,319	31,198	26,473	24,016	21,056	18,774	17,270	15,355	13,674
Vietnam*	31,605	33,599	51,396	59,354	38,605	1,811	12,013	66,713	52,364	39,959	33,899	31,584	29,803	26,602	20,818	17,782	17,311
Thailand*	25,881	49,650	47,675	40,952	16,300	1,501	10,955	61,343	59,873	48,752	47,928	44,056	45,960	47,893	40,997	37,877	36,718
Israel	22,029	28,399	18,929	15,139	9,711	460	4,860	22,875	20,362	17,458	16,728	11,760	8,779	7,676	5,899	4,990	4,527
Switzerland	19,767	31,769	30,813	24,048	11,092	628	7,266	30,207	31,518	30,775	30,881	28,784	27,031	26,441	25,295	24,033	23,177
Poland	17,260	28,388	21,159	13,829	4,222	528	5,445	15,828	12,607	10,836	8,933	8,082	5,954	5,669	4,206	3,267	2,926
Hong Kong SAR	14,074	96,679	98,073	80,512	8,589	354	12,444	91,653	117,992	111,135	116,328	122,180	114,100	126,008	118,666	112,106	133,746
Myanmar*	6,863	5,577	11,035	6,873	4,255	274	2,909	13,980	9,364	9,573	7,442	7,033	6,633	4,948	4,291	3,246	3,983
Cambodia*	3,204	4,268	3,999	3,665	1,454	59	1,010	5,992	4,712	4,715	3,527	3,503	3,278	3,230	2,662	2,469	2,244
Brunei*	3,123	5,853	6,578	6,639	1,884	66	1,389	8,160	9,564	8,965	8,213	9,015	9,678	8,299	5,994	5,248	4,072
United Arab Emirates	1,814	3,320	3,471	3,288	2,084	3,889	12,667	10,473	15,772	16,520	17,640	16,888	17,007	15,169	12,695	13,413	12,742
Total	4,415,860	6,484,060	6,435,438	5,663,166	2,653,858	163,879	1,482,535	8,260,913	7,168,467	6,620,908	5,967,005	5,360,682	4,833,368	4,681,307	4,272,811	3,917,454	3,520,471

* Country in ASEAN

=== Annual statistics (Foreign arrivals) ===
Year	Arrivals	Change
1996	1,049,367	
1997	1,222,523	▲16.5%
1998	1,149,357	▼5.9%
1999	1,170,514	▲1.8%
2000	1,992,169	▲70.1%
2001	1,796,893	▼9.8%
2002	1,932,677	▲7.5%
2003	1,907,226	▼1.3%
2004	2,291,352	▲20.1%
2005	2,623,084	▲14.4%
2006	2,843,335	▲8.3%
2007	3,091,993	▲8.7%
2008	3,139,422	▲1.5%
2009	3,017,099	▼3.8%
2010	3,520,471	▲16.6%
2011	3,917,454	▲11.2%
2012	4,272,811	▲9.0%
2013	4,681,307	▲9.5%
2014	4,833,368	▲3.2%
2015	5,360,682	▲10.9%
2016	5,967,005	▲11.3%
2017	6,620,908	▲10.9%
2018	7,168,467	▲8.2%
2019	8,260,913	▲15.2%
2020	1,482,535	▼82.0%
2021	163,879	▼88.9%
2022	2,653,858	▲1519.4%
2023	5,663,166	▲113.4%
2024	6,435,438	▲13.6%
2025	6,484,060	▲0.8%
Jan-Aug 2026	4,415,860	

=== Regional distribution of overnight travelers (2024) ===
Top 26 by Foreign Overnight Travelers (source: tourism.gov.ph)
	City / Municipality / Island	Province	Region	Foreign	OFW	Domestic	Total
1	Lapu-Lapu City	Cebu	Central Visayas	811,001	106	518,612	1,329,719
2	Clark Freeport and Special Economic Zone	Pampanga	Central Luzon	769,273	-	625,247	1,394,520
3	Cebu City	Cebu	Central Visayas	524,514	616	1,332,413	1,857,543
4	Makati		Metro Manila	509,560	-	623,600	1,133,160
5	Boracay (Malay)	Aklan	Western Visayas	412,803	24,096	1,641,078	2,077,977
6	Panglao	Bohol	Central Visayas	405,603	2,412	449,499	857,514
7	El Nido	Palawan	Mimaropa	366,763	-	224,843	591,606
8	Quezon City		Metro Manila	221,753	-	1,040,346	1,262,099
9	Coron	Palawan	Mimaropa	220,149	-	129,431	349,580
10	Puerto Princesa	Palawan	Mimaropa	205,060	-	562,163	767,223
11	Manila		Metro Manila	191,232	-	425,937	617,169
12	Pasig		Metro Manila	165,652	-	741,720	907,372
13	Cordova	Cebu	Central Visayas	144,171	1,333	27,988	173,492
14	Mandaue	Cebu	Central Visayas	140,652	-	352,121	492,773
15	Pasay		Metro Manila	137,413	-	272,390	409,803
16	Muntinlupa		Metro Manila	126,685	-	263,363	390,048
17	Parañaque		Metro Manila	115,307	-	156,925	272,232
18	Siargao	Surigao del Norte	Caraga	101,719	-	455,375	557,094
19	Moalboal	Cebu	Central Visayas	86,336	5	106,709	193,050
20	Puerto Galera	Oriental Mindoro	Mimaropa	82,222	142	161,674	244,038
21	Davao City	Davao del Sur	Davao Region	81,498	26,470	1,694,711	1,802,679
22	Daanbantayan	Cebu	Central Visayas	81,061	-	101,717	182,778
23	San Juan	Siquijor	Central Visayas	71,277	64	113,971	185,312
24	San Vicente	Palawan	Mimaropa	69,840	-	20,989	90,829
25	Angeles City	Pampanga	Central Luzon	67,734	-	107,554	175,288
26	Bacolod	Negros Occidental	Negros Island Region	59,261	59	774,025	833,345

== Attractions ==
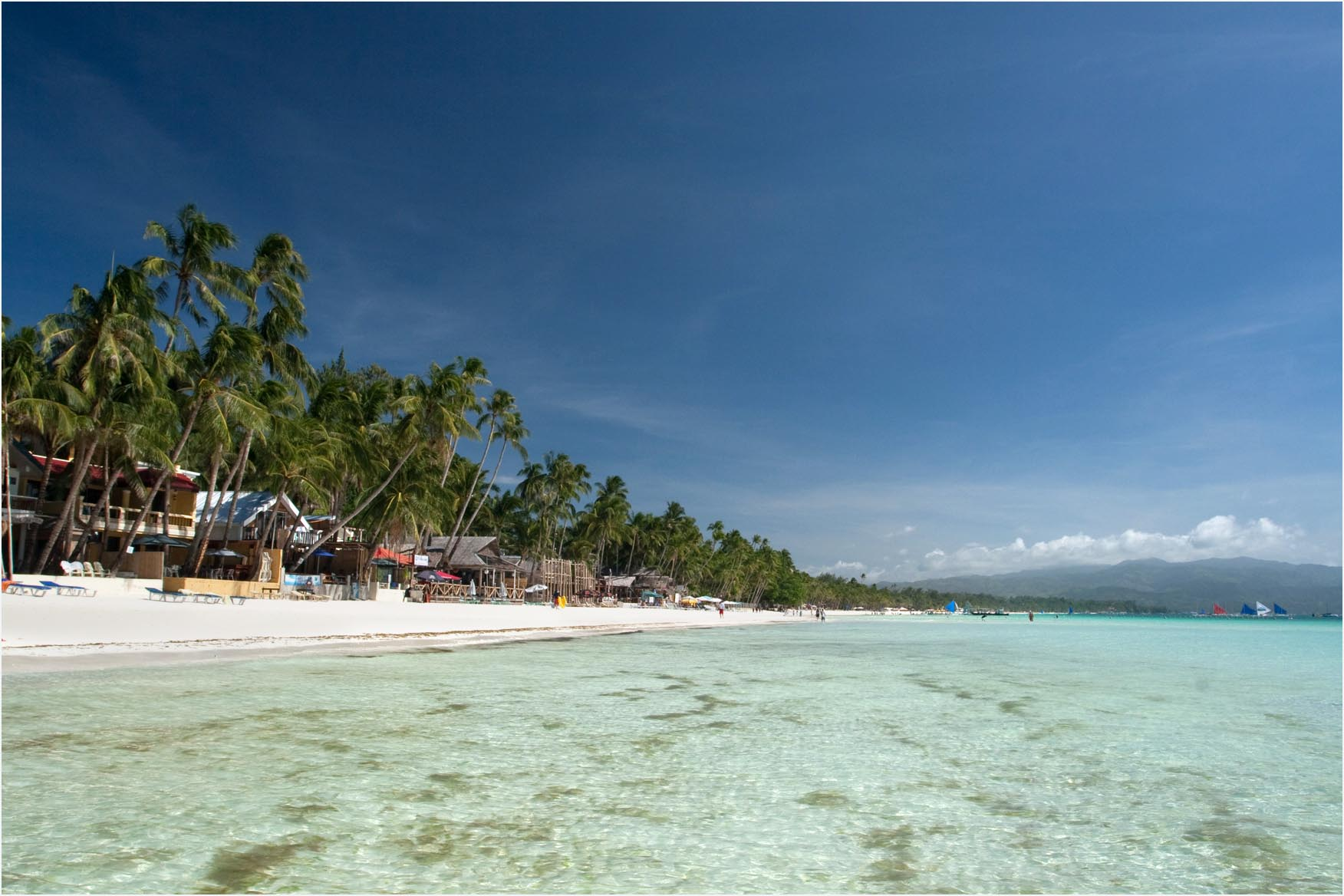
Boracay Island in Aklan

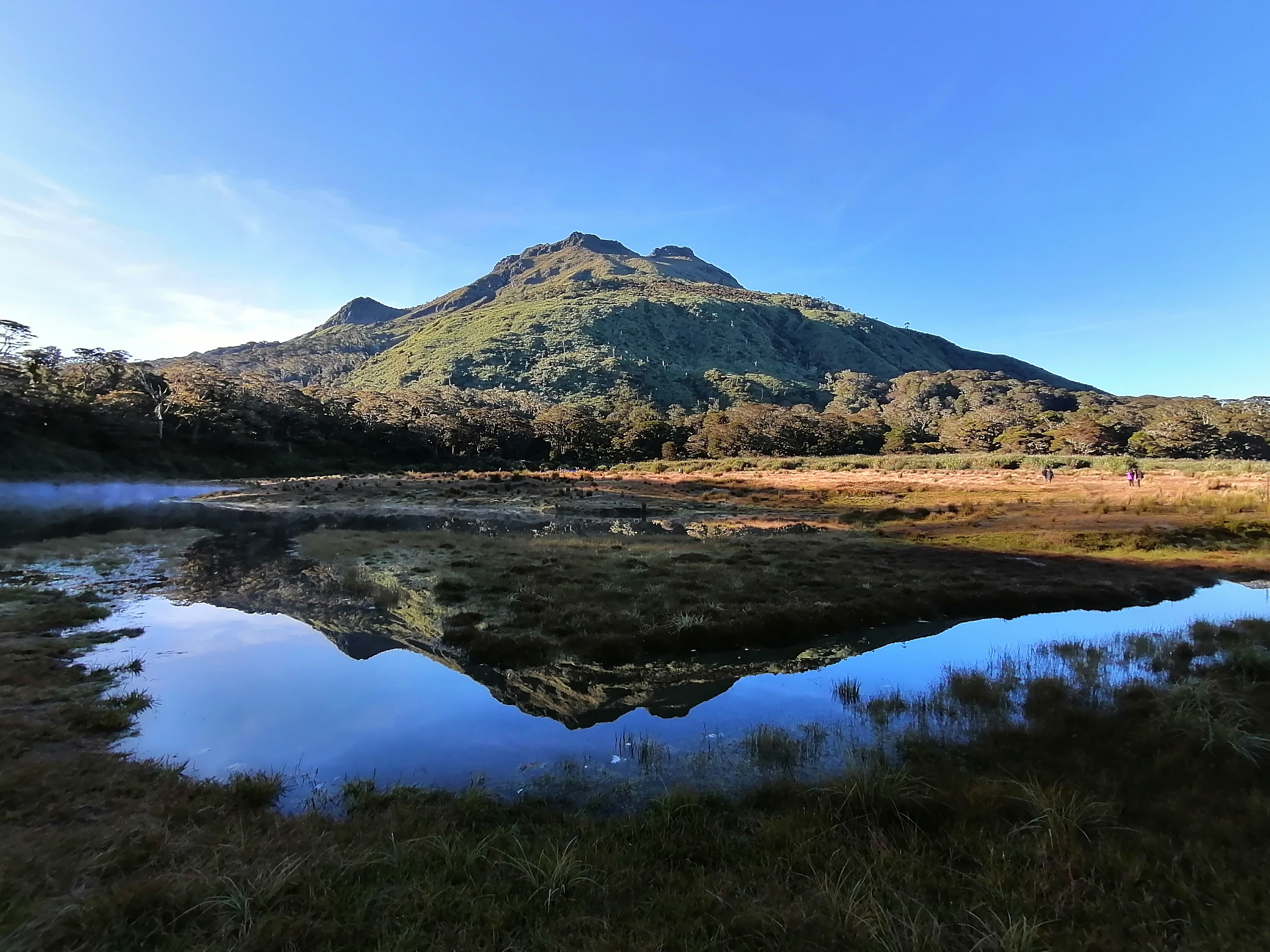
Summit of Mount Apo, the highest mountain in the Philippines

The island of Luzon is considered the political and economic center of the Philippines. The economy of Luzon is centered in Metro Manila, the national capital region. Manila was ranked 11th most attractive city for American shoppers out of 25 Asia Pacific cities by a Global Blue survey in 2012. Shopping malls can be found around the metropolis, especially in the business and financial districts of Makati, Ortigas and Bonifacio Global City.

The most popular destinations in the Visayas are Bohol and Boracay known for their white sand beaches and have been favorite island destinations for local and foreign visitors. In 2012, Boracay received the "best island" award from the international travel magazine Travel + Leisure. Boracay is also a popular destination for relaxation, tranquility and an exciting nightlife. In 2018, three Philippine islands, Siargao Island, Boracay, and Palawan, were listed on Condé Nast Traveler's list of Asia's best islands. The three islands were ranked first, second, and third, respectively.

Mindanao, the southernmost island of the Philippines, is home to the country's highest mountain, Mount Apo. The mountain has become a popular hiking destination for mountain climbers. On average, it takes two to three days to reach the summit. The mountain has a wide range of flora and fauna, including over 272 bird species, 111 of which are endemic to the area, including the national bird, the Philippine eagle.

=== Immovable Tangible Heritage ===
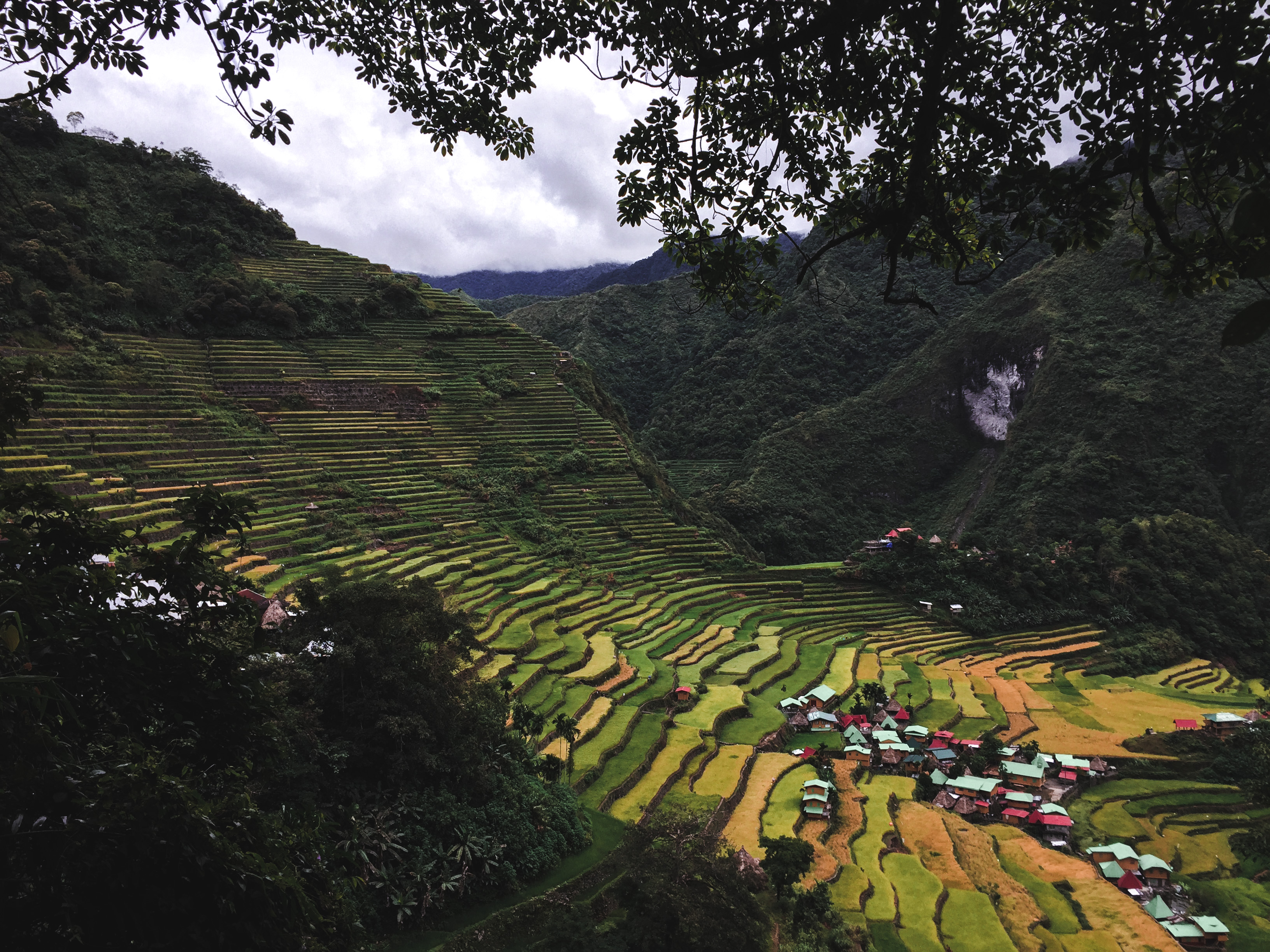
Batad Rice Terraces, part of the Rice Terraces of the Philippine Cordilleras, a World Heritage Site

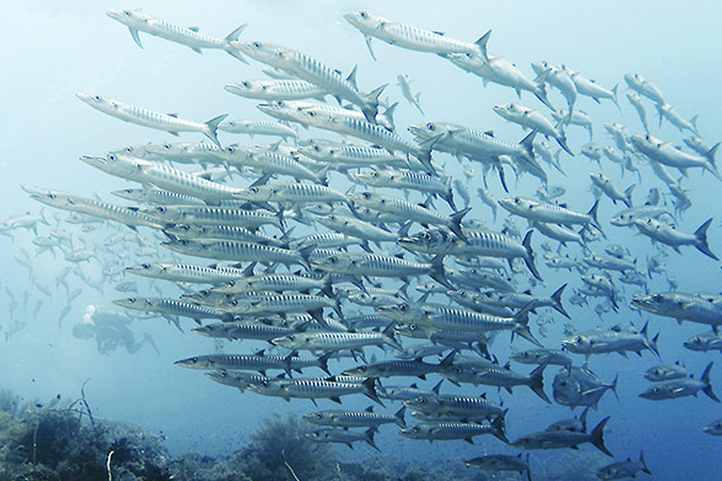
Tubbataha Reefs Natural Park, UNESCO World Heritage Site and Future Policy Awardee for marine resource management

The Philippines has six UNESCO World Heritage Sites scattered in nine different locations: Vigan, Baroque Churches of the Philippines (comprising Santa Maria Church, Paoay Church, San Agustin Church, Miagao Church), Rice Terraces of the Philippine Cordilleras which includes five different rice terrace clusters, Tubbataha Reefs Natural Park, Puerto Princesa Subterranean River National Park, and Mount Hamiguitan Wildlife Sanctuary.

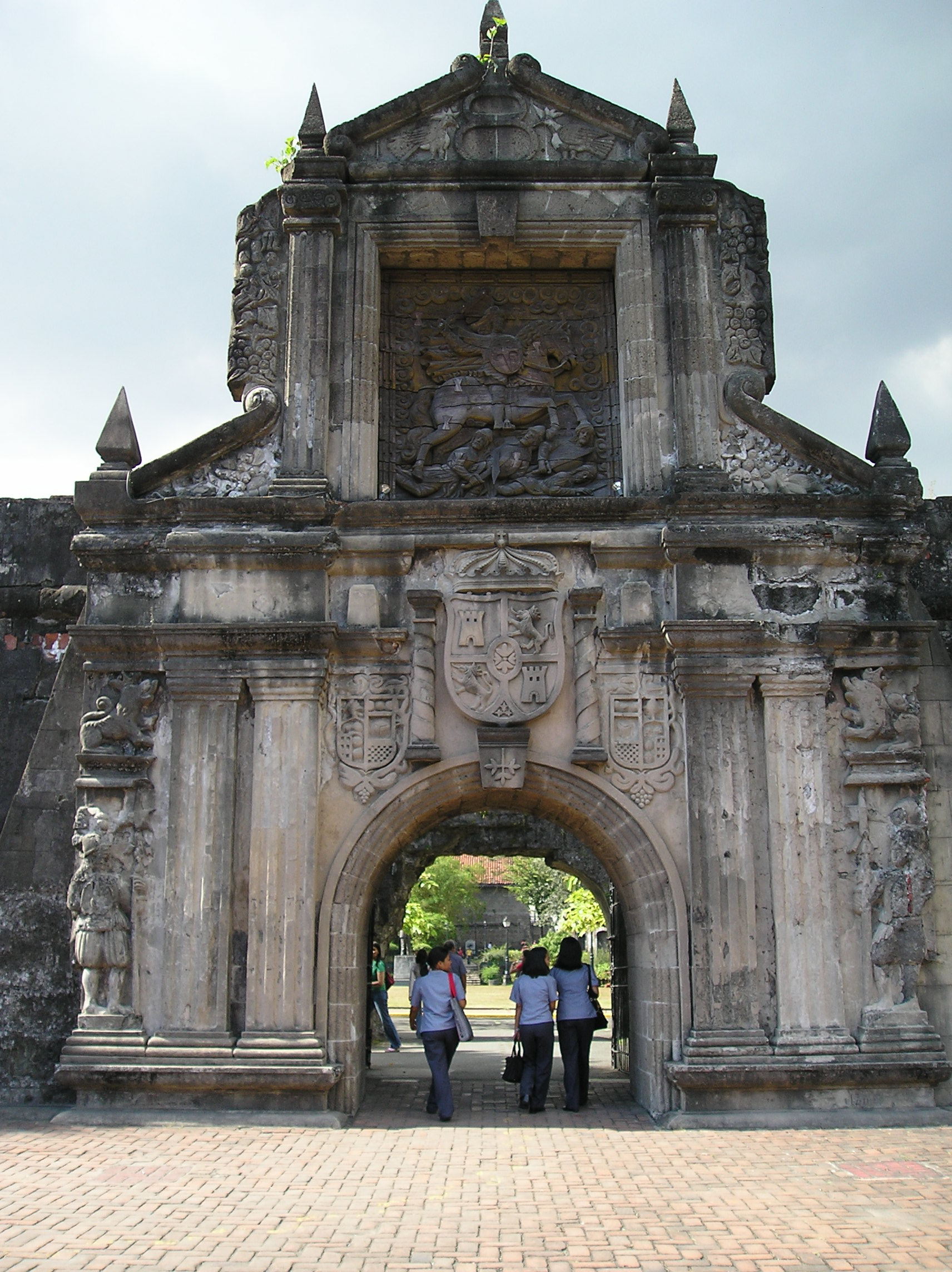
Fort Santiago arch

The country has one UNESCO World Heritage City, Vigan and three UNESCO Creative Cities, (Baguio, Cebu City, and Iloilo City). There are three UNESCO Biosphere Reserves (Palawan Biosphere Reserve, Albay Biosphere Reserve, and Puerto Galera Biosphere Reserve), and 14 ASEAN Heritage Parks: Agusan Marsh Wildlife Sanctuary, Apo Reef Natural Park, Balinsasayao Twin Lakes Natural Park, Mount Apo Natural Park, Mount Hamiguitan Range Wildlife Sanctuary, Mount Inayawan Range Natural Park, Mount Kitanglad Range Natural Park, Mount Makiling Forest Reserve, Mount Malindang Range Natural Park, Mounts Iglit–Baco National Park, Timpoong and Hibok-Hibok Natural Monument, Pasonanca Natural Park, Tubbataha Reefs Natural Park, and Turtle Islands Wildlife Sanctuary.

=== Movable Tangible Heritage ===
The Philippines possesses numerous significant movable tangible heritage, both in cultural and natural terms. Many are declared as national treasures and are highly protected by the law. The country has four documentary heritage inscribed in the UNESCO Memory of the World Register, namely, the José Maceda Collection, Philippine Paleographs (Hanunoo, Buhid, Tagbanua, and Pala’wan), Presidential Papers of Manuel L. Quezon, and Radio Broadcast of the Philippine People Power Revolution. Many of the cultural objects of the country are housed in government and private museums and libraries throughout the archipelago, such as the National Museum of the Philippines and the National Library of the Philippines. Aside from movable heritage under Philippine possession, there are also Philippine-originated artifacts and art pieces that have been looted or bought by foreigners and are now housed by other countries. Such pieces include the Golden Tara, the two existing copies of Doctrina Cristiana, the Boxer Codex, and many others.

=== Intangible Heritage ===
The country currently possesses at least three UNESCO intangible cultural heritage elements, one of which, the Hudhud Epic Chants of the Ifugao, was declared by UNESCO as one of the eleven great traditions of humanity. The other two elements inscribed by UNESCO are the Darangen Chant of the Maranao people of Lake Lanao and the Punnuk tug-of-war Game of the Ifugao. Education concerning Philippine mythology is also a notable intangible heritage of the country.

=== Filipino cuisine ===
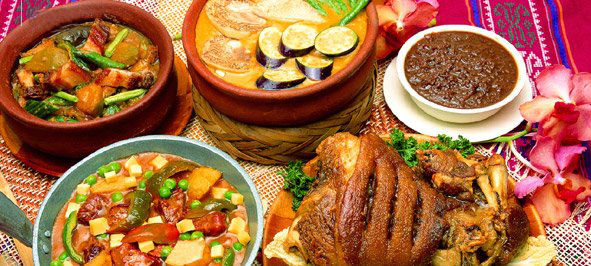
A selection of dishes found in Filipino cuisine

Filipino cuisine is the polymerization of 144 distinct cuisines in the Philippines, coming from separate ethno-linguistic groups. The style of cooking and the food associated with it have evolved over many centuries from their Austronesian origins (shared with Malaysian and Indonesian cuisines) to a mixed cuisine of Indian, Chinese, Spanish, and American influences, in line with the major waves of influence that had enriched the cultures of the archipelago, as well as others adapted to indigenous ingredients and the local palate. Well-known Filipino food include adobo, sinigang, kare-kare, pinakbet, lumpia, pancit, lechon, sisig, halo-halo, pandesal, puto, chicharrón, bibingka, dinengdeng, suman, and balut. Adobo and ube are the most internationally known.

=== Wildlife tourism in the Philippines ===
The Philippine archipelago remains a prime destination for ecotourism and wildlife tourism as the country ranks among the world's 17 mega-biodiverse countries. The country's approximately 7,000 islands contain a variety of habitats for local fauna and flora such as rainforests, mangrove forests, coral reefs. A multitude of threatened and endangered species of animals are endemic to the Philippines such as the Philippine eagle, Tamaraw, Philippine crocodile, and Philippine tarsier.

The Philippines is also a prime destination for observing and interacting with marine megafauna, most notably the whale sharks in Donsol, Sorsogon, and the thresher sharks near Malapascua, Cebu. Many other marine species are protected in famous destinations such as the Tubbataha Reefs Natural Park, Apo Reef National Park, and the Tañon Strait. A variety of destinations cater to wildlife tourism. Zoos and rescue centers such as the Manila Zoo and Ninoy Aquino Parks and Wildlife Center offer safe and accessible ways to view endemic and exotic fauna. Specialized sanctuaries such as the Candaba Bird Sanctuary and the Masungi Georeserve protect specific ecosystems and their inhabitants. The Calauit Safari Park offers an experience more in line with African safari tours, as it hosts a mix of African and Philippine wildlife. Nationally protected areas such as the Mount Hamiguitan Wildlife Sanctuary, and Mount Apo National Park are key sites for ecotourism and scientific research.

A significant portion of wildlife tourism in the Philippines is framed as ecotourism, with revenues often going to support local communities and funding conservation efforts for vulnerable species, managed by organizations like the Department of Environment and Natural Resources.

== Tourism activities ==
=== Beaches and diving ===
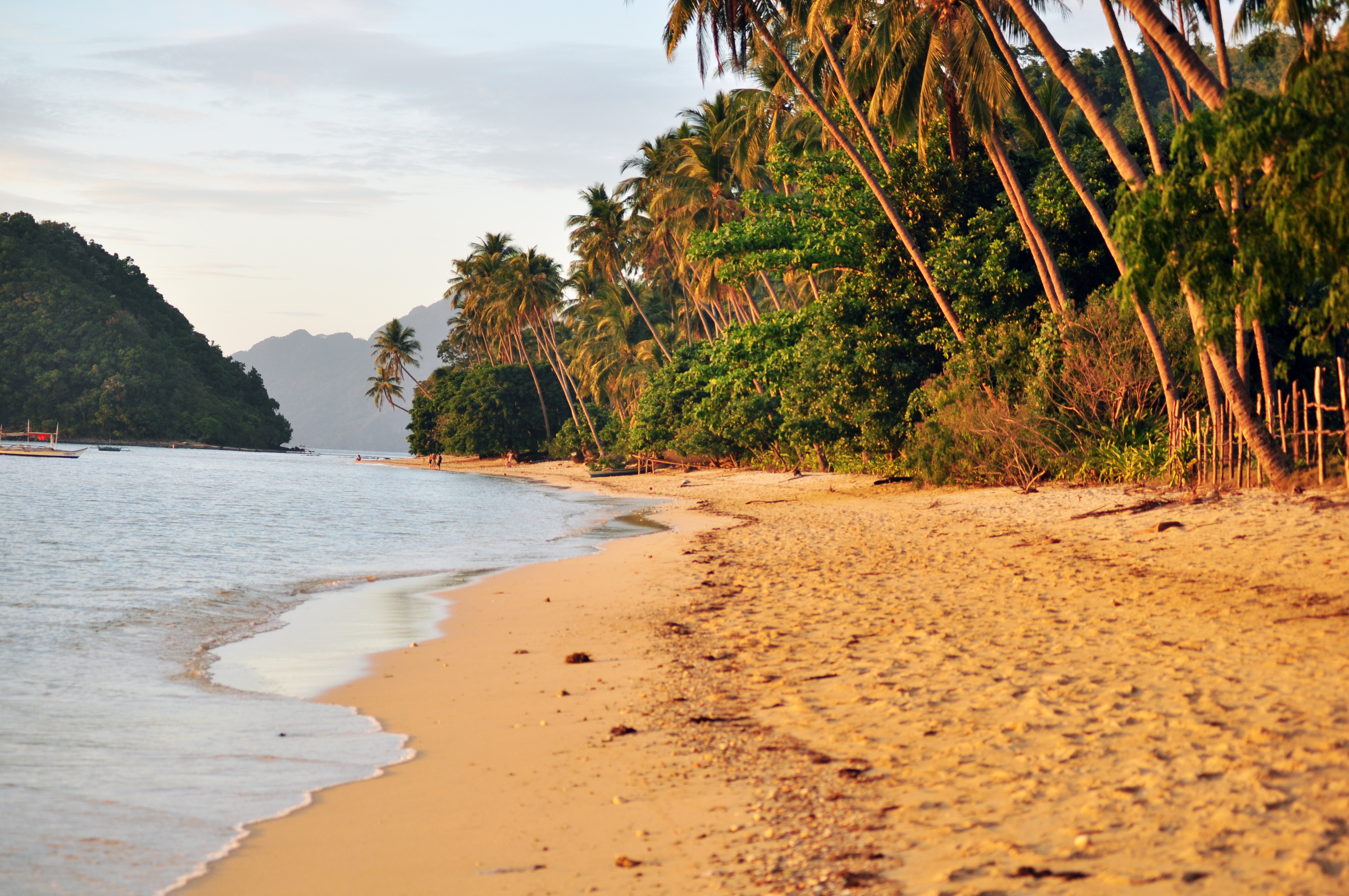
A beach in El Nido, Palawan

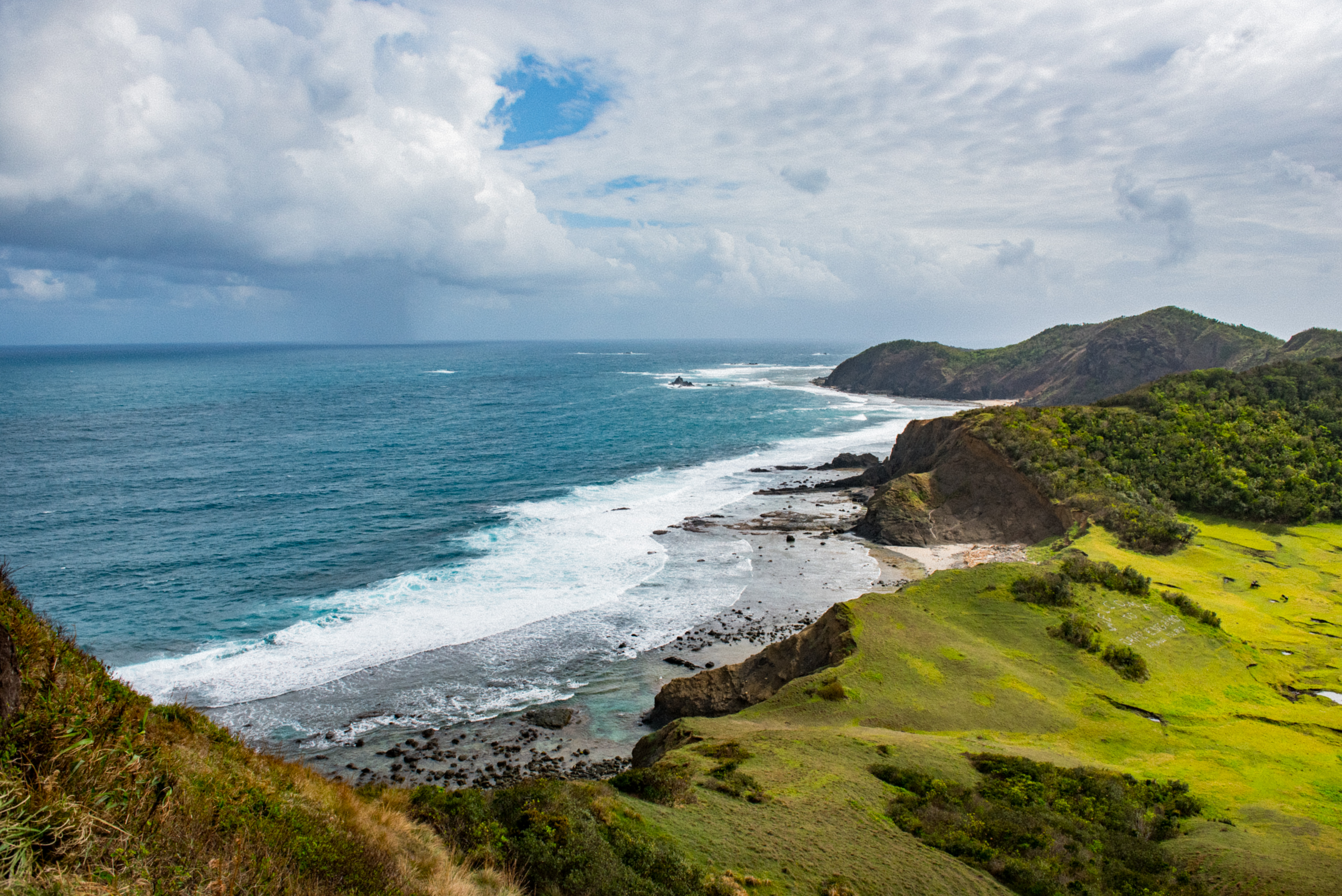
Palaui Island in Cagayan Valley

Various beaches in the Philippines have landed in multiple magazine rankings. Among the most popular beach and diving choices in the country include Boracay, El Nido, Coron, Cebu, and Siargao.

In 2018, Canadian-based travel agency Flight Network listed Hidden Beach in Palawan (No. 1) as the best beach in all of Asia. The beach was also cited by Travel+Leisure as among the 13 places to see the bluest water in the world. Other beaches ranked from the Philippines were Guyam White Sand Beach in Siargao (No. 13), Palaui Beach in Cagayan Valley (No. 22), Caramoan Island Beach in Camarines Sur (No. 29), Dahican Beach in Mati, Davao Oriental (No. 41), Gumasa Beach in Sarangani (No. 45), Alona Beach in Panglao, Bohol (No. 46), Kalanggaman Island in Leyte (No. 49), and Paliton Beach in Siquijor (No. 50).

=== Surfing ===
Surfing in the Philippines is a sport in the country that is generating economic activity due to surf tourism, a form of sports tourism.

The island of Siargao is considered as the Surfing Capital of the Philippines and the location of the Cloud 9. La Union is called the Surfing Capital of the Northern Philippines and is considered as the “Birthplace of Philippine Surfing.”

The United Philippine Surfing Association is the official National Sports Association for Surfing in the Philippines recognized by the Philippine Sports Commission.

=== Hiking ===
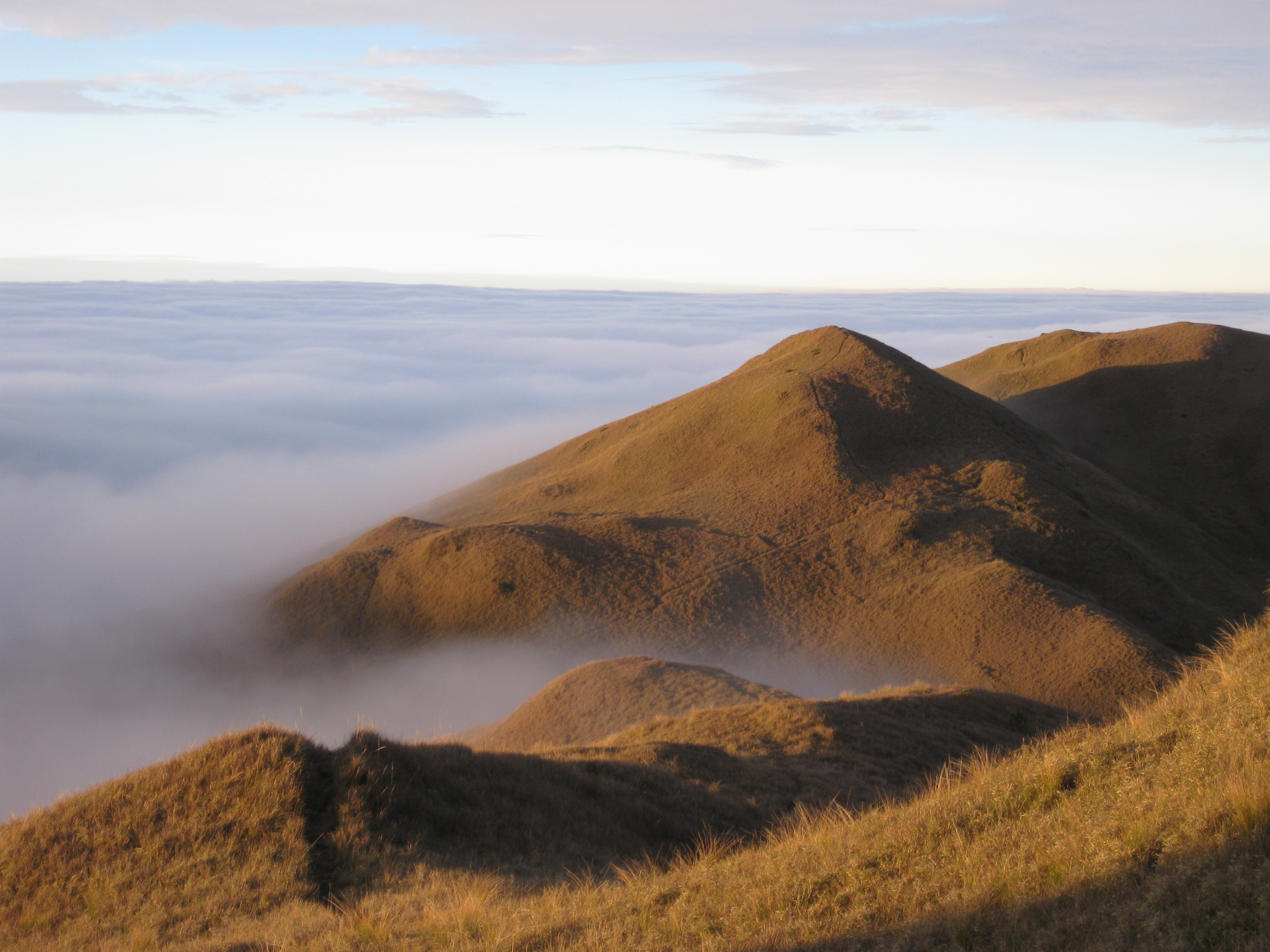
Mount Pulag is the highest peak in the island of Luzon

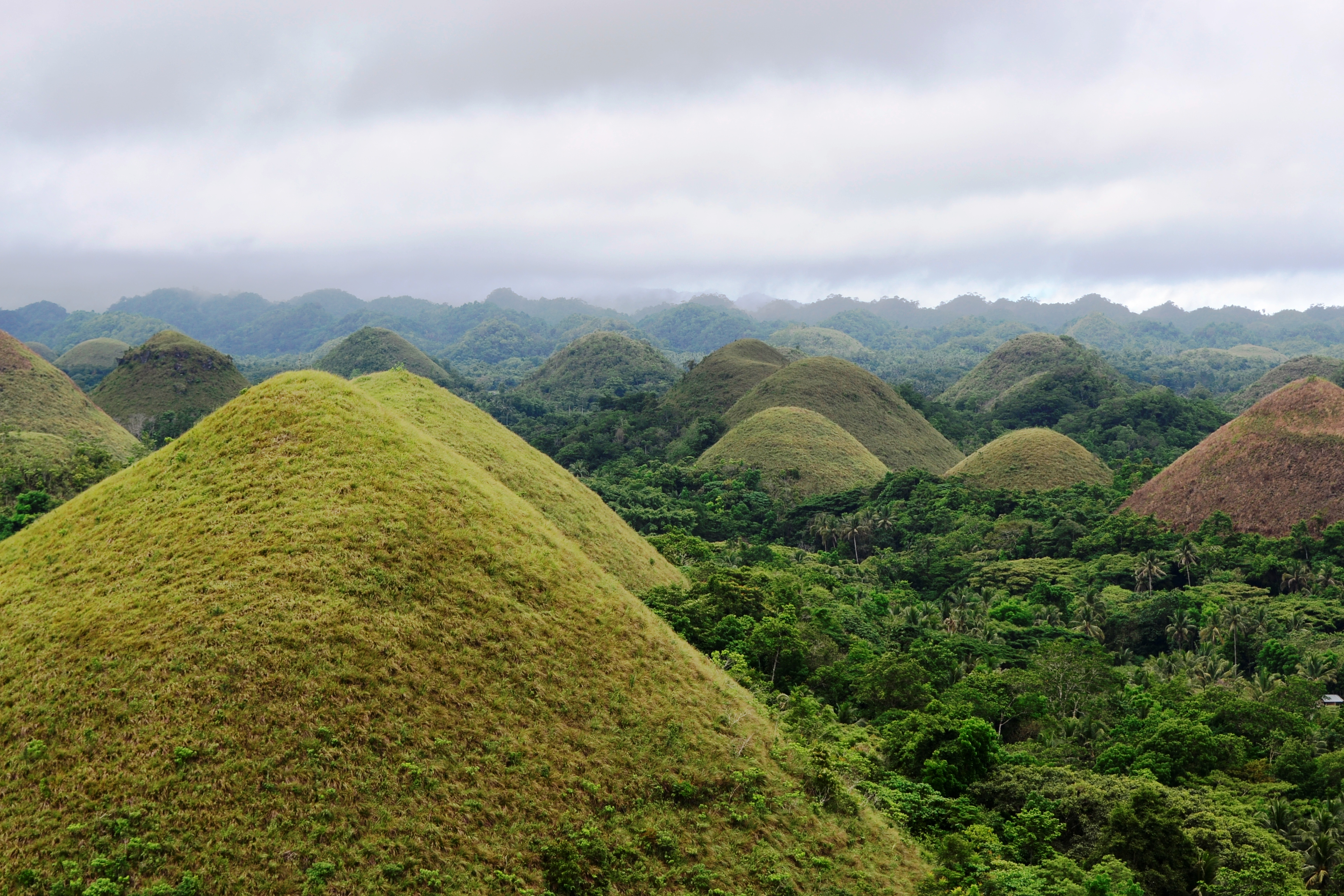
Chocolate Hills, a geologic natural monument in Bohol and a UNESCO Tentative Site

Among the most famous hiking areas in the country are Mount Apo, Mount Pinatubo, Mount Halcon, Mount Banahaw, Mount Makiling, and Mount Pulag. An Online magazine, Culture Trip, cited Mount Batulao in Batangas, Masungi Georeserve in Rizal, Tarak Ridge in Bataan, Mount Daraitan and Maynoba in Rizal, Kibungan Circuit in Benguet, and Mount Pulag in Nueva Vizcaya for having the most spectacular hiking trails in the country in 2017.

=== Research and education ===
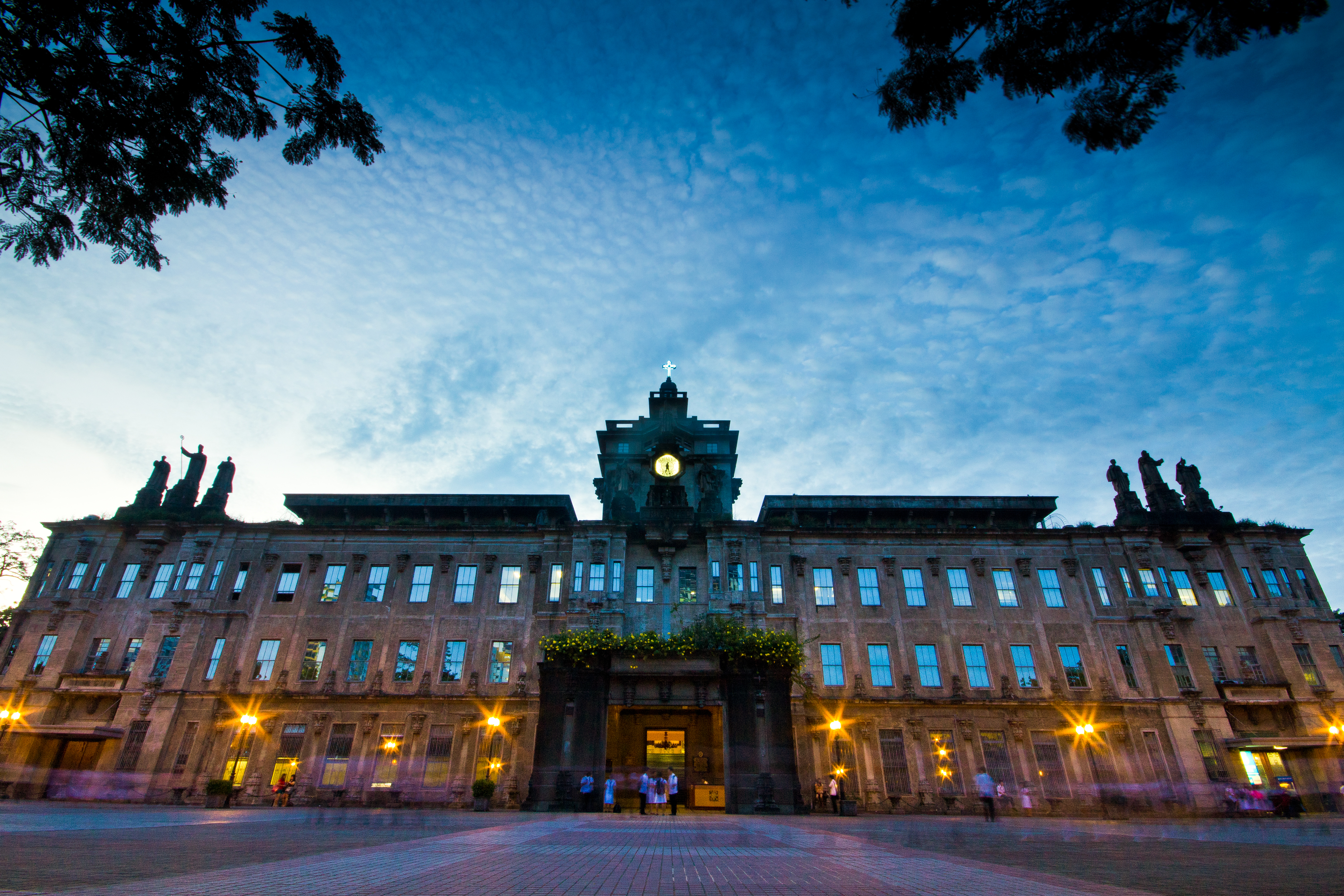
The University of Santo Tomas possesses the oldest extant university charter in Asia.

Due to the country's diverse flora and fauna, researchers from around the world have visited various biodiversity sites in Philippine environmental corridors. Among the big draws for environmental researchers are Mount Mantalingajan, Sibuyan Island, Dinagat Islands, Mount Hamiguitan, Central Panay Mountain Range, Verde Island Passage, Tubbataha Reef, Mount Malindang, Northern Sierra Madre Natural Park, and Turtle Islands, Tawi-Tawi. Many local and foreign archaeologists and anthropologists have also visited the country's archaeological sites, such as Cagayan Valley, Butuan, Tabon Cave, Callao Cave, Banton, Ifugao, Cebu, Lanao del Sur, and many others.

Visitors seeking graduate degrees or reviewer sessions in the Philippines usually come from India, South Korea, and Palau. Language schools with English language programs are also popular among Asian foreigners from South Korea, Thailand, Vietnam, Myanmar, Taiwan, and Japan. Government-approved institutions that teach Philippine mythology and suyat scripts, such as baybayin, have also become popular among locals and foreigners.

=== Arts and crafts tourism ===
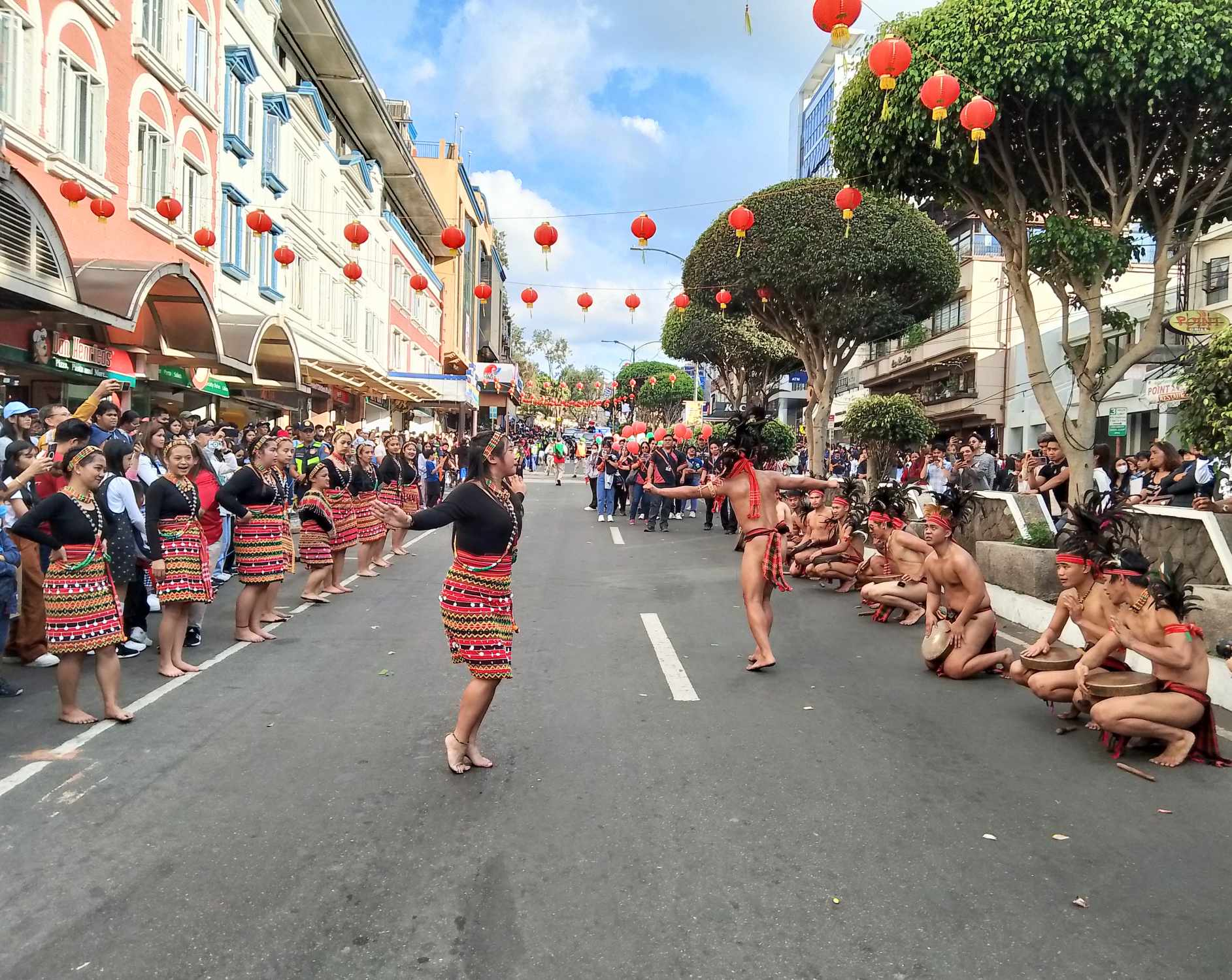
A group of Cordilleran students showcasing a tribal dance along Session Road in Baguio City

Arts and crafts tourism in the Philippines has recently expanded following several attempts to establish a cultural renaissance. The country was conferred its first UNESCO Creative City through Baguio in 2016. Other arts and crafts centers are in Manila, Quezon City, San Fernando City, Iloilo City, Angono, Santiago, Cebu City, Basey, Davao City, Lake Sebu, Angeles City, Vigan, Basco, Zamboanga City, Marawi, Tugaya, Cotabato City, Sariaya, Tagbilaran, and Dumaguete.

=== Pilgrimage ===
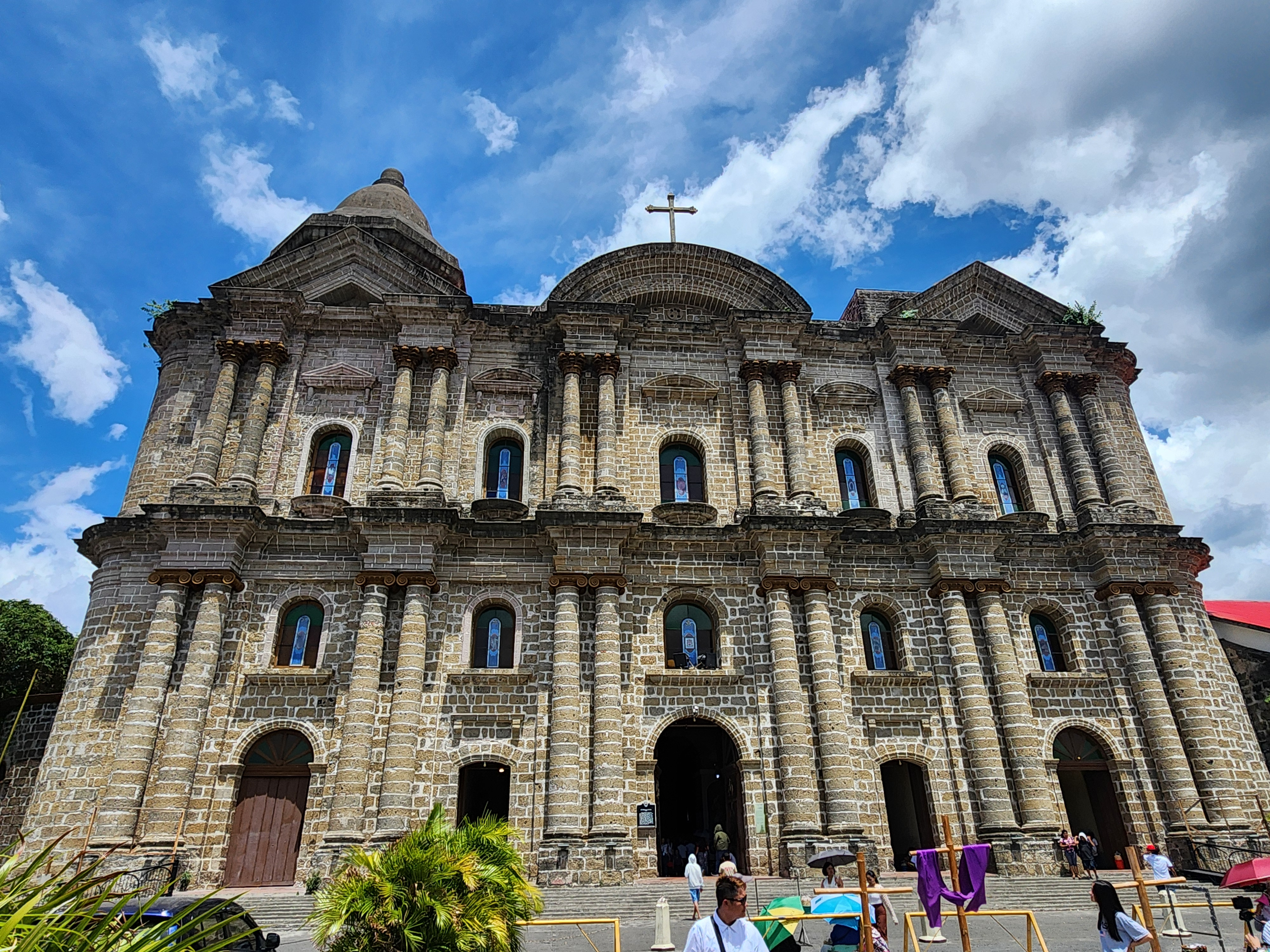
Taal Basilica, the largest church in Asia

The Philippines is the Catholic pilgrimage capital of Asia, possessing hundreds of olden churches, most of which were established between the 15th to 19th centuries through the earthquake baroque architecture. Historic mosques, temples, and indigenous places of worship such as dambanas are also present throughout the country. Popular pilgrimage sites in the country include Antipolo Church, Paoay Church, Quiapo Church, Manaoag Church, Taal Basilica, and Naga Cathedral.

=== Festivals ===
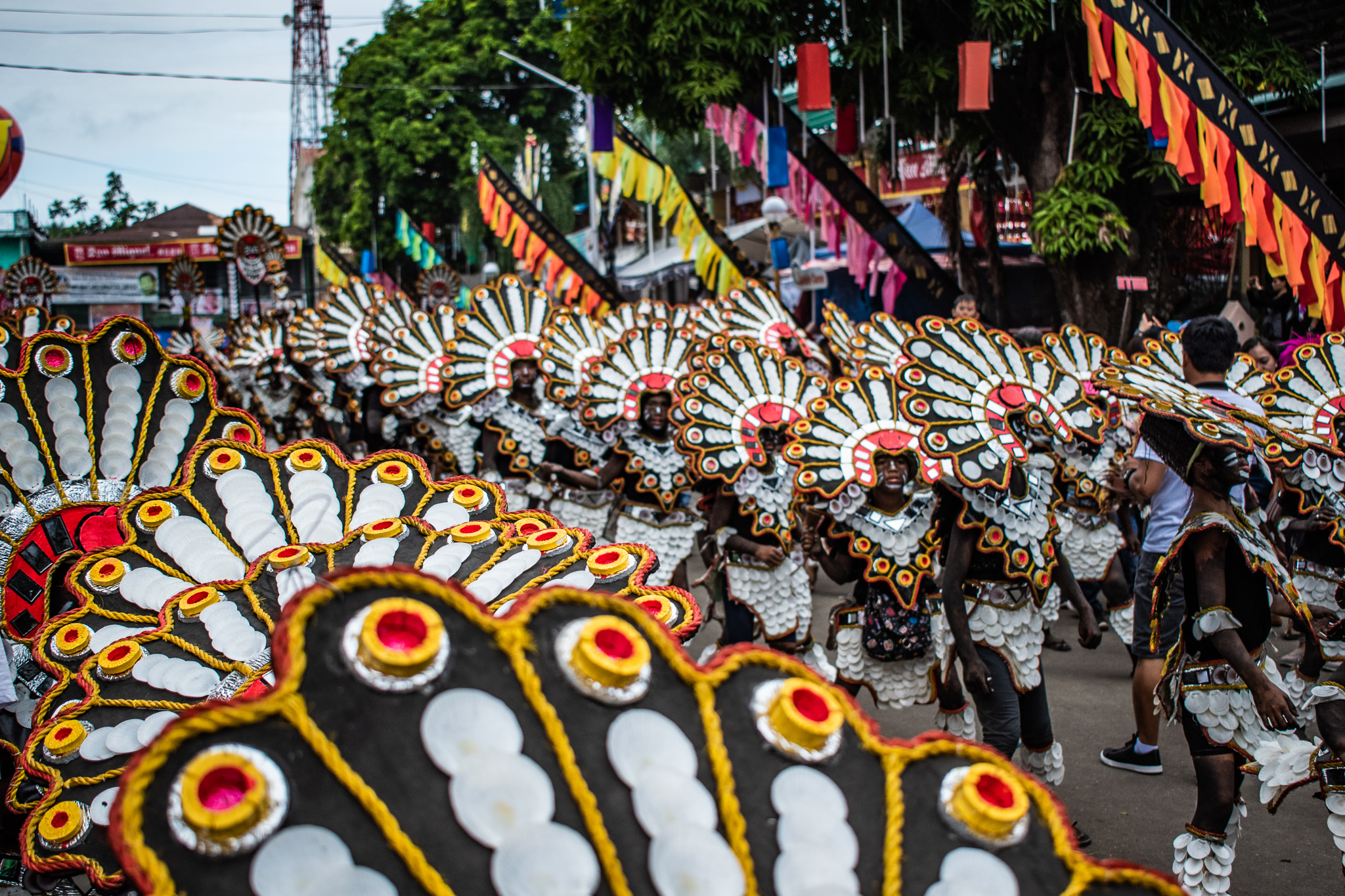
Participants at the Ati-Atihan festival

The country has thousands of festivals, most of which are annual spectacles. Each of the festivals, locally known as fiesta, have different traditions at play, and may be religious or secular in nature. Among the most popular include the Ati-Atihan Festival of Aklan, Sinulog Festival of Cebu, the Dinagyang Festival of Iloilo, the Panagbenga Festival of Baguio, the Moriones Festival of Marinduque, and the MassKara Festival of Bacolod.

== Protection and restoration ==
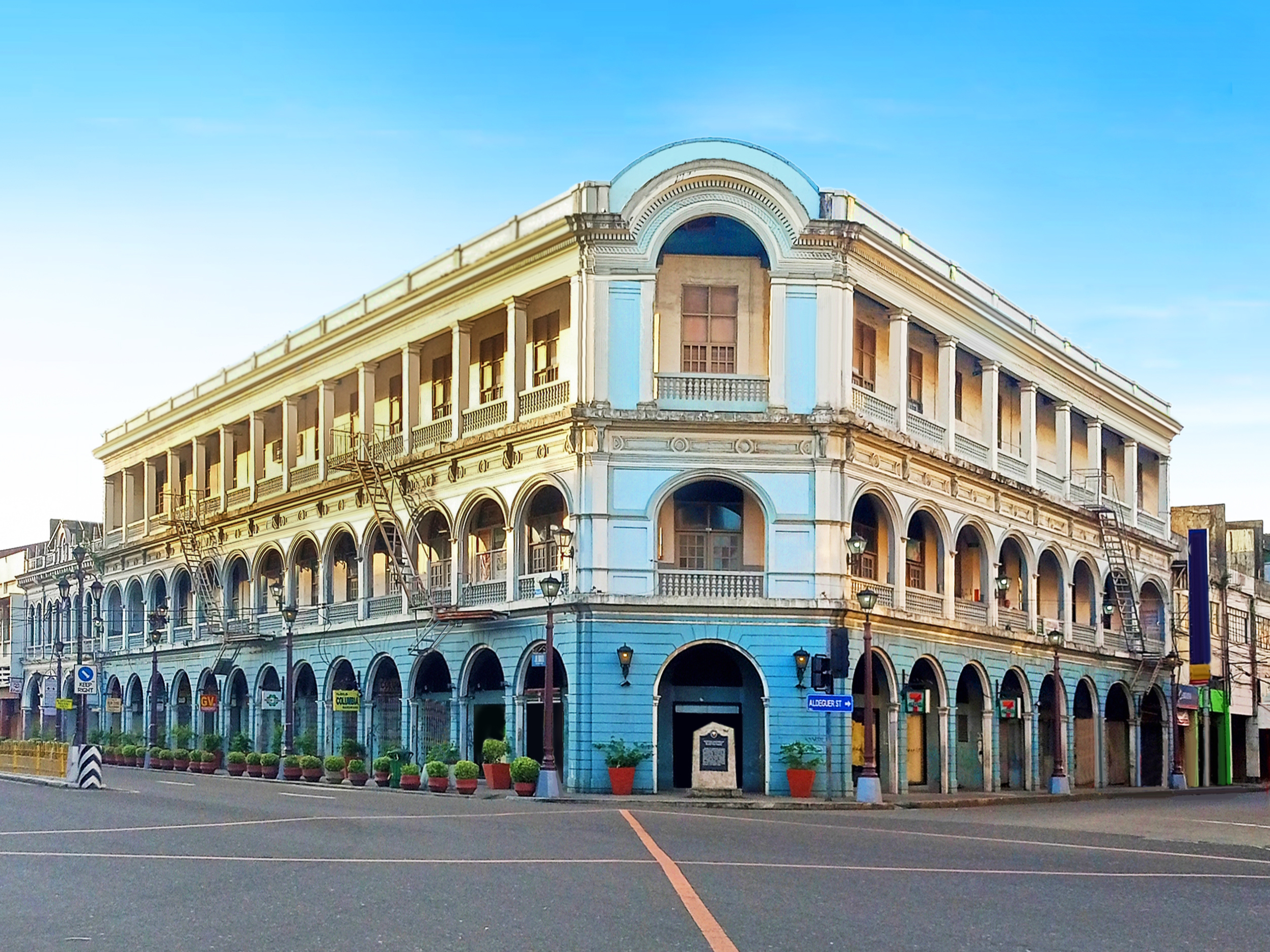
Villanueva Building (Calle Real) in Iloilo City

The Philippines has numerous heritage towns and cities, but many of these were intentionally destroyed by the Japanese through fire tactics in World War II and by the Americans through bombings during the same war. After the war, the government of the Empire of Japan did not provide funds to the Philippines for the restoration of the heritage towns they destroyed, effectively destroying any chances of restoration; since the pre-war Philippines' economy was devastated and had limited financial resources. Furthermore, the United States gave minimal funding for only two of the hundreds of cities they destroyed: Manila and Baguio. Today, only the centers (poblacion or downtown areas) remain in most of the expansive heritage cities and towns in the country.

However some heritage cities still exist in their pre-war state, such as the UNESCO city of Vigan which was the only heritage town saved from American bombing and Japanese fire and kamikaze tactics. The country currently lacks a city/town-singular architectural style law. Due to this, unaesthetic cement or shanty structures have taken over heritage buildings, destroying many former heritage townscapes. Some heritage buildings have been demolished or sold to corporations, and have been replaced by commercial structures such as shopping centers, condominium units, or newly-furnished modern-style buildings, completely destroying the old aesthetics of many former heritage towns and cities. Only the heritage city of Vigan has a town law that guarantees that its unique architecture (the Vigan colonial style) shall always be used in constructions and reconstructions. However Silay, Iloilo City, and San Fernando de Pampanga have ordinances giving certain tax exemptions to owners of heritage houses. In 2010, the Philippine Cultural Heritage Act passed into law, protecting all cultural heritage properties of the Philippines. Nevertheless, many ancestral home owners continue to approve the demolition of ancestral structures.

== Visa policy ==
The visa policy of the Philippines is governed by Commonwealth Act No. 613, also known as the Philippine Immigration Act, and by subsequent legislation amending it. The Act is jointly enforced by the Department of Foreign Affairs (DFA) and the Bureau of Immigration (BI).

Generally, foreign nationals who wish to enter the Philippines require a visa unless:

- He/she is a citizen of a member state of the Association of Southeast Asian Nations (ASEAN)
- He/she is a citizen of a non-ASEAN member state whose nationals are allowed to enter the Philippines visa-free
- He/she is a balikbayan and is only returning to the Philippines temporarily

Nationals of 157 foreign countries are visa-free for 14 days, 30 days, or 59 days. Of more than 200 countries and territories, 39 need visas to enter the Philippines.

== Immigration and customs ==
=== Entry guidelines for temporary visitors ===
Nationals traveling to the Philippines for business and tourism purposes are allowed to enter the Philippines obtaining visa on arrival for a stay not exceeding 30 days, provided they hold valid tickets for their return journey to port of origin or next port of destination. However, immigration officers at ports of entry may exercise their discretion to admit holders of passports valid for at least sixty days beyond the intended period of stay.

=== Customs ===
Upon arriving, visitors are allowed to bring in duty-free personal belongings, two cartons of cigarettes or two tins of pipe tobacco and up to one liter of alcohol. Exceeding this is illegal. Balikbayans have separate rules and should check with the embassy or consulate in their home city.

=== Currency regulations ===
It is illegal for any incoming or outgoing passenger to bring in or out Philippine pesos in excess of $10,000.00 without prior authority from the Bangko Sentral ng Pilipinas. Any violation of this rule may lead to its seizure and civil penalties and / or criminal prosecution.

The transportation of foreign currency or monetary instruments is legal. However, the carrying of foreign currency in excess of US$10,000.00 or its equivalent in other foreign currencies must be declared to a Customs Officer or the Bangko Sentral ng Pilipinas. Violation of this rule may lead to seizure and sanctions, fines and / or penalties.

== Transportation ==
Terminal 2 interior of Mactan–Cebu International Airport, the main gateway to the Central Visayas Region

=== Air transportation ===
Currently, there are 16 airports classified by the Civil Aviation Authority of the Philippines as International Airports. There are also hundreds of principal domestic airports and community airports throughout the country. The international airports include:

- Bacolod–Silay International Airport in Silay, Negros Occidental
- Bicol International Airport in Legazpi, Albay
- Bohol–Panglao International Airport in Panglao, Bohol
- Cagayan North International Airport in Lal-lo, Cagayan
- Clark International Airport in Mabalacat, Pampanga
- Francisco Bangoy International Airport in Davao City
- General Santos International Airport in General Santos
- Iloilo International Airport in Cabatuan, Iloilo
- Kalibo International Airport in Kalibo, Aklan
- Laguindingan International Airport in Laguindingan, Misamis Oriental
- Laoag International Airport in Laoag, Ilocos Norte
- Mactan–Cebu International Airport in Lapu-Lapu City, Cebu
- Ninoy Aquino International Airport in Pasay / Parañaque
- Puerto Princesa International Airport in Puerto Princesa
- Subic Bay International Airport in Morong, Bataan
- Zamboanga International Airport in Zamboanga City

=== Sea transportation ===
The country traditionally used sea vehicles since pre-colonial times. The archipelagic country has four areas of ports concentration, as administered by the Philippine Ports Authority. These areas are the South China Sea ports area, Philippine Sea ports area, Celebes Sea ports area, and Inland Seas ports area. Each area has hundreds of ports serving local and international ships and other sea vehicles.

== International Tourism Offices ==
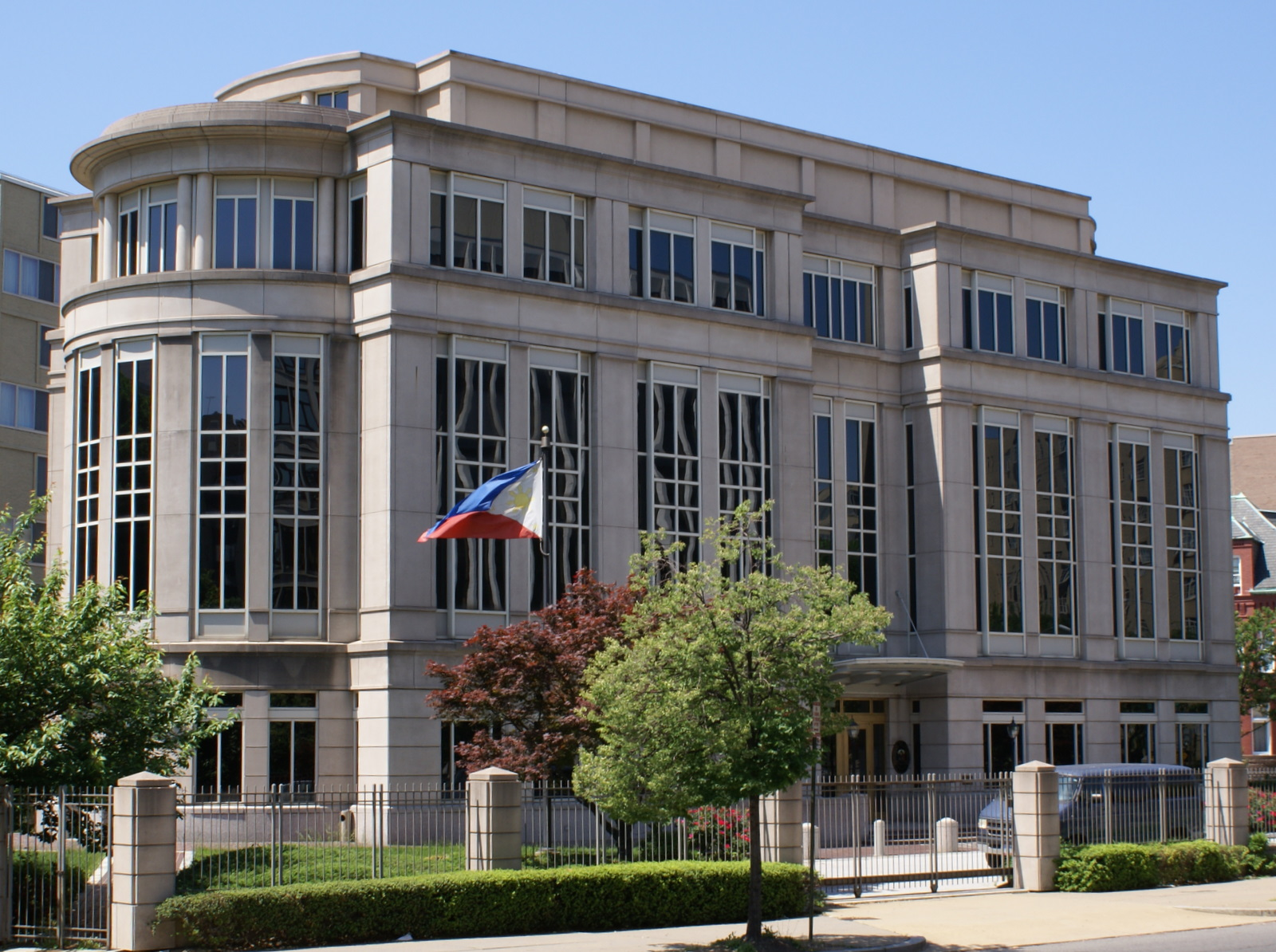
Philippine Embassy in Washington, D.C.

Every town and city in the Philippines has at least one tourism office. The country has also established numerous tourism offices in various foreign countries. The international tourism offices include:

- Tokyo, Japan
- Osaka, Japan
- Seoul, South Korea
- Petaling Jaya, Malaysia
- Singapore
- Taipei, Taiwan
- Bangkok, Thailand
- Ho Chi Minh, Vietnam
- Jakarta, Indonesia
- New Delhi, India
- Mumbai, India
- Beijing, China
- Shanghai, China
- Sydney, Australia
- London, United Kingdom
- Frankfurt, Germany
- Moscow, Russia
- Madrid, Spain
- Milan, Italy
- Paris, France
- Dubai, UAE
- Toronto, Canada
- New York, USA
- San Francisco, USA
- Los Angeles, USA

Embassies and consulates of the Philippines throughout the world also serve as de facto international tourism offices.

== Threats ==
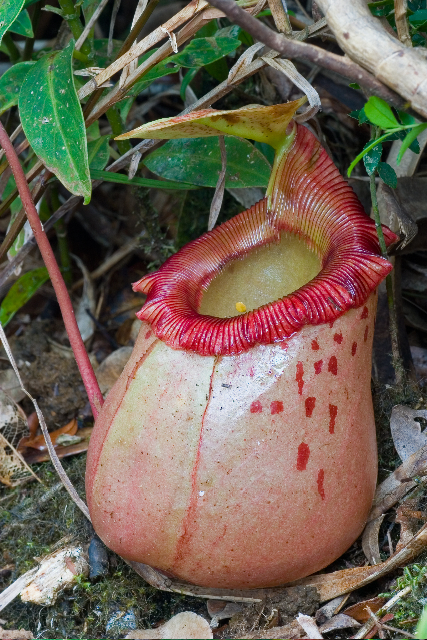
Nepenthes sibuyanensis (Pitcher Plant) from the protected Sibuyan Island

Terrorism may pose the greatest threat to tourists' safety in the Philippines, notably in the southern regions bordering Malaysia. The far-southern region is widely known as a no-go zone for foreign visitors. Areas surrounding Marawi and other parts of the island are considered unsafe due to violent activities of rebel groups which include the Maute Group.

Certain militant Islamist groups such as Abu Sayyaf and Jema'ah Islamiyah are particularly dangerous, since they are responsible for the majority of recent attacks, which have included bombings, piracies, kidnappings and killings of foreign nationals if their government failed to pay the demanded ransom.

Other threats include cultural heritage destruction due to damage, demolition, or looting of heritage structures, and urbanization of younger generations away from indigenous traditions, causing various rituals and practices to fade away. Threats to natural heritage include mining, severe population growth, urbanization, introduction of invasive species, deforestation, water pollution, air pollution, and climate change.

== See also ==
- Visa policy of the Philippines
- Philippine Registry of Cultural Property
- List of festivals in the Philippines
- Arts of the Philippines
- List of beaches in the Philippines
- Architecture of the Philippines
- Biosphere reserves of the Philippines
- Intangible Cultural Heritage of the Philippines
- Lists of Cultural Properties of the Philippines
- Archaeology of the Philippines
- List of national parks of the Philippines
- World Heritage Sites in the Philippines
- Israeli overtourism in Siargao

== Notes ==
1. ^{1} Taken from the website of the Department of Tourism. No data given for Bangsamoro Region.
