= Brazilians in the Philippines =

Ethnic group in the Philippines

Total population
- 10,708 (2000), 155 (2020)

Regions with significant populations
- Metro Manila

Languages
- Brazilian Portuguese and Philippine languages

Religion
- Christianity

Related ethnic groups
- Brazilians, Brazilian diaspora, Filipino Brazilians

Brazilians in the Philippines form the country's 10th-largest group of foreign residents, according to the 2000 Philippines census.

== Business and employment ==
Since 2004, there has been a wave of Brazilian models coming to the Philippines for work. Many of these models are of Japanese heritage. They look somewhat like Filipinos but with more "chiseled features", which has been an advantage to them in finding jobs in the Philippines. Brazilians are attracted to the modelling industry in the Philippines because, unlike other countries in the region such as Thailand and China, English is widely spoken. Photographers feel that Brazilian models are less inhibited than their Filipino counterparts, and reject accusations that race or ethnicity has anything to do with their hiring decisions. However, in many cases the models speak only Portuguese, and have limited educational background.

Brazilian models have been criticised by their domestic competitors for working at low fees, as little as P1,500 for a gig in comparison to typical local rates of P5,000 to P10,000 per show. The Professional Models Association of the Philippines has particularly been critical of the influx of Brazilian models. However, Brazilian actors themselves respond that there are many overseas Filipino workers in different countries around the globe including Brazil, and they have no desire to displace local talent. Models have to get permits from the Bureau of Immigration, and renew them every two months. In a few cases, BI officers have raided fashion shows and arrested models who were working illegally. However the PMAP claims that when they reported illegal models to the BI, the BI responded that they had bigger issues to deal with, and declined to follow up on the reports. Actor Lemuel Palayo made public complaints about Brazilian models, but then later retracted them and apologised. In November 2010, Phoemela Baranda also made public statements that the Philippines needed better laws to protect models against competition from Brazilians, and suggested imposing taxes on the employment of foreign models. However, other Filipino actors such as Wendell Ramos, Paolo Contis, JC Tiuseco, Aljur Abrenica, and Mark Herras have stated that they are not concerned by the increased competition.

== Culture and organizations ==
There are some Brazilian missionaries in the Philippines. The Brazilian Christian social action organization Pastoral da Criança has an outreach and food distribution program in Daet, Camarines Norte. The Conselho de Representantes de Brasileiros no Exterior, a Brazilian diaspora organization, has had a representative-candidate from the Philippines since 2010: Fabiana Mesquita, a native of Santos, São Paulo, whose husband's work with the World Health Organization brought him to the Philippines. She has participated in Brazilian social initiatives in the Philippines, and has also promoted the teaching of Portuguese to Brazilian children abroad.

Another example of Brazilian cultural influence in the Philippines is the Brasilipinas annual celebration. It began in 2007 as a sort of mini-Brazilian Carnival in Metro Manila, organised by a local capoeira school, but has also been held around Christmas time as well. The most recent celebration was in 2011. It is typically held at Rockwell Center in Makati.

== Notable people ==
- Daniel Matsunaga, model and actor, Pinoy Big Brother All In Big Winner
- Fabio Ide, model and actor
- Daiana Menezes, actress, model, and television hostess with the GMA Network
- Priscilla Meirelles, actress, model, and 2004 Miss Earth pageant winner
- Akihiro Sato, male model

== See also ==
- Brazil–Philippines relations
- Brazilian diaspora
- Immigration to the Philippines
- Filipino Brazilians
