= Andrea D. Domingo =

Filipino politician and chief executive officer (born 1949)

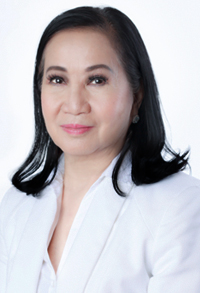
- Official portrait, 2022

Chairman & CEO of the Philippine Amusement and Gaming Corporation
- In office July 1, 2016 – August 23, 2022
- Appointed by: Rodrigo Duterte
- Preceded by: Cristino Naguiat Jr.
- Succeeded by: Alejandro Tengco

Commissioner of the Bureau of Immigration
- In office January 23, 2001 – December 2003
- Appointed by: Gloria Macapagal Arroyo
- Preceded by: Rufus Rodriguez
- Succeeded by: Alipio Fernandez Jr.
- In office December 22, 1989 – March 17, 1992
- Appointed by: Corazon Aquino
- Preceded by: Bienvenido Alano
- Succeeded by: Bayani Subido

Member of the House of Representatives from Pampanga’s 3rd district
- In office June 30, 1992 – June 30, 1995
- Preceded by: Oscar Samson Rodriguez
- Succeeded by: Oscar Samson Rodriguez

Personal details
- Born: Andrea Ocampo Dizon; November 30, 1949 (age 76) San Fernando, Pampanga, Philippines
- Party: Independent (1995–present)
- Other political affiliations: Lakas (1992–1995)
- Spouse: Rolando Domingo
- Children: 3
- Education: University of the Philippines Diliman (BA)
- Occupation: Politician, chief executive officer

Andrea "Didi" Dizon Domingo (born Andrea Ocampo Dizon; November 30, 1949) is a Filipino politician and chief executive officer. She was chairman and CEO of the Philippine Amusement and Gaming Corporation (PAGCOR) from 2016 to 2022.

== Early life and education ==
Domingo was born on November 30, 1949, in San Fernando, Pampanga to Vicente Dizon and Valentina Ocampo. She studied University of the Philippines Diliman with the degree of Bachelor of Arts in journalism.

== Career ==
In 1989, Domingo became a commissioner for Bureau of Immigration until 1992.

In 1992, Domingo was represented the third district of Pampanga for one term.

In 2001, Domingo returned as commissioner of the Bureau of Immigration.

From 2007 to 2010, Domingo was general manager and CEO of the Philippine Reclamation Authority.

In 2016, Domingo was appointed as chairman and CEO for Philippine Amusement and Gaming Corporation by President Rodrigo Duterte.

== Personal life ==
Domingo is married to Rolando Domingo and has three children.

== Electoral performance ==
=== 1995 ===
1995 Philippine House of Representatives elections
Candidate	Party	Votes	%
Oscar Samson Rodriguez	Laban ng Demokratikong Pilipino	77,397	57.99
Andrea D. Domingo (incumbent)	Lakas–NUCD–UMDP	56,058	42.01
Total		133,455	100.00
Source: Commission on Elections

=== 1992 ===
1992 Philippine House of Representatives elections
Candidate	Party	Votes	%
Andrea D. Domingo	Lakas–NUCD	68,602	56.19
Oscar Samson Rodriguez (incumbent)	Laban ng Demokratikong Pilipino	45,576	37.33
Vicente Macalino	Nationalist People's Coalition	7,468	6.12
Aurelio Villanueva	Kilusang Bagong Lipunan	440	0.36
Total		122,086	100.00
Source: Commission on Elections
