= Filipino immigration to Brazil =

Brazilians of Filipino birth or descent

Filipino Brazilians
Total population
- 29,578 (2020)

Regions with significant populations
- São Paulo and Rio de Janeiro

Languages
- Brazilian Portuguese and Philippine languages

Religion
- Christianity

Filipino Brazilians are Brazilian citizens who are descendants of Filipino ancestry. The Filipino community in Brazil did not receive large Filipino immigrants compared to the United States and Canada. In 2008, it was estimated that there were just over 300 Filipinos residing in Brazil, including Catholic missionaries and migrant workers in the telecommunications, oil and domestic services sectors.

In 2017 and 2018, they were one of the nationalities that had the most authorization to work in the country, with 2,100 and 1,700 people respectively.

== See also ==
- Brazil–Philippines relations
- Filipino diaspora
- Immigration to Brazil
- Brazilians in the Philippines
