= Philippine Immigration Act =

National Assembly of the Philippines
- Long title: An Act to Control and Regulate the Immigration of Aliens into the Philippines
- Territorial extent: Philippines
- Passed by: National Assembly of the Philippines
- Passed: August 26, 1940
- Status: In force

The Philippine Immigration Act of 1940, also known as Commonwealth Act no. 613, is a law establishing the Bureau of Immigration of the Philippines and establishing the visa policy of the Philippines.

The law was passed on August 26, 1940 by the National Assembly of the Philippines. Its long name is "An Act to Control and Regulate the Immigration of Aliens into the Philippines."

== Exclusion ==
The law contains several categories of persons to be excluded from the country. The common grounds for exclusion are persons likely to become a public charge, persons who have been convicted of a crime involving moral turpitude and persons not properly documented.

== Amendments ==
The Act has been amended many times:

- Republic Act No. 118, (An Act Requiring Aliens Seeking to Enter the Philippines to Pay the Sum of Fifty Pesos for Each Certificate of Residence, Thereby Amending Item (10) of Paragraph (A) of Section Forty-Two of Commonwealth Act Numbered Six Hundred and Thirteen). Approved on June 7, 1947.
- Republic Act No. 135, (An Act to Amend Subsection (a) of Section 42 of Commonwealth Act No. 613, Entitled "An Act to Control and Regulate the Immigration of Aliens Into the Philippines," and to Repeal Subsections (x) and (y) of Section 1414 of the Revised Administrative Code). Approved on June 14, 1947.
- Republic Act No. 144, (An Act to Amend Sections Six, Thirty-Seven, Forty-Two, Forty-Four, Forty-Five and Forty-Six of Commonwealth Act Numbered Six Hundred and Thirteen, Entitled "An Act to Control and Regulate the Immigration of Aliens into the Philippines," and to Insert a New Section in Said Act to be Known as Section Twenty-Two-A). Approved on June 14, 1947.
- Republic Act No. 503, (An Act to Amend Certain Section of Commonwealth Act No. 613, Otherwise Known as the "Philippine immigration Act of 1940"). Approved on June 12, 1950.
- Republic Act No. 749, (An Act to Amend Certain Section of Commonwealth Act No. 613, Otherwise Known as the "Philippine immigration Act of 1940", as Amended). Approved on June 18, 1952.
- Republic Act No. 827, (An Act to Amend Section 46 of Commonwealth Act No. 613, Otherwise Known as the "Philippine immigration Act of 1940", as Amended). Approved on August 14, 1952.
- Republic Act No. 1901, (An Act to Amend Commonwealth Act No. 613, Otherwise Known as the "Philippine Immigration Act of 1940", as Amended). Approved on June 22, 1957.
- Republic Act No. 4376, (An Act Amending Section Thirteen of Commonwealth Act Numbered Six Hundred Thirteen, Otherwise Known as "The Philippine Immigration Act of 1940" so as to Include as Non-Quota Immigrants Who May be Admitted into the Philippines, Natural Born Citizens Who Have Been Naturalized in a Foreign Country and Desire to Return for Permanent Residence). Approved on June 19, 1965.
- Republic Act No. 5171, (An Act to Facilitate the Entry into the Philippines of International Traders and Investors of Foreign Nationality, Amending for the Purpose Subparagraph (d) of Section Nine of Commonwealth Act Numbered Six Hundred Thirteen, Otherwise Known as the Philippine Immigration Act of 1940, as Amended by Republic Act Numbered Five Hundred and Three). Approved on August 4, 1967.
- Republic Act No. 5701, (An Act to Amend Section 46 of Commonwealth Act No. 613, Otherwise Known as the "Philippine immigration Act of 1940", as Amended). Approved on June 21, 1969.
- Presidential Decree No. 524, (Amending Section 42 of the "Philippine Immigration Act of 1940", as Amended (Providing for New Fees)). Approved on July 31, 1974.

== See also ==
- Immigration to the Philippines
