= Brazil–Philippines relations =

- Brazil: Philippines

Diplomatic mission
- Embassy of Brazil, Manila: Embassy of the Philippines, Brasília

Envoy
- Ambassador Gilberto Fonseca Guimarães de Moura: Ambassador Patrick John Uytiepo Hilado

Brazil–Philippines relations (Portuguese: Relações entre Brasil e Filipinas; Filipino: Ugnayang Pilipinas at Brasil) are the bilateral relations between Brazil and the Philippines. Brazil has an embassy in Manila and the Philippines maintain an embassy in Brasília. Both nations were conquered by the Iberian powers, namely by Spain and Portugal, in the 16th century.

== Bilateral relations ==
Brazilian president Luiz Inácio Lula da Silva and Philippine president Bongbong Marcos during Lula's state visit to Manila, 14 November 2026

In 2011, Philippine foreign secretary Albert del Rosario signed three agreements with Brazilian foreign minister Antonio Patriota to undertake the cooperation on both countries on socio-economic development, effective implementation of agrarian reform, and combating drug trafficking. Brazil and the Philippines signed a memorandum of understanding that aims to improve sports cooperation between the two countries. The memorandum provides the Philippines and Brazil for sports cooperation through the exchange of expertise in areas such as institutional cooperation and training of sports specialists and practitioners. Brazilian ambassador Jorge Fernandes sought to expand the political, economic, cultural and educational ties between Brazil and the Philippines. Filipinos do not visit Brazil as much as Brazilians visit the Philippines. He also wanted to pursue another agreement with Philippine Airlines to establish a direct flight from Manila to Brazil.

On 13–15 November 2026, Brazilian president Luiz Inácio Lula da Silva paid a state visit to the Philippines at the invitation of Philippine president Bongbong Marcos. Lula became the first sitting President of Brazil to visit the Philippines.

== Economic relations ==
In June 2009, the Philippines and Brazil made their pledges as they signed mutual cooperation agreements in the fields of bio-energy and agriculture. The two countries committed themselves to take the necessary steps to implement the signed Memorandum of Understanding on Cooperation in Agriculture and the Memorandum of Understanding on Bioenergy Cooperation. The Philippines and Brazil signed six memoranda of understanding and agreements on the development and production of renewable energy, and agriculture cooperation. It intends to “facilitate technical cooperation... on the production and use of biofuels, particularly ethanol, and promote the expansion of bilateral trade and investment in biofuel.” Brazilian export to the Philippines reach more than $300 million in 2007.

== Brazilians in the Philippines ==
Since 2004, there has been a wave of Brazilian models coming to the Philippines for work. Many of these models are of Japanese heritage. They look somewhat like Filipinos but with more "chiseled features", which has been an advantage to them in finding jobs in the Philippines. Brazilians are attracted to the modelling industry in the Philippines because, unlike other countries in the region such as China and Thailand, English is widely spoken. Photographers feel that Brazilian models are less inhibited than their Filipino counterparts and reject accusations that race or ethnicity has anything to do with their hiring decisions. However, in many cases the models speak only Portuguese and have limited educational background.

Brazilian models have been criticized by their domestic competitors for working at low fees, as little as P1,500 for a gig in comparison to typical local rates of P5,000 to P10,000 per show. The Professional Models Association of the Philippines has particularly been critical of the influx of Brazilian models. However, Brazilian actors themselves respond that there are many overseas Filipino workers in different countries around the globe including Brazil, and they have no desire to displace local talent. Models have to get permits from the Bureau of Immigration, and renew them every two months. In a few cases, BI officers have raided fashion shows and arrested models who were working illegally. However the PMAP claims that when they reported illegal models to the BI, the BI responded that they had bigger issues to deal with, and declined to follow up on the reports. Actor Lemuel Palayo made public complaints about Brazilian models, but then later retracted them and apologized. In November 2010, Phoemela Baranda also made public statements that the Philippines needed better laws to protect models against competition from Brazilians, and suggested imposing taxes on the employment of foreign models. However, other Filipino actors such as Wendell Ramos, Paolo Contis, JC Tiuseco, Aljur Abrenica, and Mark Herras have stated that they are not concerned by the increased competition.

== Culture and organizations ==
There are some Brazilian missionaries in the Philippines. The Brazilian Christian social action organization Pastoral da Criança has an outreach and food distribution program in Daet, Camarines Norte. The Conselho de Representantes de Brasileiros no Exterior, a Brazilian diaspora organization, has had a representative-candidate from the Philippines since 2010: Fabiana Mesquita, a native of Santos, São Paulo, whose husband's work with the World Health Organization brought him to the Philippines. She has participated in Brazilian social initiatives in the Philippines, and has also promoted the teaching of Portuguese to Brazilian children abroad.

Another example of Brazilian cultural influence in the Philippines is the Brasilipinas annual celebration. It began in 2007 as a sort of mini-Brazilian Carnival in Metro Manila, organised by a local capoeira school, but has also been held around Christmas time as well. The most recent celebration was in 2016. It is typically held at Rockwell Center in Makati.

== Controversy ==
Philippine Ambassador to Brazil Marichu Mauro was fired from her post after GloboNews released a series of CCTV camera footage showing Mauro constantly maltreating a 51-year-old Filipina maid inside the diplomatic residence in Brazil dated from March to October 2020. On March 1, 2021, President Rodrigo Duterte approved the dismissal of Mauro.

== See also ==
- Foreign relations of Brazil
- Foreign relations of the Philippines
