= Bureau of Immigration (Philippines) =

Philippine government agency responsible for immigration control and deportation

- Kawanihan ng Imigrasyon
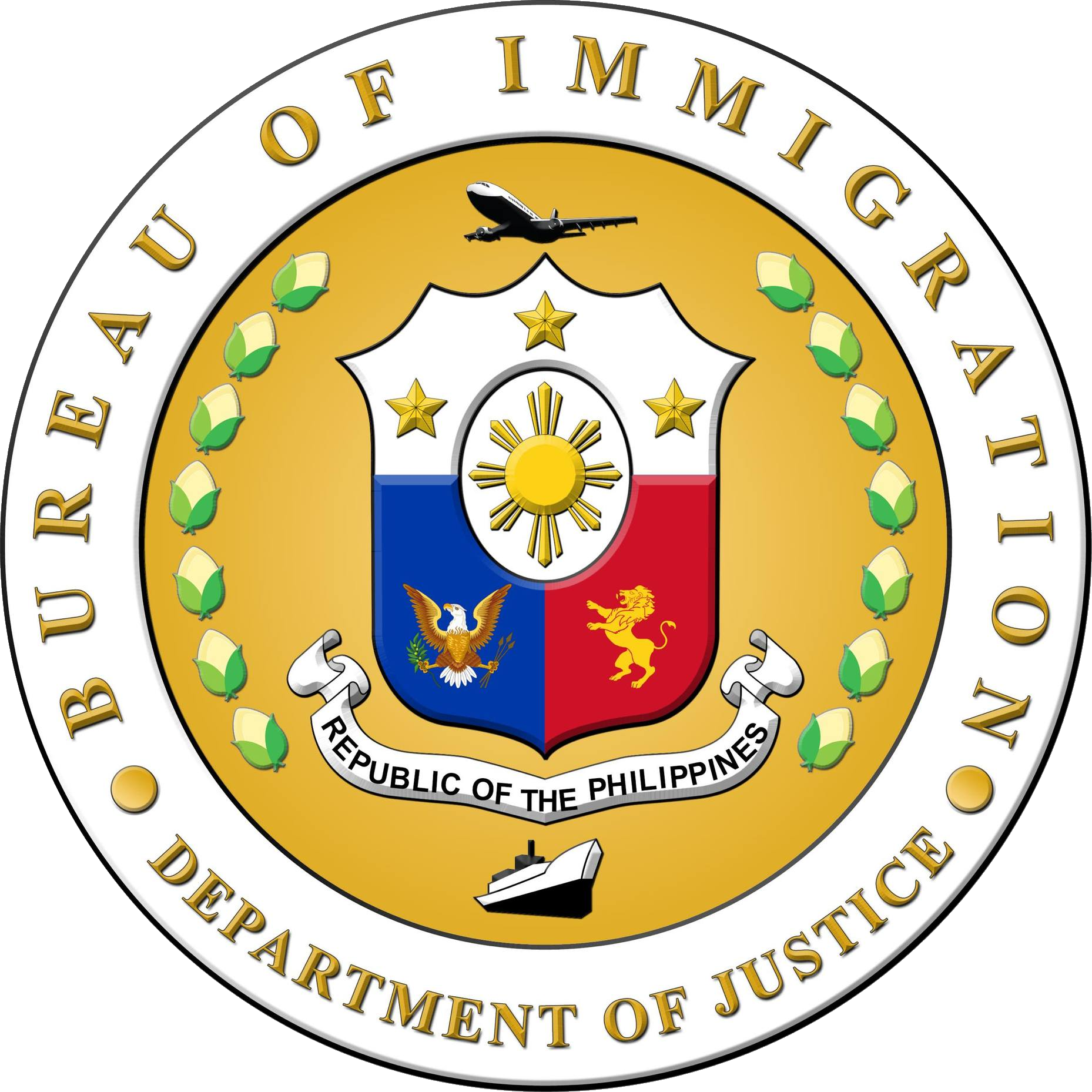

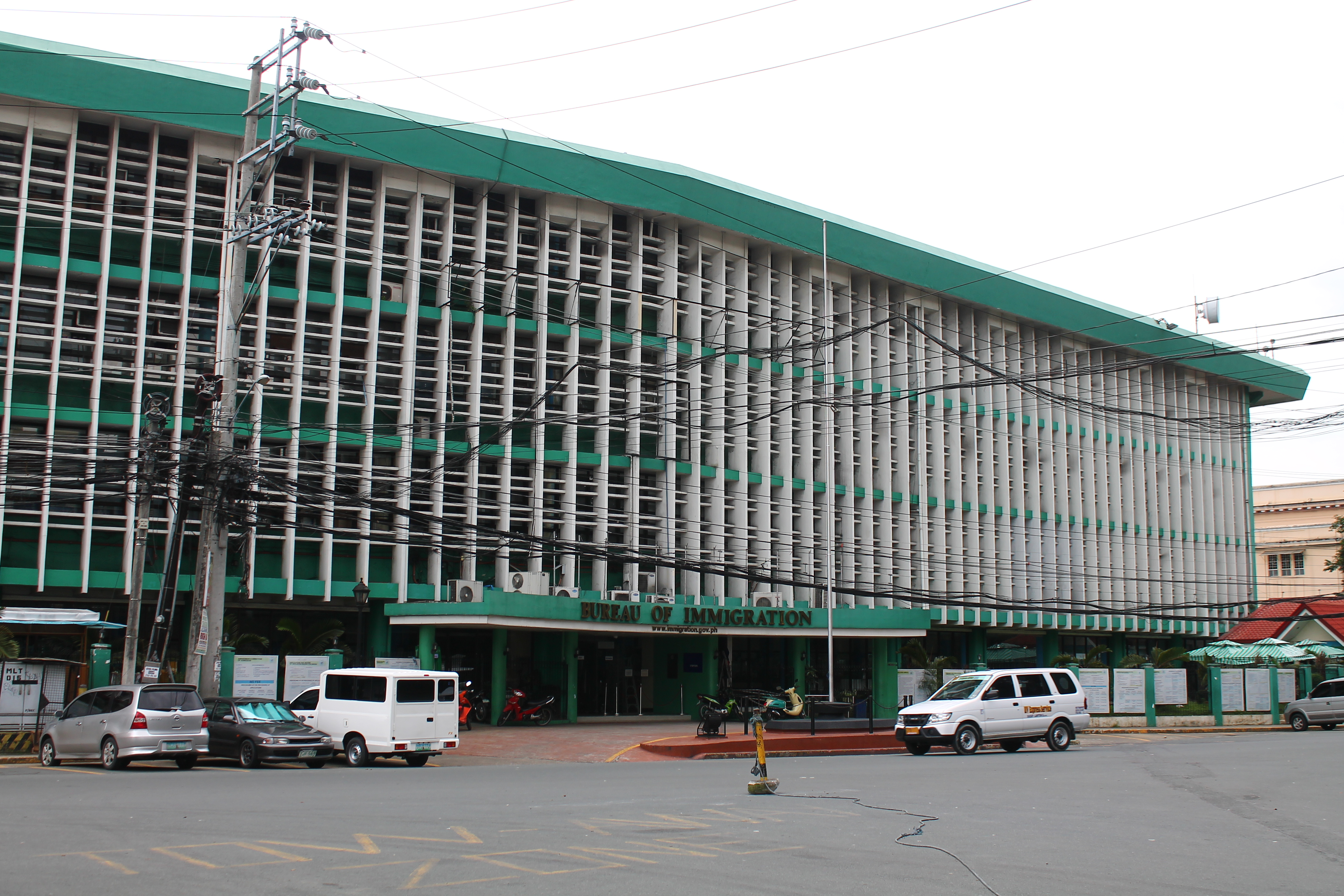
- Bureau of Immigration Building in Plaza de Mexico, Intramuros, Manila

Agency overview
- Formed: January 22, 1940
- Jurisdiction: Government of the Philippines
- Headquarters: Bureau of Immigration Main Office, Magallanes Drive, Intramuros, Manila
- Motto: Patriotism, Integrity, Professionalism
- Employees: 2,257 (2024)
- Annual budget: ₱1.61 billion (2023)
- Minister responsible: Fredderick A. Vida OIC, Secretary of Justice
- Agency executives: Joel Anthony M. Viado, Commissioner; Joel Alejandro S. Nacnac, Deputy Commissioner; Theodore V. Pascual, Deputy Commissioner; Aldwin F. Alegre, Deputy Commissioner
- Parent agency: Department of Justice
- Website: immigration.gov.ph

The Bureau of Immigration (Filipino: Kawanihan ng Imigrasyon), also known between 1972 and 1987 as the Bureau of Immigration and Deportation, is the immigration regulatory and control body of the Philippines. It was established by the Philippine Immigration Act in 1940, although a predecessor agency had existed as part of the Bureau of Customs since 1899.

== History ==
The Bureau of Immigration started as a division of the Bureau of Customs (BOC) during the American regime in 1899. It was appropriate because ship travel and ship cargo were interlinked and hence, the office was at the BOC. It seems that the government then, gave more importance on the entry of goods than monitoring of foreign nationals coming into the country. The government was more interested in generating customs duties from these goods than in the control and regulation of the arrival and stay of foreigners. The functions of immigration remained under the said bureau until 1937 when it was transferred as a division of the Bureau of Labor.

The functions of Immigration were transferred in 1937 as a division under the Bureau of Labor. This was mainly to respond to the arrival of Chinese nationals who owned and operated trade houses stores and restaurants in the country.

On January 22, 1940, the Second National Assembly of the Philippine Commonwealth enacted the Philippine Immigration Act of 1940 (Commonwealth Act No. 613). It was signed into law by the President of the United States on September 3, 1940, creating the Bureau of Immigration under the administrative supervision of the Office of the President.

A year or so later, it became an attached agency of the Department of Justice (DOJ). Its administrative control was later returned to the Office of the President.

When the Pacific War broke out in December 1941, the Bureau, then under the Department of Justice, moved to the Bilibid Prison on Azcarraga Street (now Claro M. Recto Avenue).

Immediately after the war, the bureau was transferred near the Gate 1 of the South Harbor in Manila, then moved to Building No. 5 at the Customs Bureau at Gate 4. In 1945, in line with the reorganization plan of the government, the bureau was put under the supervision and control of the Department of Labor.

In 1948, the Bureau was reverted to the jurisdiction of the DOJ where it has remained up to the present time.

On September 21, 1972, then President Ferdinand E. Marcos proclaimed martial law, ordered and decreed the adoption and implementation of the Integrated Reorganization Plan.

Hence, the Commission on Reorganization issued Letter of Implementation No. 20, dated December 31, 1972 which embodies the plan, including among other things, the change of name of the office from the Bureau of Immigration to Commission on Immigration and Deportation. This became a collegian body and performing both administrative and quasi-judicial functions. It is composed of the commissioner and his two associate commissioners. Letter of Implementation No. 20 also abolished the Deportation Board and transferred its functions to the Board of Commissioners who gave them power to undertake deportation cases.

The bureau was given the sole authority to enforce and administer immigration and foreign nationals registration laws including the admission, registration, exclusion, and deportation and repatriation of foreign nationals. It also supervises the immigration from the Philippines of foreign nationals.

On July 25, 1987, President Corazon C. Aquino signed Executive order No. 292, also known as the Administrative Code of 1987. Said order renamed the office as the "Bureau of Immigration" (BI). However, it continues to perform all the powers and functions it had while still a commission, and its head of office still remains to be called "Commissioner" as provided under the DOJ.

In January 2024, the BI launched the #ShieldKids campaign that seeks interagency cooperation to prevent sex offenders from endangering children. Among its accomplishments was the arrest of American fugitive Tom Talmadge in General Mariano Alvarez, Cavite on April 23, 2026, with Talmadge being the identified perpetrator in the abduction and rape of a child in Tampa, Florida within the United States in November 1989.

== Key officials ==
- Joel Anthony M. Viado (Commissioner)
- Joel Alejandro S. Nacnac (Deputy Commissioner)
- Theodore V. Pascual (Deputy Commissioner)
- Aldwin F. Alegre (Deputy Commissioner)
- Rogelio D. Gevero Jr. (Chief, Immigration Regulation Division)
- Jose Carlitos Z. Licas (Chief, Alien Registration Division)
- Fortunato S. Manahan Jr. (Chief, Intelligence Division)
- Arvin Cesar G. Santos (Chief, Legal Division)
- Mary Ann Q. Caranto (Chief, Administrative Division)
- Judith F. Ferrera (Chief, Financial and Management Division)
- Ruben C. Casibang Jr. (Executive Chairman, Board of Special Inquiry)
- Zaniah V. Siton (Acting Chief, Verification and Compliance Division)
- Jasmin M. Jamiuddin (Chief, Planning and Policy Division)
- Jolly Bert G. Galeon (Chief, Management Information Systems Division)
- Cris M. Villalobos (Chief, Human Resource Development Division)

== Functions ==
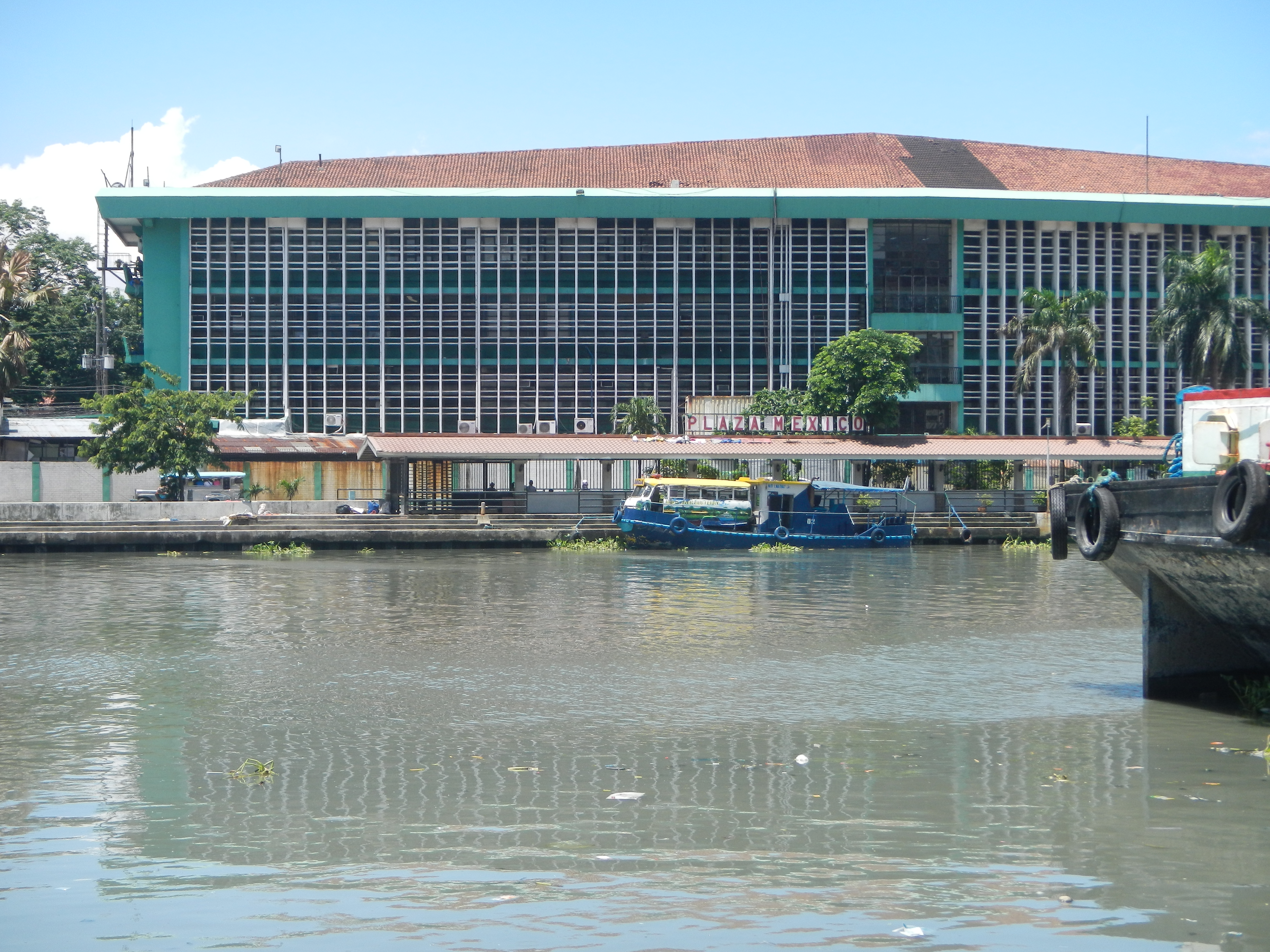
View of the Bureau of Immigration Building from Binondo across the Pasig River.

=== General functions ===
- Acts as the primary enforcement arm of the Department of Justice and the President of the Philippines in ensuring that all foreigners within its territorial jurisdiction comply with existing laws;
- Assists local and international law enforcement agencies in securing the tranquility of the state against foreigners whose presence or stay may be deemed threats to national security, public safety, public morals and public health and;
- Acts as chief repository of all immigration records pertaining to entry, temporary sojourn, admission, residence and departure of all foreigners in the country.

=== Specific functions ===
In the discharge of its broad functions, the Bureau through its Board of Commissioners, exercises administrative and quasi-judicial powers over the:

- Regulation of the entry (arrival), stay (sojourn), and exit (departure) of foreign nationals in the country;
- Monitoring of the entry and exit of Filipino citizens in compliance with Philippine laws and other legal procedures;
- Issuance of immigration documents and identification certifications on non-immigrant, immigrant and special non-immigrant visas;
- Issuance of special permits in relation to the enforcement of immigration laws (e.g. Special Work Permit (SWP), Provisional Permit to Work (PPW), Special Study Permit (SSP), re-entry permits, clearances, etc.);
- Extension of stay of temporary visitors and implementation of changes of status as provided by law;
- Administrative determination of citizenship and related status;
- Investigation, hearing, decision and execution of orders pertaining to exclusion, deportation, and repatriation of foreign nationals;
- Implementation of Hold Departure Orders, Blacklist, Watchlist, Immigration Lookout Bulletin Orders, and Alert List Orders;
- Cancellation of immigration documents upon violation of immigration laws and procedures;
- Investigation, arrests and detention of foreigners in violation of immigration regulation and other Philippine laws;
- Operation of the Bureau of Immigration Bicutan Detention Center and other such holding facilities;
- Accreditation of schools and learning institutions that can officially accept and enroll foreign students; and
- Accreditation of law firms, liaison officers, travel agencies and other individuals and organizations transacting with the Bureau of Immigration

== List of commissioners ==
#	Name	Tenure started	Tenure ended
1	Engracio Fabre	1945	1950
2	Jose P. Bengzon (1898–1990)	1950	1950
3	Vicente Dela Cruz	1951	1954
4	Emilio Galang	1954	1962
5	Martiniano P. Vivo	1962	1966
6	Edmundo M. Reyes	1967	1986
7	Enrique M. Joaquin	1986	1987
–	Ramon J. Liwag	1987	1988
8	Miriam Defensor Santiago (1945–2016)	January 4, 1988	July 17, 1989
9	Bienvenido P. Alano	July 4, 1989	December 21, 1989
10	Andrea D. Domingo	December 22, 1989	March 17, 1992
11	Bayani M. Subido	March 18, 1992	July 1992
12	Zafiro L. Respicio	July 3, 1992	August 1994
–	Ramon J. Liwag	August 1994	March 1995
13	Leandro I. Verceles Sr. (1927–1996)	March 6, 1995	July 12, 1996
–	Ramon J. Liwag	July 13, 1996	August 3, 1996
14	Edgar I. Mendoza	August 4, 1996	March 18, 1998
15	Rufus B. Rodriguez	July 1, 1998	January 20, 2001
16	Andrea D. Domingo	January 23, 2001	December 2003
17	Alipio F. Fernandez Jr. (1943–2018)	January 2004	March 27, 2007
18	Roy M. Almoro	March 28, 2007	May 1, 2007
19	Marcelino C. Libanan	May 2007	July 2010
–	Ronaldo P. Ledesma	August 2010	March 20, 2011
20	Ricardo A. David Jr.	March 18, 2011	July 16, 2013
21	Siegfried B. Mison	July 17, 2013	January 5, 2016
22	Ronaldo A. Geron	January 6, 2016	June 30, 2016
23	Jaime H. Morente	July 1, 2016	June 30, 2022
24	Norman G. Tansingco	September 12, 2022	September 9, 2024
25	Joel Anthony M. Viado	September 30, 2024	Incumbent
