= Surigao del Norte Provincial Board =

Legislative body of the province of Surigao del Norte, Philippines

Surigao del Norte Provincial Board Sangguniang Panlalawigan ng Surigao del Norte

Type
- Type: Unicameral
- Term limits: 3 terms (9 years)

Leadership
- Presiding Officer: Eddie Gokiangkee, Jr., Nacionalista since June 30, 2019

Structure
- Seats: 13 board members 1 ex officio presiding officer
- Political groups: Nacionalista (5); Lakas (4); PFP (1); Nonpartisan (2); Vacancy (1)
- Length of term: 3 years
- Authority: Local Government Code of the Philippines

Elections
- Voting system: Multiple non-transferable vote (regular members); Indirect election (ex officio members)
- Last election: May 12, 2025
- Next election: May 8, 2028

Meeting place
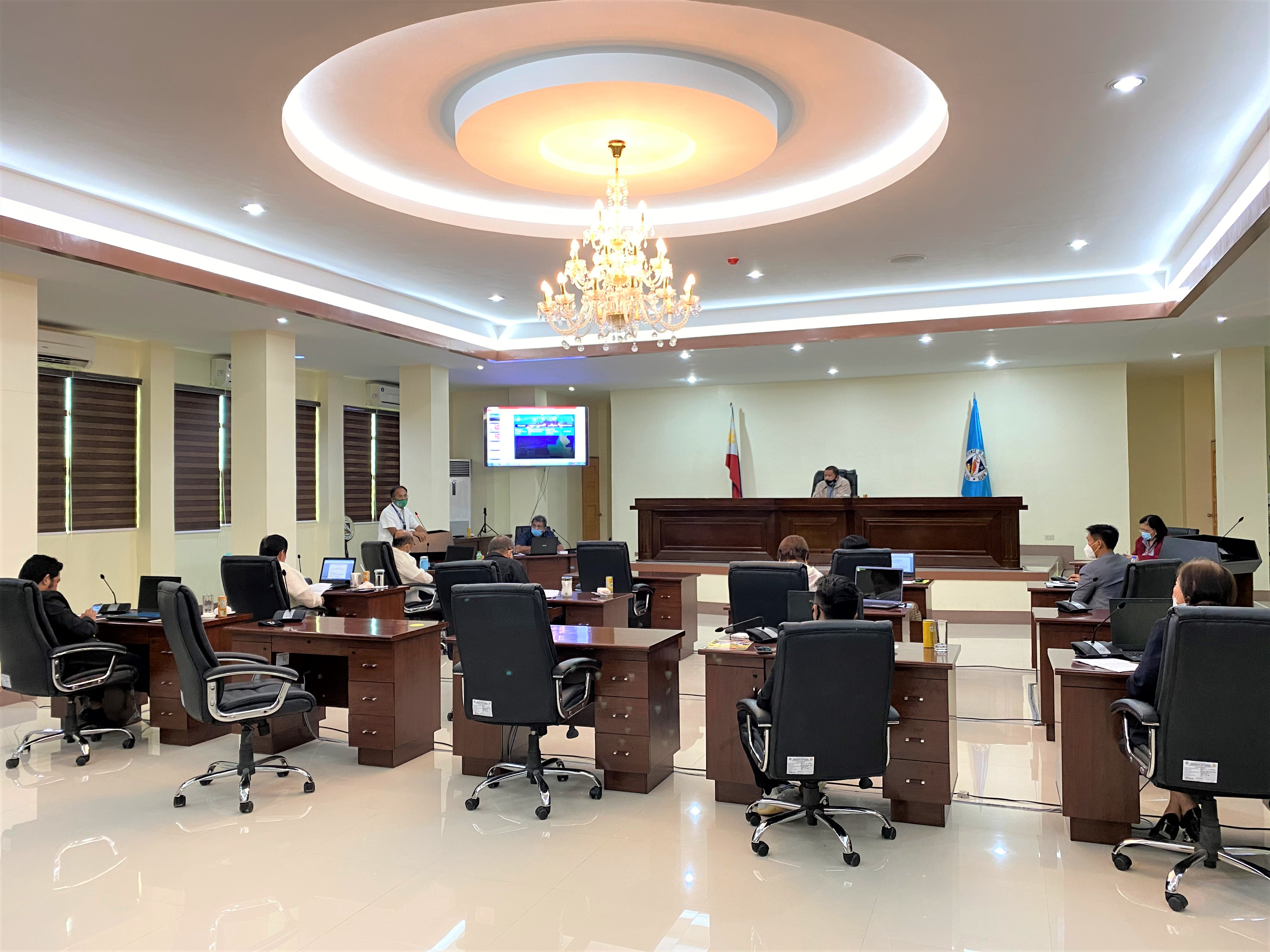
- Surigao del Norte Provincial Capitol, Surigao City

The Surigao del Norte Provincial Board is the Sangguniang Panlalawigan (provincial legislature) of the Philippine province of Surigao del Norte.

Most of its members are elected via plurality-at-large voting: the province is divided into two districts, each having five seats. A voter votes up to five names, with the top five candidates per district being elected. The vice governor is the ex officio presiding officer, and only votes to break ties. The vice governor is elected via the plurality voting system province-wide.

Aside from the regular members, the board also includes the provincial federation presidents of the Liga ng mga Barangay (ABC, from its old name "Association of Barangay Captains"), the Sangguniang Kabataan (SK, youth councils) and the Philippine Councilors League (PCL) as ex officio members. They join the board shortly after they are elected as president of their respective league or federation following the regular local elections (in the case of PCL) or the barangay and SK elections (in the case of ABC and SK).

== Apportionment ==
The districts used in the appropriation of members is coextensive with the legislative districts of Surigao del Norte.

Elections	Seats per district		Ex officio seats	Total seats
Elections	1st	2nd	Ex officio seats	Total seats
1992–1998	4	4	3	11
1998–present	5	5	3	13

== List of members ==
=== Current members ===
These are the members after the 2023 barangay and SK elections and the 2025 local elections.

The names of regular members are listed in order of their rank in the local election in their respective district.

- Vice Governor: Eddie Gokiangkee, Jr. (Nacionalista)

Seat	Board member	Party	Term number	Start of term	End of term
1st district	Veronico G. Solloso	Lakas	1	June 30, 2025	June 30, 2028
1st district	John T. Cubillan	Nacionalista	1	June 30, 2025	June 30, 2028
1st district	Aiken T. Andanar	Lakas	1	June 30, 2025	June 30, 2028
1st district	Catherine T. Gopico	PFP	2	June 30, 2022	June 30, 2028
1st district	Julecs C. Sunico	Lakas	3	June 30, 2019	June 30, 2028
2nd district	Noel Christian G. Catre	Nacionalista	1	June 30, 2025	June 30, 2028
2nd district	Victor F. Bernal	Nacionalista	2	June 30, 2022	June 30, 2028
2nd district	Michael Jose M. Patiño	Nacionalista	1	June 30, 2025	June 30, 2028
2nd district	Juan Fernando J. Larong	Lakas	3	June 30, 2019	June 30, 2028
2nd district	Kaiser B. Recabo Jr.	Nacionalista	2	June 30, 2022	June 30, 2028
ABC	Jaime A. Cortes	Nonpartisan	1	January 22, 2024	January 1, 2026
PCL	Vacant (Note: Vacant pending the election of a new set of officers of the province's Philippine Councilors League.)				June 30, 2028
SK	Goldwin P. Pegarro	Nonpartisan	1		January 1, 2026

=== Vice Governor ===
Election year	Name	Party
1992	Alejandrino Echin	NPC
1995	Regina Barbers	Lakas–NUCD
1998	Cruz Yuipco, Jr.	Lakas–NUCD
2001	Rodolfo Navarro	Lakas–NUCD
2004	Rodolfo Navarro	Lakas
2007	Noel Catre	Lakas
2010	Arturo Carlos Egay, Jr.	Lakas–Kampi
2013	Arturo Carlos Egay, Jr.	Liberal
2016	Arturo Carlos Egay, Jr.	Liberal
2019	Eddie Gokiangkee, Jr.	PDP–Laban
2022	Eddie Gokiangkee, Jr.	PDP–Laban
2025	Eddie Gokiangkee, Jr.	Nacionalista

=== 1st district ===
- Municipalities: Burgos, Dapa, Del Carmen, General Luna, Pilar, San Benito, San Isidro, Santa Monica, Socorro
- Population (2020): 136,092

Election year	Member (party)	Member (party)	Member (party)	Member (party)	Member (party)
1992	Dominador Taruc (LDP)	Elvis de la Merced (LDP)	Clarito Sering (LDP)	Reyneria Borja (NPC)	—
1995	Dominador Taruc (NPC)	Elvis de la Merced (NPC)	Edilberto Florendo (NPC)	Rumar Andanar (Lakas–NUCD)	—
1998	Rodolfo Navarro (Liberal)	Elvis de la Merced (Liberal)	Edilberto Florendo (Liberal)	Reyneria Borja (Lakas–NUCD)	Antioco Bonono (Lakas–NUCD)
2001	Jose Alabat, Jr. (Lakas–NUCD)	Norman Gopico (Lakas–NUCD)	Edilberto Florendo (Lakas–NUCD)	Reyneria Borja (LDP)	Merlinda Lagroma (Lakas–NUCD)
2004	Jose Alabat, Jr. (Lakas)	Norman Gopico (Lakas)	Elvis de la Merced (Lakas)	Allan I Ecleo (Lakas)	Merlinda Lagroma (Lakas)
2007	Jose Alabat, Jr. (Lakas)	Simeon Vicente Castrence (PSP)	Cesar Bagundol (Kampi)	Margarito Longos (Kampi)	Leonila Gorgolon-Licuan (Kampi)
2010	Mamerto Galanida (Lakas)	Simeon Vicente Castrence (PSP)	Cesar Bagundol (Lakas)	Margarito Longos (Lakas)	Edgar Andanar (Nacionalista)
2013	Mamerto Galanida (Liberal)	Simeon Vicente Castrence (PSP)	Cesar Bagundol (Liberal)	Margarito Longos (Liberal)	Leonila Gorgolon-Licuan (Liberal)
2016	Mamerto Galanida (Liberal)	Constantino Navarro IV (Liberal)	Edgar Andanar (Liberal)	Nathaniel Plaza (Liberal)	Leonila Gorgolon-Licuan (Liberal)
2019	Guillermo Boncaros (PDP–Laban)	Constantino Navarro IV (PDP–Laban)	Edgar Andanar (PDP–Laban)	Nathaniel Plaza (PDP–Laban)	Julecs Sunico (Nacionalista)
2022	Catherine Gopico (Nacionalista)	Constantino Navarro IV (PDP–Laban)	Edgar Andanar (PDP–Laban)	Nathaniel Plaza (PDP–Laban)	Julecs Sunico (PDP–Laban)
2025	Catherine Gopico (PFP)	John Cubillan (Nacionalista)	Aiken Andanar (Lakas–CMD)	Veronico Solloso (Lakas–CMD)	Julecs Sunico (Lakas–CMD)

=== 2nd district ===
- City: Surigao
- Municipalities: Alegria, Bacuag, Claver, Gigaquit, Mainit, Malimono, Placer, San Francisco, Sison, Tagana-an, Tubod
- Population (2020): 398,544

Election year	Member (party)	Member (party)	Member (party)	Member (party)	Member (party)
1992	Nila Pantejo (NPC)	Rene Medina (NPC)	Cruz Yuipco, Jr. (NPC)	Regina Alaan (Lakas–NUCD)	—
1995	Nila Pantejo (Lakas–NUCD)	Rene Medina (Lakas–NUCD)	Cruz Yuipco, Jr. (Lakas–NUCD)	Regina Alaan (Lakas–NUCD)	—
1998	Victor Bernal (Lakas–NUCD)	Rene Medina (Lakas–NUCD)	Adolfo Pantilo (Lakas–NUCD)	Manuel Tan (Lakas–NUCD)	Rosario Digao (Lakas–NUCD)
2001	Prince Elipe (Lakas–NUCD)	Isabelita Edera (Lakas–NUCD)	Luceniano Lancin (LDP)	Manuel Tan (LDP)	Rosario Digao (LDP)
2004	Victor Bernal (Lakas)	Isabelita Edera (Lakas)	Leo Philip Orquina (Lakas)	Noel Catre (Lakas)	Rohito Madelo (Lakas)
2007	Arturo Carlos Egay, Jr. (PSP)	Isabelita Edera (Lakas)	Melva Garcia (Lakas)	Regina Alaan (Lakas)	Victor Borja (Lakas)
2010	Myrna Romarate (Lakas)	Fernando Larong (Lakas)	Leonilo Aldonza (Nacionalista)	Regina Alaan (Nacionalista)	Victor Borja (Nacionalista)
2013	Myrna Romarate (Liberal)	Fernando Larong (Liberal)	Melva Garcia (Nacionalista)	Regina Alaan (Nacionalista)	Victor Borja (Liberal)
2016	Eddie Gokiangkee, Jr. (Liberal)	Fernando Larong (Liberal)	Melva Garcia (PDP–Laban)	Cristina Romarate-Arcillas (Nacionalista)	Cayetano Recabo (Nacionalista)
2019	Myrna Romarate (PDP–Laban)	Juan Fernando Larong (PDP–Laban)	Melva Garcia (PDP–Laban)	Elvira Egay (PDP–Laban)	Cayetano Recabo (PDP–Laban)
2022	Victor Bernal (Nacionalista)	Juan Fernando Larong (PDP–Laban)	Kent Yuipco (PDP–Laban)	Elvira Egay (PDP–Laban)	Kaiser Recabo, Jr. (PDP–Laban)
2025	Victor Bernal (Nacionalista)	Juan Fernando Larong (Lakas)	Noel Christian Catre (Nacionalista)	Michael Jose Patiño (Nacionalista)	Kaiser Recabo, Jr. (Nacionalista)

=== Liga ng mga Barangay member ===
Election year	ABC/LB President	Barangay Captain of
2018	Roger Pomoy	Bgy. Poblacion 2, Burgos
2023 (Note: Took office in 2024. Ma. Luz Eupeña briefly sat as ex officio member in her capacity as interim LB president in December 2023.)	Jaime Cortes	Bgy. Banbanon, San Francisco

=== Philippine Councilors League member ===
Election year	PCL President	Councilor in
2019	James Masuhay (PDP–Laban)	Sison
2022	Allan Turtur (PDP-Laban)	Placer
2025		

=== Sangguniang Kabataan member ===
Election year	SK President	SK Chairperson of
2018	Angelou Jess Lagus	Bgy. Tayaga (Pob. East), Claver
2023	Goldwin Pegarro	Bgy. Alambique, Gigaquit
