= Legislative districts of Surigao del Norte =

Philippine legislative districts

The legislative districts of Surigao del Norte are the representations of the province of Surigao del Norte in the various national legislatures of the Philippines. The province is currently represented in the lower house of the Congress of the Philippines through its first and second congressional districts. The 1st legislative district comprises nine municipalities on the islands of Siargao and Bucas Grande (plus smaller islands); the 2nd legislative district comprises Surigao City and eleven other municipalities on the mainland of Mindanao.

== History ==
Prior to gaining separate representation, areas now under the jurisdiction of Surigao del Norte were represented under the former province of Surigao (1907–1961).

The enactment of Republic Act No. 2786 on June 19, 1960, split the old Surigao province into Surigao del Norte and Surigao del Sur, and provided the new provinces separate representations in Congress. The new province of Surigao del Norte first elected its own representative in the 1961 elections.

Surigao del Norte was represented in the Interim Batasang Pambansa as part of Region X from 1978 to 1984, and returned one representative, elected at large, to the Regular Batasang Pambansa in 1984. The province was reapportioned into two congressional districts under the new Constitution which was proclaimed on February 11, 1987, and elected members to the restored House of Representatives starting that same year.

The passage of Republic Act No. 9355 and its subsequent ratification by plebiscite in December 2006 separated seven municipalities from Surigao del Norte's first congressional district to form the new province of Dinagat Islands, which began to elect its own representative in the 2007 elections. Despite Dinagat Islands being nullified as a province by the Supreme Court of the Philippines on February 11, 2010 the decision was not yet rendered final and executory before the 10 May 2010 elections; therefore the Commission on Elections still organized separate elections for the Dinagat Islands' congressional representative and provincial officials. The representatives of the reconfigured first district of Surigao del Norte and the lone district of Dinagat Islands continued to represent their respective constituencies even after the Supreme Court rendered its original decision final and executory on 18 May 2010.

After the Supreme Court reversed its previous ruling on April 12, 2011, and subsequently upheld with finality the constitutionality of Republic Act No. 9355 and the creation of Dinagat Islands as a province through an Entry of Judgment on October 24, 2012, the separation of Dinagat Islands from Surigao del Norte's first district became permanent.

== Current districts ==
Lakas–CMD (1)
Nacionalista (1)

Legislative districts and representatives of Surigao del Norte
District	Current Representative		Party	Constituent LGUs	Population (2020)	Area	Map
District	Image	Name	Party	Constituent LGUs	Population (2020)	Area	Map
1st		Francisco Matugas (since 2025); Dapa, Siargao	Lakas–CMD	List: Burgos; Dapa; Del Carmen; General Luna; Pilar; San Benito; San Isidro; Santa Monica; Socorro	136,853	622.56 km^{2}	
2nd		Bernadette Sison–Barbers (since 2025); Surigao City	Nacionalista	List: Alegria; Bacuag; Claver; Gigaquit; Mainit; Malimono; Placer; San Francisco; Sison; Surigao City; Tagana-an; Tubod	419,838	1,350.37 km^{2}	

== Historical districts ==
=== Lone district (defunct) ===
- includes the present-day province of Dinagat Islands

Period	Representative
5th Congress; 1961–1965	Reynaldo P. Honrado
6th Congress; 1965–1969	Constantino C. Navarro
7th Congress; 1969–1972	Constantino C. Navarro

=== At-Large district (defunct) ===
- includes the present-day province of Dinagat Islands

Period	Representative
Regular Batasang Pambansa; 1984–1986	Constantino C. Navarro

== See also ==
- Legislative district of Surigao
  - Legislative district of Dinagat Islands
  - Legislative district of Surigao del Sur
