= Bacuag =

Municipality in Surigao del Norte, Philippines

- Municipality
- Municipality of Bacuag
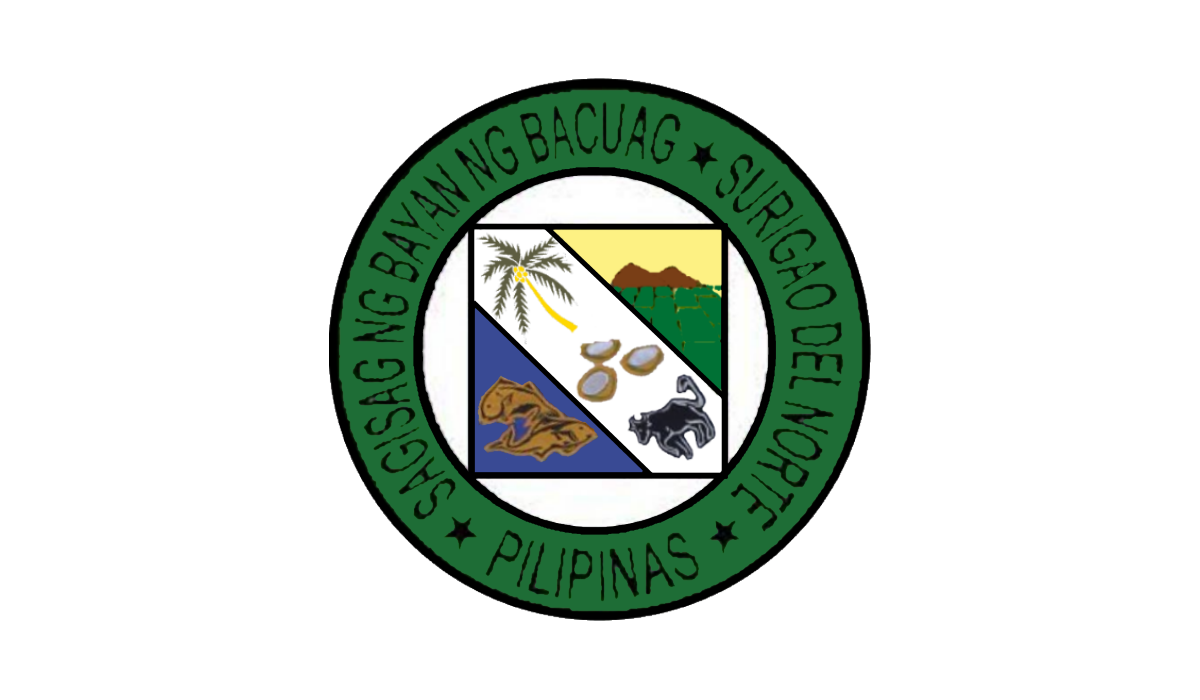
- Flag
- Motto: Bacuag: Where adventure, meets nature.
- Anthem: "Bacuag Hymn"
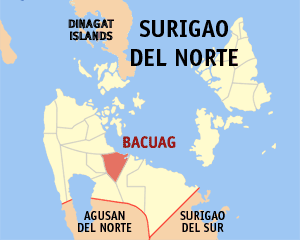
- Map of Surigao del Norte with Bacuag highlighted
- Interactive map of Bacuag
- Location within the Philippines
- Country: Philippines
- Region: Caraga
- Province: Surigao del Norte
- District: 2nd district
- Founded: January 01, 1919
- Barangays: 9 (see Barangays)

Government
  - Type: Sangguniang Bayan
  - Mayor: Tessie Jean C. Nakao (LAKAS)
  - Vice Mayor: Maria Ana I. Santos (NP)
  - Representative: Bernadette S. Barbers (NP)
  - Municipal Council: Members: Myrna G. Abucejo (NP); Edifer U. Chua (LAKAS); Kiziel M. Abucayan (NP); Gilrey A. Lofranco (LAKAS); John Kristoffer O. Orquina (LAKAS); Gil L. Melo (LAKAS); Clemence G. Galindo (LAKAS); Kent M. Tubo (NP)
  - Electorate: 13,152 voters (2025)

Area
  - Total: 95.85 km^{2} (37.01 sq mi)
- Elevation: 51 m (167 ft)
- Highest elevation: 362 m (1,188 ft)
- Lowest elevation: 0 m (0 ft)

Population (17,076)
  - Total: 17,076
  - Density: 178.2/km^{2} (461.4/sq mi)
  - Households: 3,387

Economy
  - Income class: 4th municipal income class
  - Poverty incidence: 16.7% (2023)
  - Revenue: ₱ 116.2 million (2024)
  - Assets: ₱ 328.1 million (2024)
  - Expenditure: ₱ 100.9 million (2024)
  - Liabilities: ₱ 88.95 million (2024)

Service provider
  - Electricity: Surigao del Norte Electric Cooperative (SURNECO)
- Time zone: UTC+8 (PST)
- ZIP code: 8408
- PSGC: 1606702000
- IDD : area code: +63 (0)86
- Native languages: Surigaonon; Agusan; Cebuano; Tagalog
- Website: www.bacuag.gov.ph

Bacuag, officially the Municipality of Bacuag (Surigaonon: Lungsod nan Bacuag; Tagalog: Bayan ng Bacuag), is a municipality in the province of Surigao del Norte, Philippines. According to the 2024 census, it has a population of 17,076 people.

== Geography ==
The town of Bacuag is situated along the north-eastern coast of Mindanao, along the eastern part of the province of Surigao del Norte. It is bounded on the north-western portion by the town of Placer and on the north-eastern portion by Hinatuan Passage. On the south-western side, it is bounded by the town of Gigaquit. On the western side, it is bounded by the town of Tubod and Alegria. Bacuag is 44 kilometres (27 mi) from the provincial capital Surigao City.

Along the south-western and north-eastern portions of the municipality are 44% mountainous areas covering portions of Barangays Cambuayon, Pongtud, Dugsangon and Santo Rosario. The arability and crop suitability of these areas are limited and allowable urban development is of low density. These are best suited for pasture and forestal purposes. A large portion of plain area covers the east and north-eastern part covering portions of Poblacion, Campo, Cabugao, Pautao and parts of Dugsangon and Payapag. Approximately 26% of these 8,256 hectares is suited for intensive agriculture and high density urban development. The remaining 30% is also suited for intensive agriculture but with soil conservation and erosion control measures. Allowable urban development ranges from high to medium density.

Certain areas in the municipality are considered flooding hazard covering 13% of the total municipal area. These are located along and near river and sea banks, located in some portions of Barangays Cabugao, Campo, Payapag, Pongtud, Cambuayon and Poblacion with flood occurrences ranging from slight to moderate.

=== Barangays ===
Bacuag is politically subdivided into 9 barangays. Each barangay consists of puroks while some have sitios.

- Cabugao
- Cambuayon
- Campo
- Dugsangon
- Pautao
- Payapag
- Poblacion
- Pungtod
- Santo Rosario

=== Climate ===
Climate data for Bacuag, Surigao del Norte
Month	Jan	Feb	Mar	Apr	May	Jun	Jul	Aug	Sep	Oct	Nov	Dec	Year
Mean daily maximum °C (°F)	27 (81)	28 (82)	28 (82)	30 (86)	30 (86)	30 (86)	29 (84)	30 (86)	30 (86)	29 (84)	29 (84)	28 (82)	29 (84)
Mean daily minimum °C (°F)	23 (73)	23 (73)	23 (73)	23 (73)	25 (77)	25 (77)	25 (77)	25 (77)	25 (77)	25 (77)	24 (75)	24 (75)	24 (75)
Average precipitation mm (inches)	210 (8.3)	161 (6.3)	123 (4.8)	85 (3.3)	148 (5.8)	186 (7.3)	164 (6.5)	157 (6.2)	141 (5.6)	190 (7.5)	223 (8.8)	200 (7.9)	1,988 (78.3)
Average rainy days	21.0	16.8	18.5	18.2	24.9	27.7	28.4	27.0	26.1	27.6	24.6	22.0	282.8
Source: Meteoblue

== Demographics ==
Population census of Bacuag
Year	Pop.	±% p.a.
1903	2,938	—
1939	6,366	+2.17%
1948	7,062	+1.16%
1960	8,579	+1.63%
1970	9,021	+0.50%
1975	10,318	+2.73%
1980	12,135	+3.30%
1990	11,055	−0.93%
1995	12,309	+2.03%
2000	12,206	−0.18%
2007	13,066	+0.94%
2010	13,211	+0.40%
2015	14,486	+1.77%
2020	14,881	+0.57%
2024	17,076	+3.36%
Source: Philippine Statistics Authority

== Economy ==
Poverty incidence of Bacuag

Source: Philippine Statistics Authority

Since Bacuag is a coastal town, fishing is the primary economic source among local residents.
