= Tubod =

Tubod is the name of two places in the Philippines:

- Tubod, Lanao del Norte
- Tubod, Surigao del Norte
