= Placer, Surigao del Norte =

Municipality in Surigao del Norte, Philippines

Placer
- Municipality
- Municipality of Placer
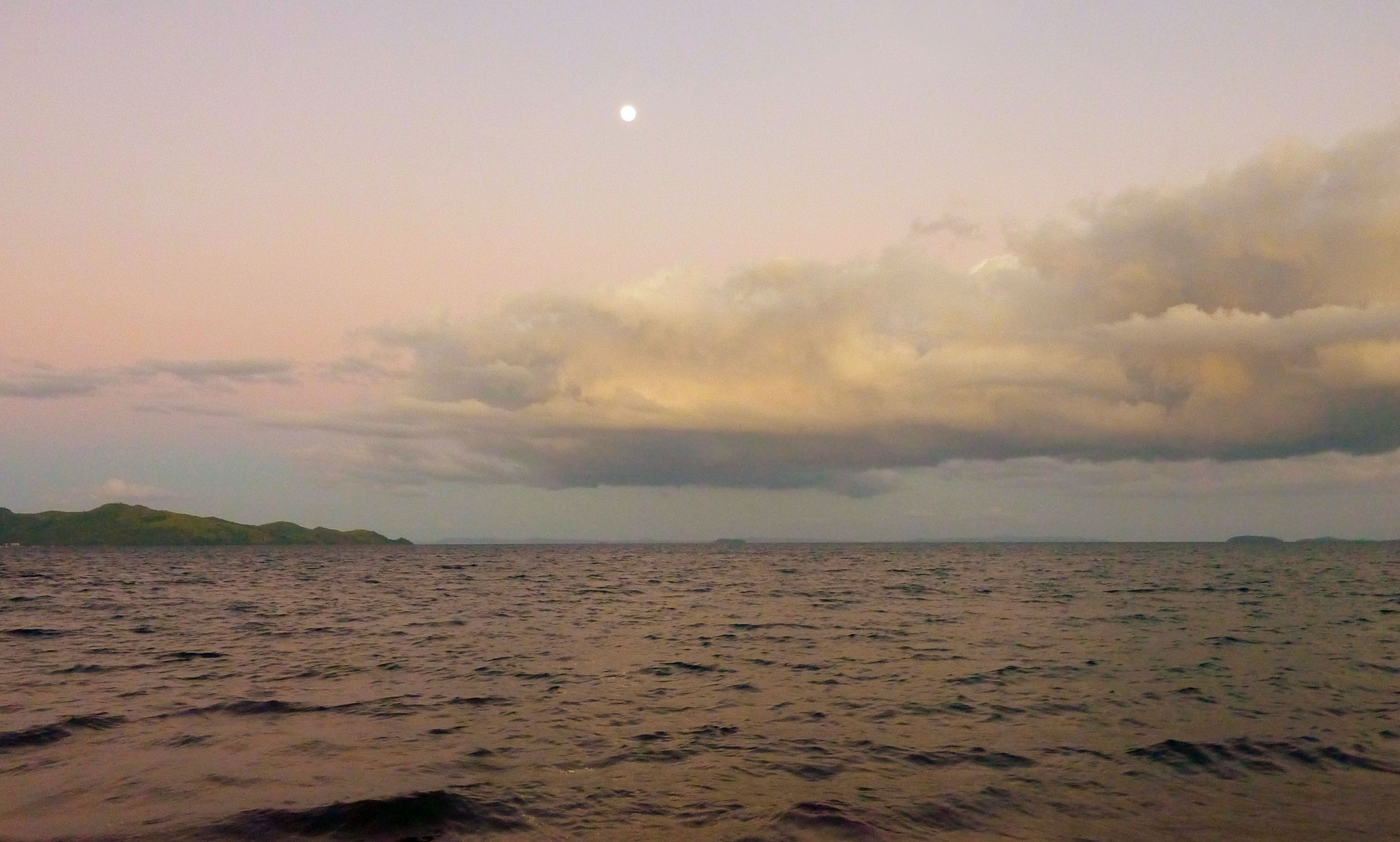
- Cagbantoy Beach

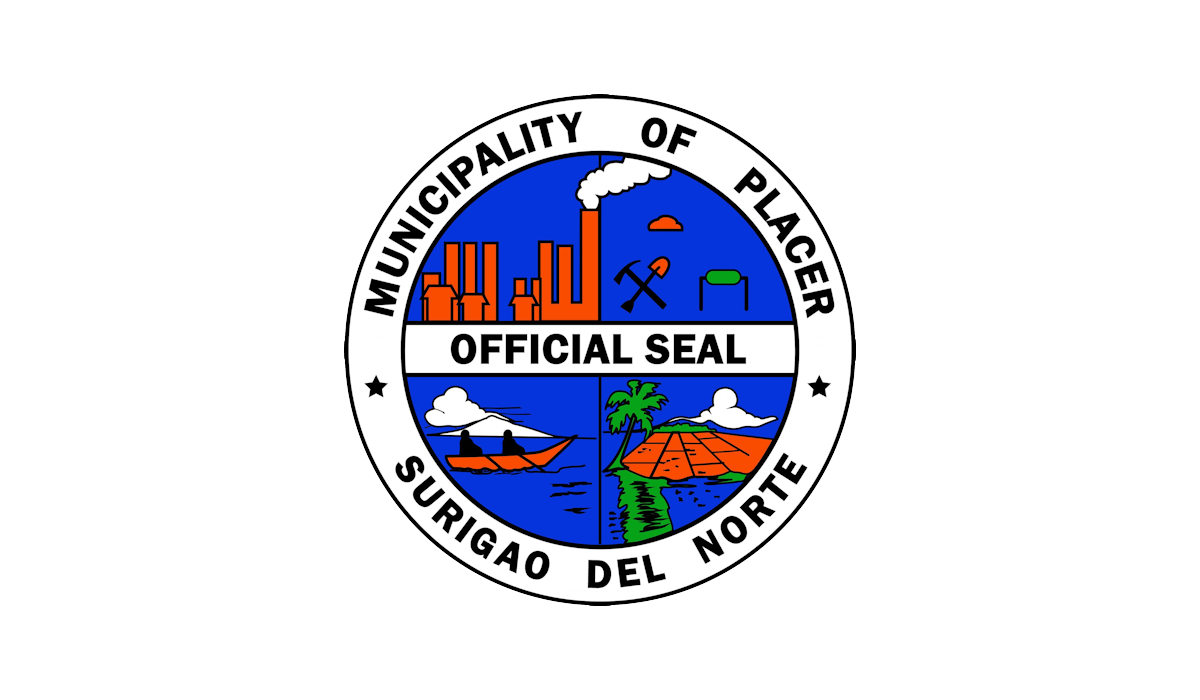
- Flag

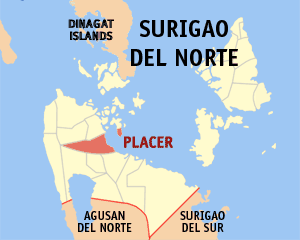
- Map of Surigao del Norte with Placer highlighted
- Interactive map of Placer
- Location within the Philippines
- Coordinates: 9°39′25″N 125°36′06″E
- Country: Philippines
- Region: Caraga
- Province: Surigao del Norte
- District: 2nd district
- Founded: 1850
- Barangays: 20 (see Barangays)

Government
  - Type: Sangguniang Bayan
  - Mayor: Jovymarie C. Villazon (NP)
  - Vice Mayor: Ryan Fel B. Napuli (NP)
  - Representative: Bernadette S. Barbers (NP)
  - Municipal Council: Members: Raul C. Boquilon (NP); Alexander S. Elajas Jr. (NP); Techie C. Sio (NP); Roberto S. Lerio Jr. (IND); Teofilo O. Dapar Jr. (NP); Maggie S. Calonia (LAKAS); Donald P. Villejo (NP); Jenito O. Calimbo (NP)
  - Electorate: 22,183 voters (2025)

Area
  - Total: 61.29 km^{2} (23.66 sq mi)
- Elevation: 42 m (138 ft)
- Highest elevation: 315 m (1,033 ft)
- Lowest elevation: 0 m (0 ft)

Population (2024 census)
  - Total: 30,442
  - Density: 496.7/km^{2} (1,286/sq mi)
  - Households: 6,792

Economy
  - Income class: 3rd municipal income class
  - Poverty incidence: 16.47% (2023)
  - Revenue: ₱ 179.7 million (2024)
  - Assets: ₱ 612.2 million (2024)
  - Expenditure: ₱ 138 million (2024)
  - Liabilities: ₱ 75.7 million (2024)

Service provider
  - Electricity: Surigao del Norte Electric Cooperative (SURNECO)
- Time zone: UTC+8 (PST)
- ZIP code: 8405
- PSGC: 1606717000
- IDD : area code: +63 (0)86
- Native languages: Surigaonon; Agusan; Cebuano; Tagalog

Placer, officially the Municipality of Placer (Surigaonon: Lungsod nan Placer; Tagalog: Bayan ng Placer), is a municipality in the province of Surigao del Norte, Philippines. According to the 2024 census, it has a population of 30,442 people.

== History ==
In 1850, the town was founded by Captain Felipe Custodio and Capitan Luis Patino. It was named "Placer" (Spanish for "pleasure" or "delight") by Custodio in reference to the happiness derived from local gold mining, as well as the abundant fish and rice harvests. In 1860, this name was officially approved.

In 1930, the municipality lost some of its territory when the Municipality of Mainit was formed, and again in 1947, when the Municipality of Tagana-an was established.

=== World War II ===
After the Japanese obtained the surrender of American and Filipino troops on Mindanao in May and June 1942, Placer, along with much of Mindanao, remained free of Japanese occupation. In late September 1943, Japanese troops landed and occupied Placer. Their goals seemed to be to fill drums with oil from a storage tank there for their use and to search for lumber. About 300 to 400 Japanese troops were in town. Some began moving south toward Claver. On October 10, guerrillas under American leadership attacked with 135 men from both the north and south to dislodge the Japanese from Placer. This attack failed, leaving the town in Japanese hands.

== Geography ==
Placer is in the northeast of Mindanao Island, facing the Hinatuan Passage to the east. Its territory includes the small islands of Tinago, Banga, and Mahaba, as well as half of Masapelid Island where barangays Ellaperal, Lakandula, and Sani-sani are located.

Its topography consists of low rising hills that are interspersed by plains.

=== Barangays ===
Placer is politically subdivided into 20 barangays. Each barangay consists of puroks while some have sitios.

In 1956, the sitios of Santa Cruz, Anislagan, Alangalang, Soyoc, and Pananay-an were converted into barrios, while barrio Macalaya was divided into Upper and Lower Macalaya.

- Amoslog
- Anislagan
- Bad-as (contains the intersection of the Pan-Philippine Highway (or National Highway) & the Surigao-Davao Coastal Road)
- Boyongan
- Bugas-bugas
- Central (Poblacion)
- Ellaperal (Nonok)
- Ipil (Poblacion)
- Lakandula
- Mabini
- Macalaya
- Magsaysay (Poblacion)
- Magupange
- Pananay-an
- Panhutongan
- San Isidro
- Sani-sani
- Santa Cruz
- Suyoc
- Tagbongabong

=== Climate ===
Climate data for Placer, Surigao del Norte
Month	Jan	Feb	Mar	Apr	May	Jun	Jul	Aug	Sep	Oct	Nov	Dec	Year
Mean daily maximum °C (°F)	27 (81)	27 (81)	28 (82)	29 (84)	30 (86)	29 (84)	29 (84)	29 (84)	29 (84)	29 (84)	29 (84)	28 (82)	29 (83)
Mean daily minimum °C (°F)	23 (73)	23 (73)	23 (73)	23 (73)	25 (77)	25 (77)	25 (77)	25 (77)	25 (77)	25 (77)	24 (75)	24 (75)	24 (75)
Average precipitation mm (inches)	210 (8.3)	161 (6.3)	123 (4.8)	85 (3.3)	148 (5.8)	186 (7.3)	164 (6.5)	157 (6.2)	141 (5.6)	190 (7.5)	223 (8.8)	200 (7.9)	1,988 (78.3)
Average rainy days	21.0	16.8	18.5	18.2	24.9	27.7	28.4	27.0	26.1	27.6	24.6	22.0	282.8
Source: Meteoblue (modeled/calculated data, not measured locally)

== Demographics ==
Population census of Placer

Year	Pop.	±% p.a.
1903	2,791	—
1918	12,116	+10.28%
1939	14,443	+0.84%
1948	9,330	−4.74%
1960	10,849	+1.26%
1970	11,673	+0.73%
1975	12,931	+2.07%
1980	14,470	+2.27%

Year	Pop.	±% p.a.
1990	18,478	+2.48%
1995	20,712	+2.16%
2000	21,542	+0.85%
2007	22,743	+0.75%
2010	24,600	+2.90%
2015	27,094	+1.86%
2020	29,616	+1.89%
2024	30,442	+0.66%

Source: Philippine Statistics Authority

== Economy ==
Poverty incidence of Placer (%)

Source: Philippine Statistics Authority
