= Mainit =

Municipality in Surigao del Norte, Philippines

- Municipality
- Municipality of Mainit
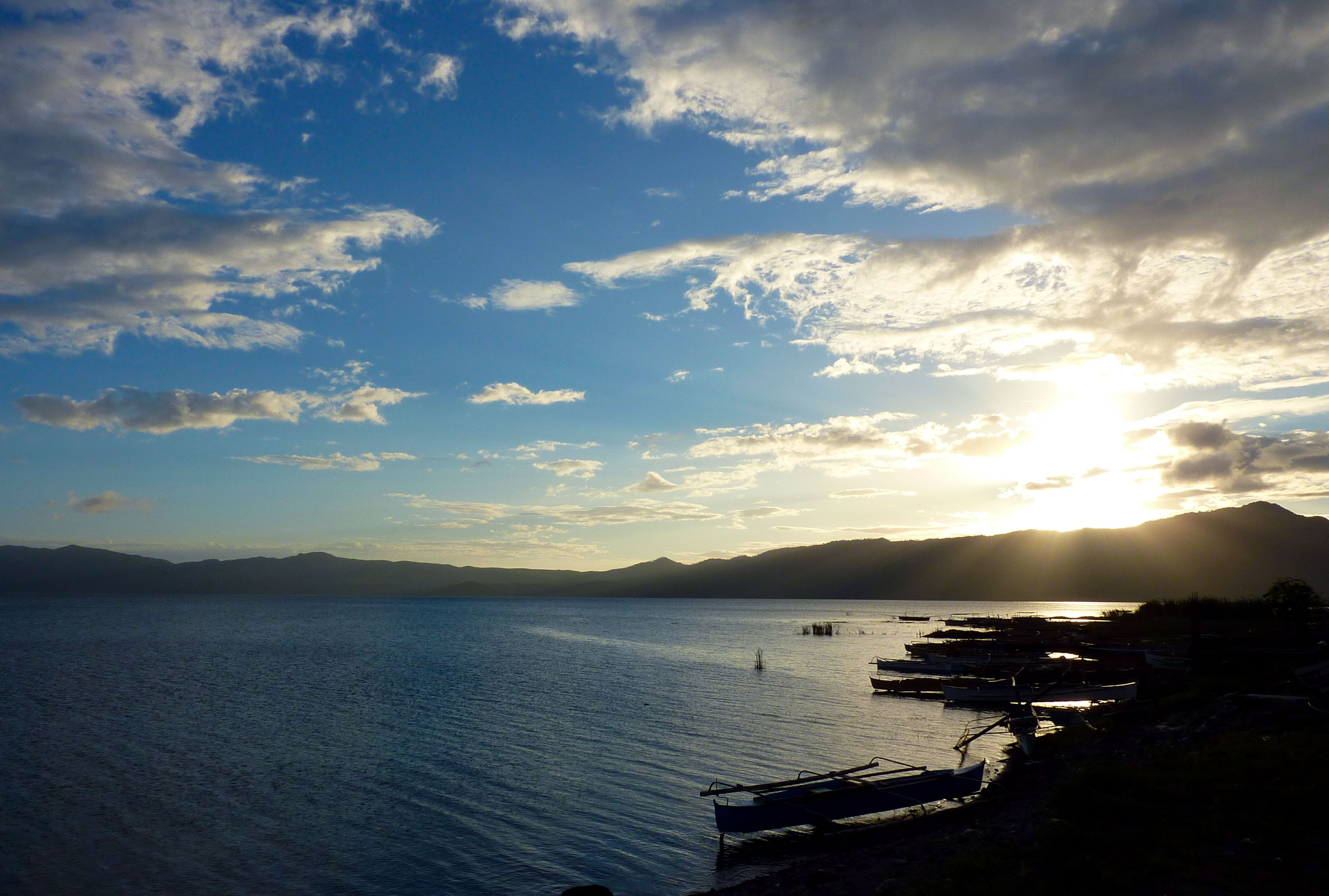
- Sunset over Lake Mainit

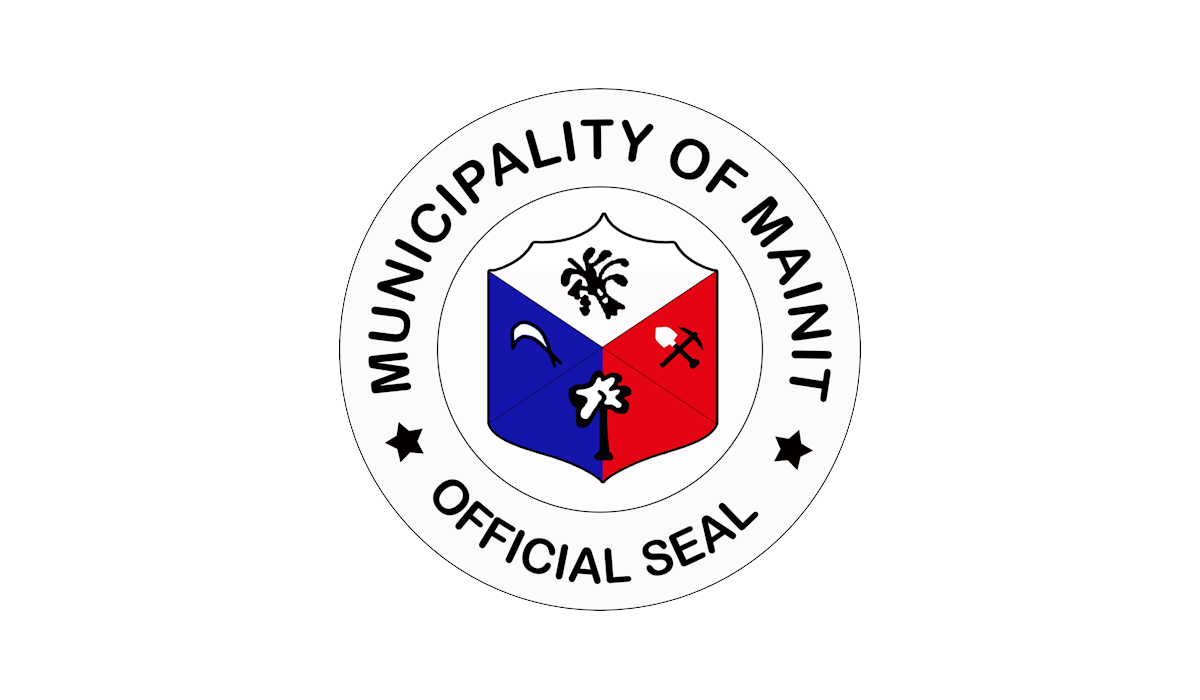
- Flag Seal

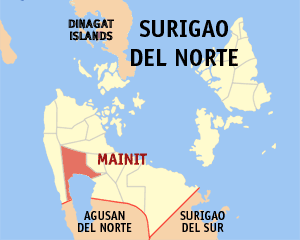
- Map of Surigao del Norte with Mainit highlighted
- Interactive map of Mainit
- Location within the Philippines
- Coordinates: 9°32′13″N 125°31′23″E
- Country: Philippines
- Region: Caraga
- Province: Surigao del Norte
- District: 2nd district
- Founded: December 27, 1930
- Barangays: 21 (see Barangays)

Government
  - Type: Sangguniang Bayan
  - Mayor: Ramon B. Mondano (NP)
  - Vice Mayor: Crisanta O. Mondano (NP)
  - Representative: Bernadette S. Barbers (NP)
  - Municipal Council: Members: Felipe E. Garrido (LAKAS); Chino S. Mosende (NP); Caloy L. Beltran (NP); Bernabe P. Nalam (NP); Helena B. Naldoza (LAKAS); Jessnar C. Mosende (LAKAS); Edgar S. Canangca-an (NP); Dexter M. Cabahug (NP)
  - Electorate: 21,282 voters (2025)

Area
  - Total: 107.76 km^{2} (41.61 sq mi)
- Elevation: 50 m (160 ft)
- Highest elevation: 425 m (1,394 ft)
- Lowest elevation: 0 m (0 ft)

Population (2024 census)
  - Total: 29,205
  - Density: 271.02/km^{2} (701.94/sq mi)
  - Households: 6,492

Economy
  - Income class: 3rd municipal income class
  - Poverty incidence: 14.94% (2023)
  - Revenue: ₱ 177.7 million (2024)
  - Assets: ₱ 594.2 million (2024)
  - Expenditure: ₱ 153.3 million (2024)
  - Liabilities: ₱ 156.3 million (2024)

Service provider
  - Electricity: Surigao del Norte Electric Cooperative (SURNECO)
- Time zone: UTC+8 (PST)
- ZIP code: 8407
- PSGC: 1606714000
- IDD : area code: +63 (0)86
- Native languages: Surigaonon; Agusan; Cebuano; Mamanwa; Tagalog
- Website: www.mainit.gov.ph

Mainit, officially the Municipality of Mainit (Surigaonon: Lungsod nan Mainit; Cebuano: Lungsod sa Mainit; Tagalog: Bayan ng Mainit), is a municipality in the province of Surigao del Norte, Philippines. According to the 2024 census, it has a population of 29,205 people.

It is situated on the north shore of Lake Mainit in the north-eastern part of Mindanao. The word "mainit" literally means "hot". The other local term for "mainit" is "mapaso." Mainit is home to a hot spring, the Mapaso Wellness Resort frequented by locals and visitors from nearby towns and provinces. It is regarded that Mainit got its name from this hot sulfuric spring.

== History ==
The first inhabitants of Mainit settled near Lake Mainit in what is now barangay San Isidro (formerly called "Daang Lungsod" or "Old Town"). It was believed that the constant harassment of pirates forced the original settlers to move to the present town site.

Mainit was established as a Barrio in 1904 under the Municipality of Placer. In 1906, it was transferred under the jurisdiction and reclassified as a Municipality of the Province of Agusan del Norte (owing to its proximity to the border of Surigao del Norte and Agusan del Norte). However, after six months, Mainit was returned to the Province of Surigao del Norte and its status was reverted to being a barangay of Placer. Mainit was finally reclassified into a separate municipality in Jan. 1, 1931 by virtue of Executive Order 290 dated December 27, 1930, signed by Governor-General Dwight F. Davis.

Two of Mainit's barangays were made into full-fledged municipalities: Tubod in 1958 and Alegria in 1968. Mainit currently has 21 Barangays.

Mainit got its name from the hot sulfuric spring which flows to the river the “Mapaso Hot Spring”. Mapaso literally is “hot”.

== Geography ==
=== Barangays ===
Mainit is politically subdivided into 21 Barangays. Each barangay consists of puroks while some have sitios.

In 1956, the sitios of Magpayang and Siana were elevated into full-fledged Barangays.

- Binga
- Bobona-on
- Cantugas
- Dayano
- Mabini
- Magpayang
- Magsaysay (Poblacion)
- Mansayao
- Marayag
- Matin-ao
- Paco
- Quezon (Poblacion)
- Roxas
- San Francisco
- San Isidro
- San Jose
- Siana
- Silop
- Tagbuyawan
- Tapi-an
- Tolingon

=== Climate ===
Climate data for Mainit, Surigao del Norte
Month	Jan	Feb	Mar	Apr	May	Jun	Jul	Aug	Sep	Oct	Nov	Dec	Year
Mean daily maximum °C (°F)	27 (81)	27 (81)	28 (82)	29 (84)	30 (86)	29 (84)	29 (84)	29 (84)	29 (84)	29 (84)	28 (82)	28 (82)	29 (83)
Mean daily minimum °C (°F)	23 (73)	23 (73)	23 (73)	23 (73)	24 (75)	25 (77)	24 (75)	25 (77)	24 (75)	24 (75)	24 (75)	24 (75)	24 (75)
Average precipitation mm (inches)	210 (8.3)	161 (6.3)	123 (4.8)	85 (3.3)	148 (5.8)	186 (7.3)	164 (6.5)	157 (6.2)	141 (5.6)	190 (7.5)	223 (8.8)	200 (7.9)	1,988 (78.3)
Average rainy days	21.0	16.8	18.5	18.2	24.9	27.7	28.4	27.0	26.1	27.6	24.6	22.0	282.8
Source: Meteoblue

== Demographics ==
Population census of Mainit
Year	Pop.	±% p.a.
1903	1,588	—
1939	13,951	+6.22%
1948	17,681	+2.67%
1960	18,542	+0.40%
1970	14,759	−2.25%
1975	17,064	+2.95%
1980	18,078	+1.16%
1990	21,505	+1.75%
1995	21,780	+0.24%
2000	23,417	+1.57%
2007	23,952	+0.31%
2010	25,596	+2.45%
2015	26,741	+0.84%
2020	28,019	+0.99%
2024	29,205	+1.00%
Source: Philippine Statistics Authority

The Surigaonon language is the common local language, while Cebuano, Filipino, and English are also spoken.

== Economy ==
Poverty incidence of Mainit (%)

Source: Philippine Statistics Authority

== Notable people ==
- Petra Macliing, anti-Chico dam activist

== See also ==
- Lake Mainit Development Alliance
