= Ace Barbers =

Filipino politician (born 1969)

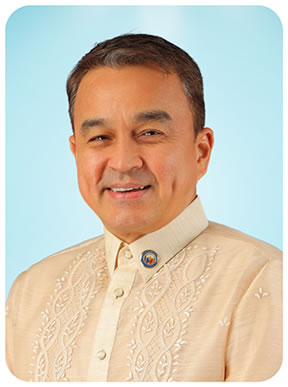
- Barbers during the 19th Congress

Chair of the House Committee on Dangerous Drugs
- In office July 25, 2016 – June 30, 2025
- Preceded by: Vicente Belmonte Jr.

Member of the Philippine House of Representatives Surigao del Norte's 2nd congressional district
- In office June 30, 2016 – June 30, 2025
- Preceded by: Guillermo Romarate
- Succeeded by: Bernadette Barbers
- In office June 30, 1998 – June 30, 2007
- Preceded by: Robert Barbers
- Succeeded by: Guillermo Romarate

Governor of Surigao del Norte
- In office June 30, 2007 – June 30, 2010
- Vice Governor: Noel Catre
- Preceded by: Robert Lyndon Barbers
- Succeeded by: Sol Matugas

Spokesperson of the Nacionalista Party
- Incumbent
- Assumed office 2012

Personal details
- Born: Robert Ace Smith Barbers; May 31, 1969 (age 57) Manila, Philippines
- Party: Nacionalista (2009–present)
- Other political affiliations: Lakas (1997–2009)
- Spouse: Bernadette Sison
- Relations: Robert Lyndon Barbers (brother)
- Children: Robert King Barbers; Robert Jack Barbers; Robert Ace Barbers, Jr. Robert Spade Barbers
- Education: De La Salle University (AB); University of the Philippines (MPA)
- Profession: Politician

Robert Ace Smith Barbers (usually stylized as Robert "Ace" Barbers), (born May 31, 1969) or also known simply as Ace Barbers, is a Filipino politician. The son of former senator Robert Barbers, he served as the representative of the second district of Surigao del Norte from 1998 to 2007 and again from 2016 to 2025. He also served as provincial governor (2007–2010).

== Early and personal life ==
Barbers was born on May 31, 1969, in Manila, Philippines. He is the second of four siblings by Robert Barbers and Virginia Smith.

Barbers was a graduate of Bachelor of Arts in political science, Minor in Economics at the De La Salle University (1987–1990), and became a holder of Master's degree in Public Administration and Governance at the University of the Philippines (2000–2003).

Barbers has been married to Bernadette Sison since 1991; they have four sons.

=== Family's political involvement ===
Barbers came from a political clan in Surigao del Norte where his father was a Secretary of the Interior and Local Government and served in the Congress until 2004, and died a year later. His brother, Robert Lyndon, has been serving as provincial governor; while another, Robert Dean, served as a councilor in Makati and held cabinet positions during the Arroyo administration, being named officer-in-charge of the Department of Tourism and general manager and CEO of the Philippine Tourism Authority.

The family lost their political control in 2010 when the Matugases won the key positions in the province. While Ace lost in his re-election bid for provincial governor, his two brothers were likewise defeated: Lyndon, who ran for Surigao City mayor; and Dean, for Makati 1st district representative. At the time of Ace's re-election as congressman in 2022, Lyndon only regained his seat.

For the 2025 elections, Lyndon filed his candidacy for second gubernatorial term. Meanwhile, Ace's wife, Bernadette, is seeking to succeed her husband as district representative.

== Political career ==
=== As district representative, first time (1998–2007) ===
Barbers first served as the representative of the 2nd district of Surigao del Norte (the position previously held by his father) from 1998 to 2007. During his term, he belonged to the Lakas–NUCD of former president Fidel V. Ramos, which later became the ruling Lakas party of the administration of Gloria Macapagal–Arroyo. During the House speakership of Jose de Venecia Jr., Barbers was the chairperson of the accounts committee until his resignation in 2005, reportedly to focus on his post-graduate studies at the University of the Philippines.

It was during Barbers' term when he and his father, then-senator Robert, authored the Comprehensive Drugs Bill of 2002. He was among those who voted against president Arroyo's controversial proposal to increase the value-added tax from 10–12 percent.

Barbers was also known being a member of the so-called "Spice Boys" who called for the impeachment of then-president Joseph Estrada. On the other hand, he signed the unsuccessful impeachment complaint against Arroyo.

=== As provincial governor (2007–2010), later attempts in politics ===
Barbers won for provincial governor of Surigao del Norte in 2007, but lost to Sol Forcadilla Matugas, retired regional director of the Department of Education – Caraga, in his re-election bid in 2010.

Barbers has been a member of the Nacionalista Party since 2013, at that time he lost to incumbent second district representative Guillermo Romarate Jr., who later finished his third and last term.

=== As district representative, second time (since 2016) ===
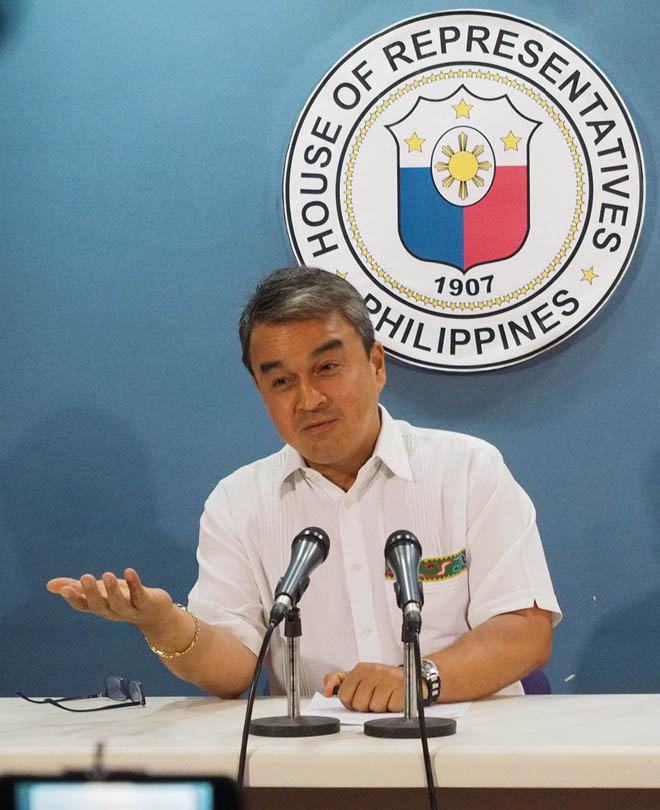
Barbers during press briefing in 2017

Barbers eventually regained the seat in 2016; he is currently serving his third consecutive term—the sixth overall. He has been the chairperson of the House Committee on Dangerous Drugs.

In his tenure in the lower house, Barbers has been supporting charter change, particularly reforms on economic provisions.

Barbers, once a long-time ally of the Dutertes, was among those who supported the presidency of Rodrigo Duterte, particularly the administration's drug war and anti-criminality stance; and even sought the revival of the death penalty for drug-related offenses. Meanwhile in 2019, his local party Abante Surigao formed an alliance with Hugpong ng Pagbabago of then Davao City mayor Sara Duterte, whose successful candidacy for vice president was endorsed by him in 2022.

However in late 2024, Barbers led the House Quad Committee Investigation, an inquiry on issues involving the Philippine Offshore Gaming Operators (POGOs) and other allegations during the Duterte administration. He also led another investigation on the Office of the Vice President.

Aside from the POGO issue, Barbers is also critical of China in other issues; this includes China's enforcement of its own claims in the South China Sea dispute, its opposition to the Philippines building its military capability to counter China and potential Chinese espionage in the Philippines. He allegedly has been a target of a troll farm sponsored by China.

== Controversies ==
Barbers was among more than a hundred legislators mentioned in the 2013 special audit report on the release of the Priority Development Assistance Fund to non-governmental organizations during his governorship, from 2007 to 2009.

In October 2016, an ethics complaint was filed against Barbers by his political rival, Surigao del Sur 1st district representative Prospero Pichay Jr., for his "disorderly behavior" in relation to a confrontation when the two fought with each other after a heated exchange during a discussion on charter change in the meeting of the House constitutional amendments panel.

The following month, Barbers filed an ethics complaint against Pichay, whom he accused of theft and graft, due to the alleged illegal mining activities of the latter's company.

In November 2024, the Philippine Drug Enforcement Agency Regional Office XIII denounced fake news linking Barbers to a drug syndicate in connection to a law enforcement operation in Surigao City. On December 6, 2024, Anonymous Surigao posted a spliced video which falsely portrayed Barbers "admitting" he is a drug lord.
