= Surigao del Norte's 2nd congressional district =

Legislative district of the Philippines

- Constituency for the House of Representatives of the Philippines
- Map
- Location of Surigao del Norte within the Philippines
- Province: Surigao del Norte
- Region: Caraga
- Population: 368,501 (2015)
- Electorate: 271,507 (2019)
- Major settlements: 12 LGUs: Cities; Surigao City; Municipalities; Alegria; Bacuag; Claver; Gigaquit; Mainit; Malimono; Placer; San Francisco; Sison; Tagana-an; Tubod
- Area: 1,350.37 km^{2} (521.38 sq mi)

Current constituency
- Created: 1987
- Representative: Bernadette Barbers
- Political party: Nacionalista
- Congressional bloc: Majority

Surigao del Norte's 2nd congressional district is one of the two congressional districts of the Philippines in the province of Surigao del Norte. It has been represented in the House of Representatives since 1987. The district comprises all twelve local government units in mainland Surigao del Norte including its capital Surigao City. Its municipalities are Alegria, Bacuag, Claver, Gigaquit, Mainit, Malimono, Placer, San Francisco, Sison, Tagana-an and Tubod. It is currently represented in the 20th Congress by Bernadette Barbers of the Nacionalista Party (NP).

== Representation history ==
#	Image	Member	Term of office		Congress	Party	Electoral history	Constituent LGUs
#	Image	Member	Start	End	Congress	Party	Electoral history	Constituent LGUs
=== Surigao del Norte's 2nd district for the House of Representatives of the Philippines ===
District created February 2, 1987 from Surigao del Norte's at-large district.
1		Constantino Navarro Sr.	June 30, 1987	June 30, 1992	8th	KBL	Elected in 1987.	1987–present Alegria, Bacuag, Claver, Gigaquit, Mainit, Malimono, Placer, San Francisco, Sison, Surigao City, Tagana-an, Tubod
2		Robert Barbers	June 30, 1992	April 15, 1996	9th	Lakas	Elected in 1992.	1987–present Alegria, Bacuag, Claver, Gigaquit, Mainit, Malimono, Placer, San Francisco, Sison, Surigao City, Tagana-an, Tubod
2		Robert Barbers	June 30, 1992	April 15, 1996	10th	Lakas	Re-elected in 1995. Resigned on appointment as Secretary of the Interior and Local Government.	1987–present Alegria, Bacuag, Claver, Gigaquit, Mainit, Malimono, Placer, San Francisco, Sison, Surigao City, Tagana-an, Tubod
—	vacant		April 15, 1996	June 30, 1998	–	No special election held to fill vacancy.		1987–present Alegria, Bacuag, Claver, Gigaquit, Mainit, Malimono, Placer, San Francisco, Sison, Surigao City, Tagana-an, Tubod
3		Ace Barbers	June 30, 1998	June 30, 2007	11th	Lakas	Elected in 1998.	1987–present Alegria, Bacuag, Claver, Gigaquit, Mainit, Malimono, Placer, San Francisco, Sison, Surigao City, Tagana-an, Tubod
3		Ace Barbers	June 30, 1998	June 30, 2007	12th	Lakas	Re-elected in 2001.	1987–present Alegria, Bacuag, Claver, Gigaquit, Mainit, Malimono, Placer, San Francisco, Sison, Surigao City, Tagana-an, Tubod
3		Ace Barbers	June 30, 1998	June 30, 2007	13th	Lakas	Re-elected in 2004.	1987–present Alegria, Bacuag, Claver, Gigaquit, Mainit, Malimono, Placer, San Francisco, Sison, Surigao City, Tagana-an, Tubod
4		Guillermo A. Romarate Jr.	June 30, 2007	June 30, 2016	14th	Lakas	Elected in 2007.	1987–present Alegria, Bacuag, Claver, Gigaquit, Mainit, Malimono, Placer, San Francisco, Sison, Surigao City, Tagana-an, Tubod
4		Guillermo A. Romarate Jr.	June 30, 2007	June 30, 2016	15th	Liberal	Re-elected in 2010.	1987–present Alegria, Bacuag, Claver, Gigaquit, Mainit, Malimono, Placer, San Francisco, Sison, Surigao City, Tagana-an, Tubod
4		Guillermo A. Romarate Jr.	June 30, 2007	June 30, 2016	16th	Liberal	Re-elected in 2013.	1987–present Alegria, Bacuag, Claver, Gigaquit, Mainit, Malimono, Placer, San Francisco, Sison, Surigao City, Tagana-an, Tubod
(3)		Ace Barbers	June 30, 2016	June 30, 2025	17th	Nacionalista	Elected in 2016.	1987–present Alegria, Bacuag, Claver, Gigaquit, Mainit, Malimono, Placer, San Francisco, Sison, Surigao City, Tagana-an, Tubod
(3)		Ace Barbers	June 30, 2016	June 30, 2025	18th	Nacionalista	Re-elected in 2019.	1987–present Alegria, Bacuag, Claver, Gigaquit, Mainit, Malimono, Placer, San Francisco, Sison, Surigao City, Tagana-an, Tubod
(3)		Ace Barbers	June 30, 2016	June 30, 2025	19th	Nacionalista	Re-elected in 2022.	1987–present Alegria, Bacuag, Claver, Gigaquit, Mainit, Malimono, Placer, San Francisco, Sison, Surigao City, Tagana-an, Tubod
5		Bernadette Barbers	June 30, 2025	Incumbent	20th	Nacionalista	Elected in 2025.	1987–present Alegria, Bacuag, Claver, Gigaquit, Mainit, Malimono, Placer, San Francisco, Sison, Surigao City, Tagana-an, Tubod

== Election results ==
=== 2025 ===
2025 Philippine House of Representatives elections
Party	Candidate	Votes	%
Nacionalista	Bernadette Barbers	124,526	54.10%
Padajon Surigao Party	Jun Jun Egay	99,856	43.39%
Independent	Antonio Mainit Jr.	2,441	1.06%
Independent	Rodel Villanueva	1,699	0.74%
Independent	Gil Masuhay	1,637	0.71%
Total votes		230,159	100%
Nacionalista hold			

=== 2022 ===
2022 Philippine House of Representatives elections
Party	Candidate	Votes	%
Nacionalista	Ace Barbers	162,489	71.56%
PDP–Laban	Lolong Larong	64,592	28.44%
Total votes		227,081	100%
Nacionalista hold			

=== 2019 ===
2019 Philippine House of Representatives elections
Party	Candidate	Votes	%
Nacionalista	Ace Barbers	112,176	53.80%
PDP–Laban	Sol Matugas	96,059	46.07%
Independent	Roldan Rafols	274	0.13%
Total votes		208,509	100%
Nacionalista hold			

=== 2016 ===
2019 Philippine House of Representatives elections
Party	Candidate	Votes	%
Nacionalista	Ace Barbers	104,877	60.86%
Liberal	Mary Ann Lucille Sering	67,456	39.14%
Total votes		172,333	100%
Nacionalista gain from Liberal			

== See also ==
- Legislative districts of Surigao del Norte
