= Bernadette Barbers =

Filipino politician (born 1970)

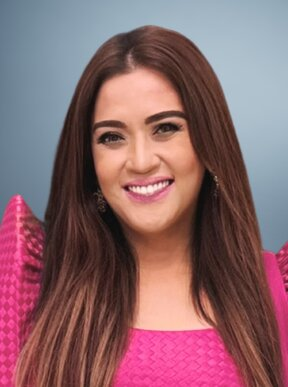
- Official portrait, 2025

Member of Philippine House of Representatives for Surigao del Norte's 2nd district
- Incumbent
- Assumed office June 30, 2025
- Preceded by: Ace Barbers

Personal details
- Born: Bernadette Sison; September 16, 1970 (age 56) Roxas, Oriental Mindoro, Philippines
- Party: Nacionalista (2025–present)
- Spouse: Ace Barbers (m. 1991)
- Children: 4
- Nickname: Badette

Bernadette Sison Barbers (born September 16, 1970) is a Filipino entrepreneur and politician who has served as the representative for Surigao del Norte's 2nd congressional district in the Philippine House of Representatives since 2025. A member of the Nacionalista Party, she is the wife of former representative Ace Barbers.

== House of Representatives ==
=== 2025 election ===
Barbers's husband Ace, the incumbent representative for Surigao del Norte's 2nd congressional district, is term-limited. She was nominated by the Nacionalista Party for the 2025 elections, winning by a margin of nearly 25,000 votes.

=== Tenure ===
Barbers voted to approve the committee report of the House Committee on Justice, which contained the articles of impeachment against Vice President Sara Duterte on May 4, 2026, transmitting it to the plenary for the House's vote on whether to endorse it to the Senate for a trial. She later voted to impeach Duterte on May 11.

=== Committee membership ===
- Committee on Appropriations (Vice Chair)
- Committee on Agriculture and Food
- Committee on Ecology
- Committee on Higher and Technical Education
- Committee on Housing and Urban Development
- Committee on Inter-Parliamentary Relations and Diplomacy
- Committee on Justice
- Committee on Micro, Small and Medium Enterprise Development
- Committee on Mindanao Affairs
- Committee on Natural Resources
- Committee on Public Accounts
- Committee on Public Order and Safety
- Committee on Trade and Industry
- Committee on Ways and Means
- Special Committee on the East ASEAN Growth Area

== Personal life ==
Barbers is married to former Surigao del Norte representative Ace Barbers, with whom she had four children: Robert King, Robert Jack, Robert Ace Jr., and Robert Spade. During her husband's tenure as governor, she served as the de facto first lady of Surigao del Norte.

== Electoral history ==
Electoral history of Bernadette Barbers
| Year | Office | Party | Votes received | | | | Result |
| Year | Office | Party | Total | % | P. | Swing | Result |
|---|---|---|---|---|---|---|---|
| 2025 | Representative (Surigao del Norte–2nd) | Nacionalista | 124,526 | 54.10% | 1st | —N/a | Won |

House of Representatives of the Philippines
| Preceded by Ace Barbers | Member for Surigao del Norte's 2nd district June 30, 2025 – present | Incumbent |
