= Malimono =

Municipality in Surigao del Norte, Philippines

- Municipality
- Municipality of Malimono
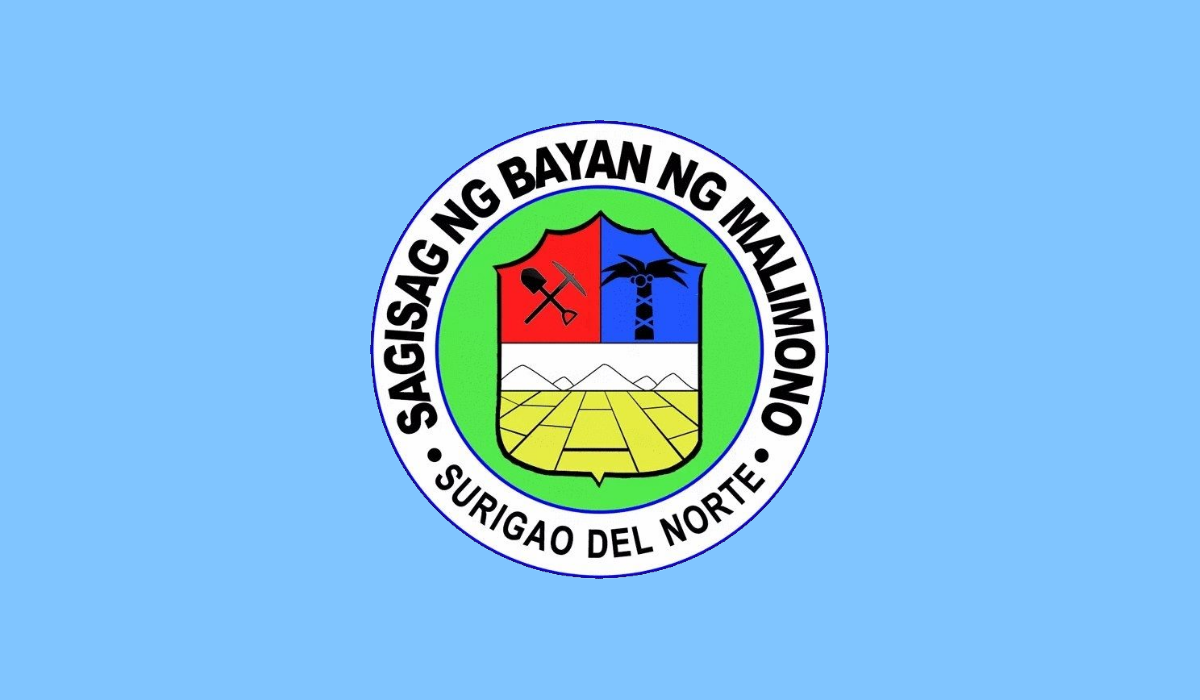
- Flag

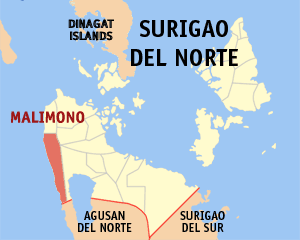
- Map of Surigao del Norte with Malimono highlighted
- Interactive map of Malimono
- Location within the Philippines
- Coordinates: 9°37′06″N 125°24′07″E
- Country: Philippines
- Region: Caraga
- Province: Surigao del Norte
- District: 2nd district
- Barangays: 14 (see Barangays)

Government
  - Type: Sangguniang Bayan
  - Mayor: Arnel S. Amalla (NP)
  - Vice Mayor: Robert T. Senaca (NP)
  - Representative: Bernadette S. Barbers (NP)
  - Municipal Council: Members: Monaliza C. Mantilla (IND); Natividad P. Abraham (LAKAS); Radito M. Galola (LAKAS); Agustino G. Sandigan (NP); Rose Ann L. Tandugon (NP); Joan S. Stohlton (NP); Eulogio S. Ferol III (NP); Reynaldo T. Paño (LAKAS)
  - Electorate: 15,021 voters (2025)

Area
  - Total: 80.13 km^{2} (30.94 sq mi)
- Elevation: 178 m (584 ft)
- Highest elevation: 1,009 m (3,310 ft)
- Lowest elevation: 0 m (0 ft)

Population (2024 census)
  - Total: 19,442
  - Density: 242.6/km^{2} (628.4/sq mi)
  - Households: 4,629

Economy
  - Income class: 4th municipal income class
  - Poverty incidence: 13.29% (2023)
  - Revenue: ₱ 121.7 million (2024)
  - Assets: ₱ 435.4 million (2024)
  - Expenditure: ₱ 38.46 million (2024)
  - Liabilities: ₱ 120.7 million (2024)

Service provider
  - Electricity: Surigao del Norte Electric Cooperative (SURNECO)
- Time zone: UTC+8 (PST)
- ZIP code: 8402
- PSGC: 1606715000
- IDD : area code: +63 (0)86
- Native languages: Surigaonon; Agusan; Cebuano; Tagalog
- Website: www.malimono.gov.ph

Malimono, officially the Municipality of Malimono (Surigaonon: Lungsod nan Malimono; Cebuano: Lungsod sa Malimono; Tagalog: Bayan ng Malimono), is a municipality in the province of Surigao del Norte, Philippines. According to the 2024 census, it has a population of 19,442 people.

== Geography ==
=== Barangays ===
Malimono is politically subdivided into 14 barangays. Each barangay consists of puroks while some have sitios.

- Bunyasan
- Cagtinae
- Can-aga
- Cansayong
- Cantapoy
- Cayawan
- Doro (Binocaran)
- Hanagdong
- Karihatag
- Masgad
- Pili
- San Isidro (Poblacion)
- Tinago
- Villariza

=== Climate ===
Climate data for Malimono, Surigao del Norte
Month	Jan	Feb	Mar	Apr	May	Jun	Jul	Aug	Sep	Oct	Nov	Dec	Year
Mean daily maximum °C (°F)	27 (81)	27 (81)	28 (82)	30 (86)	30 (86)	29 (84)	29 (84)	30 (86)	30 (86)	29 (84)	29 (84)	28 (82)	29 (84)
Mean daily minimum °C (°F)	23 (73)	23 (73)	23 (73)	23 (73)	25 (77)	25 (77)	25 (77)	25 (77)	25 (77)	25 (77)	24 (75)	24 (75)	24 (75)
Average precipitation mm (inches)	210 (8.3)	161 (6.3)	123 (4.8)	85 (3.3)	148 (5.8)	186 (7.3)	164 (6.5)	157 (6.2)	141 (5.6)	190 (7.5)	223 (8.8)	200 (7.9)	1,988 (78.3)
Average rainy days	21.0	16.8	18.5	18.2	24.9	27.7	28.4	27.0	26.1	27.6	24.6	22.0	282.8
Source: Meteoblue

== Demographics ==
Population census of Malimono
Year	Pop.	±% p.a.
1960	6,537	—
1970	9,412	+3.71%
1975	10,074	+1.37%
1980	12,109	+3.75%
1990	16,208	+2.96%
1995	14,191	−2.46%
2000	14,597	+0.61%
2007	16,883	+2.03%
2010	18,316	+3.01%
2015	18,054	−0.27%
2020	18,852	+0.91%
2024	19,442	+0.74%
Source: Philippine Statistics Authority

== Economy ==
Poverty incidence of Malimono (%)

Source: Philippine Statistics Authority
