= Alegria, Surigao del Norte =

Municipality in Surigao del Norte, Philippines

Alegria
- Municipality
- Municipality of Alegria
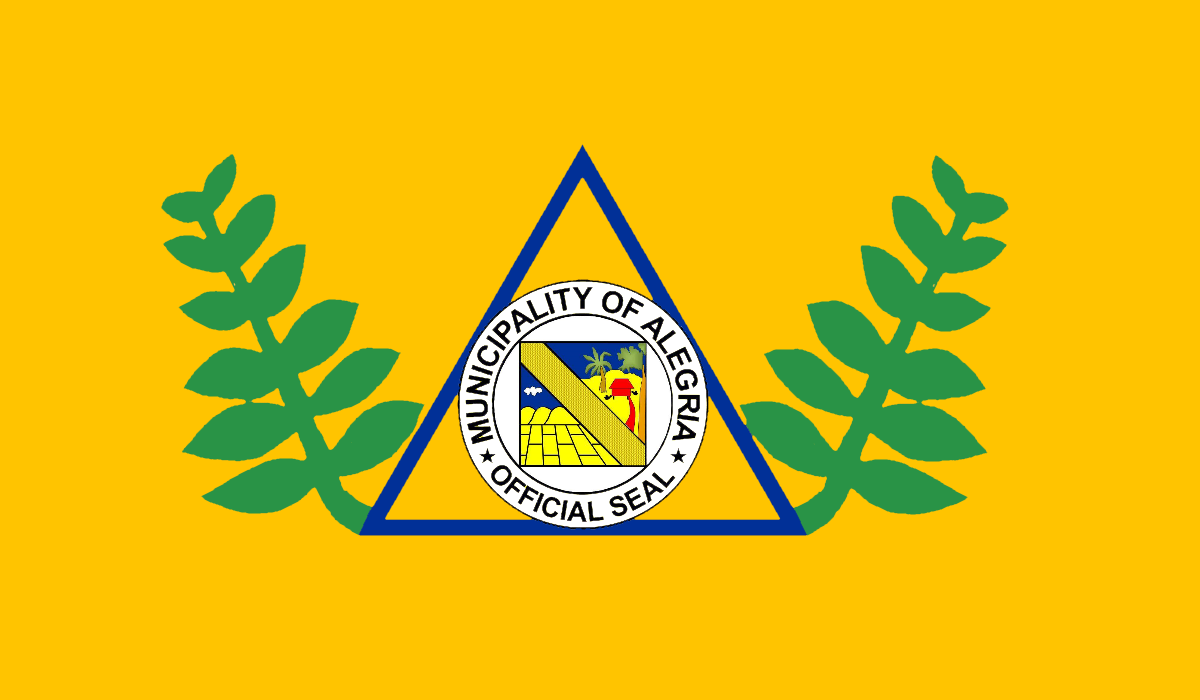
- Flag Seal
- Interactive map of Alegria
- Location within the Philippines
- Coordinates: 9°28′00″N 125°34′36″E
- Country: Philippines
- Region: Caraga
- Province: Surigao del Norte
- District: 2nd district
- Barangays: 12 (see Barangays)

Government
  - Type: Sangguniang Bayan
  - Mayor: Dominador G. Esma Jr. (NP)
  - Vice Mayor: Rene G. Esma (NP)
  - Representative: Bernadette S. Barbers (NP)
  - Municipal Council: Members: Narciso I. Caliao Jr. (NP); Robert Q. Rafael (NP); Rizaldy A. Esma (NP); Nimfa N. Sagaral (NP); Almasur G. Opalia (NP); Reynaldo Ranay (NP); Estelita Galido (NP); Alexander Micompal (NP)
  - Electorate: 13,621 voters (2025)

Area
  - Total: 65.28 km^{2} (25.20 sq mi)
- Elevation: 11 m (36 ft)
- Highest elevation: 183 m (600 ft)
- Lowest elevation: 0 m (0 ft)

Population (2024 census)
  - Total: 17,846
  - Density: 273.4/km^{2} (708.0/sq mi)
  - Households: 3,714

Economy
  - Income class: 4th municipal income class
  - Poverty incidence: 17.25% (2023)
  - Revenue: ₱ 128.9 million (2024)
  - Assets: ₱ 304.6 million (2024)
  - Expenditure: ₱ 38.88 million (2024)
  - Liabilities: ₱ 106.4 million (2024)

Service provider
  - Electricity: Surigao del Norte Electric Cooperative (SURNECO)
- Time zone: UTC+8 (PST)
- ZIP code: 8425
- PSGC: 1606701000
- IDD : area code: +63 (0)86
- Native languages: Surigaonon; Agusan; Cebuano; Mamanwa; Tagalog
- Website: https://lgualegriasdn.gov.ph/

Alegria, officially the Municipality of Alegria (Surigaonon: Lungsod nan Alegria; Cebuano: Lungsod sa Alegria; Tagalog: Bayan ng Alegria), is a municipality in the province of Surigao del Norte, Philippines. According to the 2024 census, it has a population of 17,846 people.

== History ==
Alegria was created by Republic Act No. 5239. It was originally the sitio of Anahaw founded by immigrants from the municipality of Bacuag. Sitio Anahaw was situated near Lake Mainit, and would often be flooded due to heavy rains. During rainy seasons, the local families transferred to a place now called Alegria.

The name Alegria was derived from the Spanish word which means "lively". Its name was given by Judge Sixto Olga who happened to spend a night in the place. The people offered him a party dance. Because their affair was lively he told the people to change the name Anahaw to Alegria.

Alegria became a barrio in 1927. It was formerly one of the biggest barrios in the municipality of Mainit. The municipality extends from the boundary of Kitcharao, Agusan del Norte, to Pungtod and Dayano that is the boundary of the mother municipality of Mainit.

== Geography ==
=== Barangays ===
Alegria is politically subdivided into 12 barangays. Each barangay consists of puroks while some have sitios.

- Alipao
- Anahaw
- Budlingin
- Camp Eduard (Geotina)
- Ferlda
- Gamuton
- Don Julio Ouano
- Ombong
- Poblacion (Alegria)
- Pongtud
- San Juan
- San Pedro

=== Climate ===
Climate data for Alegria, Surigao del Norte
| Month | Jan | Feb | Mar | Apr | May | Jun | Jul | Aug | Sep | Oct | Nov | Dec | Year |
|---|---|---|---|---|---|---|---|---|---|---|---|---|---|
| Mean daily maximum °C (°F) | 27 (81) | 27 (81) | 28 (82) | 29 (84) | 30 (86) | 29 (84) | 29 (84) | 29 (84) | 29 (84) | 29 (84) | 28 (82) | 28 (82) | 29 (83) |
| Mean daily minimum °C (°F) | 23 (73) | 22 (72) | 22 (72) | 23 (73) | 24 (75) | 25 (77) | 24 (75) | 24 (75) | 24 (75) | 24 (75) | 24 (75) | 23 (73) | 24 (74) |
| Average precipitation mm (inches) | 210 (8.3) | 161 (6.3) | 123 (4.8) | 85 (3.3) | 148 (5.8) | 186 (7.3) | 164 (6.5) | 157 (6.2) | 141 (5.6) | 190 (7.5) | 223 (8.8) | 200 (7.9) | 1,988 (78.3) |
| Average rainy days | 21.0 | 16.8 | 18.5 | 18.2 | 24.9 | 27.7 | 28.4 | 27.0 | 26.1 | 27.6 | 24.6 | 22.0 | 282.8 |
Source: Meteoblue

== Demographics ==
Population census of Alegria
| Year | Pop. | ±% p.a. |
|---|---|---|
| 1970 | 5,346 | — |
| 1975 | 6,330 | +3.45% |
| 1980 | 8,129 | +5.13% |
| 1990 | 9,715 | +1.80% |
| 1995 | 11,764 | +3.65% |
| 2000 | 12,923 | +2.03% |
| 2007 | 13,369 | +0.47% |
| 2010 | 14,539 | +3.10% |
| 2015 | 16,011 | +1.85% |
| 2020 | 16,184 | +0.23% |
| 2024 | 17,846 | +2.37% |
Source: Philippine Statistics Authority

The Surigaonon language is the common local language, while Cebuano, Filipino, and English are also spoken.

== Economy ==
Poverty incidence of Alegria

Source: Philippine Statistics Authority

== Transport ==
=== Railway station (proposed) ===
There are plans for a Mindanao railway network with a railway station in Alegria which would be an intermediate station on a branch line between Surigao and Davao

== Education ==
The following are schools in the center of Alegria:

- Alegria Central Elementary School
- Alegria National High School
- Global Competency Based Training Center
- Marajaw na Magbalantay Learning Center
- Alegria Stand Alone Senior High School

== See also ==
- Lake Mainit Development Alliance
