= Petra Macliing =

Filipino activist

Petra Macliing is a Filipino anti-Chico dam activist, hailing from Bontoc, Mountain Province and best known as "Mother Petra". As a member of the Mainit tribe of Bontoc, she joined the indigenous peoples of Bontoc and Kalinga in the fight to protect their "ili" (home village) against a World Bank funded dam project in the Philippines. She is a founding member of Cordillera People's Alliance and leader of the Montañosa Women's Federation. She is also a member of the Kalinga-Bontoc Peace Pact Holders Association (KBPPHA) and the Cordillera Elders Alliance (CEA). She founded Mainit Ub-ubfo and the Maiinit Irrigators Association.

== Personal life ==
Macliing was widowed at a young age, resulting in her having to raise eight children by herself. Macliing had seven daughters and one son, but her son died at a young age. To support her family, Macliing worked as a farmer and sold saris, managing to send all of her daughters to college. Her youngest daughter, lawyer Francesca Macliing-Claver, recounted that she was only 3 months old when her father died. "My mother was the only parent I have ever known", said Francesca.

== Awards and recognitions ==
- 2009 Laureate of the Women's World Summit Foundation's (WSSF) Prize for Rural Women for the year 2009
- Gawad Tanggol Karapatan in 2008
