= Claver, Surigao del Norte =

Municipality in Surigao del Norte, Philippines

Claver
- Municipality
- Municipality of Claver
- Municipal hall

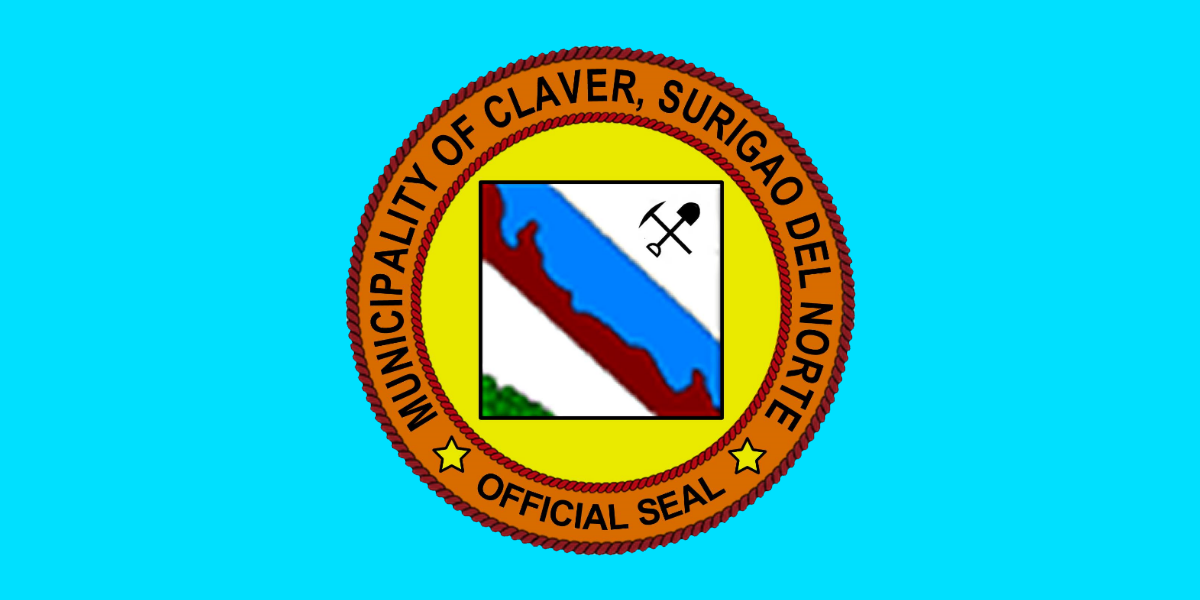
- Flag Seal

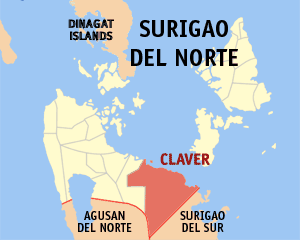
- Map of Surigao del Norte with Claver highlighted
- Interactive map of Claver
- Location within the Philippines
- Coordinates: 9°34′27″N 125°43′58″E
- Country: Philippines
- Region: Caraga
- Province: Surigao del Norte
- District: 2nd district
- Founded: September 13, 1955
- Barangays: 14 (see Barangays)

Government
  - Type: Sangguniang Bayan
  - Mayor: Georgia D. Gokiangkee (NP)
  - Vice Mayor: Leah D. Patan (NP)
  - Representative: Bernadette S. Barbers (NP)
  - Municipal Council: Members: Rhudney G. Basul (NP); Jaypee James N. Nasayao (NP); Redeemer A. Gabunada (NP); Reygie Boy E. Escutin (NP); Jemuel N. Galgo (NP); Maria Jane D. Jatulan (NP); Ernesto P. Sulapas (NP); Jourdan P. Moralde (NP)
  - Electorate: 33,102 voters (2025)

Area
  - Total: 322.60 km^{2} (124.56 sq mi)
- Elevation: 36 m (118 ft)
- Highest elevation: 337 m (1,106 ft)
- Lowest elevation: 0 m (0 ft)

Population (2024 census)
  - Total: 39,882
  - Density: 123.63/km^{2} (320.19/sq mi)
  - Households: 8,537

Economy
  - Income class: 1st municipal income class
  - Poverty incidence: 13.96% (2023)
  - Revenue: ₱ 920 million (2024)
  - Assets: ₱ 3,687 million (2024)
  - Expenditure: ₱ 762.4 million (2024)
  - Liabilities: ₱ 445.4 million (2024)

Service provider
  - Electricity: Surigao del Norte Electric Cooperative (SURNECO)
- Time zone: UTC+8 (PST)
- ZIP code: 8410
- PSGC: 1606706000
- IDD : area code: +63 (0)86
- Native languages: Surigaonon; Agusan; Cebuano; Tagalog
- Website: claver.gov.ph

Claver, officially the Municipality of Claver (Surigaonon: Lungsod nan Claver; Tagalog: Bayan ng Claver), is a municipality in the province of Surigao del Norte, Philippines. According to the 2024 census, it has a population of 39,882 people.

The town can be reached by bus, van-for-hire and jeepney from the Surigao Integrated Bus & Jeepney Terminal or at any point along the national highway. Its patron saint is St. Peter Claver and fiesta is celebrated every ninth day of September.

A large part of the municipal land area is a mining reservation due to extensive mineral deposits. This includes the Nickel ore loading port at Taganito, located 10 kilometers from the town proper of Claver, on the banks of Taganito river.

== History ==
=== World War II ===
Claver was one of many coastal towns that for some time were ignored after the American and Filipino military forces surrendered to the Japanese in May 1942. Claver became the headquarters of the 114th Infantry Regiment of 10th Military District, which was the guerrilla organization under the jurisdiction of the United States Army. Some residents had fled for fear of a Japanese raid or occupation of the town, but an American whose family took refuge there said Claver still had a feeling of normalcy to it. On a hill above town the guerrillas maintained a radio station by which they kept in contact with other military units. The radio operator decided, without the knowledge of his superiors, to jam wavelengths used by the Japanese. The Japanese got a fix on the location of the station as a result.

On November 30, 1943, the Japanese took action to put the radio station out of business. Very early in the morning several Japanese ships appeared off the coast and began shelling the town with five-inch guns. After a prolonged shelling, Japanese troops landed and destroyed the radio station. The guerrillas left as the Japanese entered town and moved their headquarters elsewhere. Because the town had supported the guerrillas, the town was ransacked. The troops then returned to the ships, which left.

Most of the residents fled south to avoid the Japanese, who did not occupy Claver. Claver remained almost abandoned until the end of the war.

=== Proposed Cityhood ===
In the 20th Congress, Bernadette Barbers filed House Bill No. 68 opening the possibility of future cityhood for the Municipality of Claver.

== Geography ==
In the north-east, Claver is bounded by the Pacific Ocean, to the west by the town of Gigaquit, and to the south by the boundary town of Carrascal, Surigao del Sur. It is approximately 60 kilometres (37 mi) southeast of the provincial capital, Surigao City.

=== Barangays ===
The Municipality of Claver is politically divided into 14 barangays. Each barangay consists of puroks while some have sitios.

- Bagakay (West Poblacion)
- Cabugo
- Cagdianao
- Daywan
- Hayanggabon
- Ladgaron (Poblacion)
- Lapinigan
- Magallanes
- Panatao
- Sapa
- Taganito
- Tayaga (Pob. East)
- Urbiztondo
- Wangke

The Mamanwa village of Toyatoya is located in Barangay Urbiztondo.

=== Climate ===
Climate data for Claver, Surigao del Norte
Month	Jan	Feb	Mar	Apr	May	Jun	Jul	Aug	Sep	Oct	Nov	Dec	Year
Mean daily maximum °C (°F)	27 (81)	28 (82)	28 (82)	30 (86)	30 (86)	30 (86)	29 (84)	30 (86)	30 (86)	29 (84)	29 (84)	28 (82)	29 (84)
Mean daily minimum °C (°F)	23 (73)	23 (73)	23 (73)	23 (73)	25 (77)	25 (77)	25 (77)	25 (77)	25 (77)	25 (77)	24 (75)	24 (75)	24 (75)
Average precipitation mm (inches)	210 (8.3)	161 (6.3)	123 (4.8)	85 (3.3)	148 (5.8)	186 (7.3)	164 (6.5)	157 (6.2)	141 (5.6)	190 (7.5)	223 (8.8)	200 (7.9)	1,988 (78.3)
Average rainy days	21.0	16.8	18.5	18.2	24.9	27.7	28.4	27.0	26.1	27.6	24.6	22.0	282.8
Source: Meteoblue (modeled/calculated data, not measured locally)

== Demographics ==
Population census of Claver
Year	Pop.	±% p.a.
1903	2,469	—
1960	7,744	+2.03%
1970	9,659	+2.23%
1975	10,755	+2.18%
1980	12,232	+2.61%
1990	13,452	+0.96%
1995	14,300	+1.15%
2000	16,403	+2.98%
2007	18,258	+1.49%
2010	23,702	+9.96%
2015	32,773	+6.37%
2020	36,033	+2.02%
2024	39,882	+2.47%
Source: Philippine Statistics Authority

== Economy ==
Poverty incidence of Claver (%)

Source: Philippine Statistics Authority

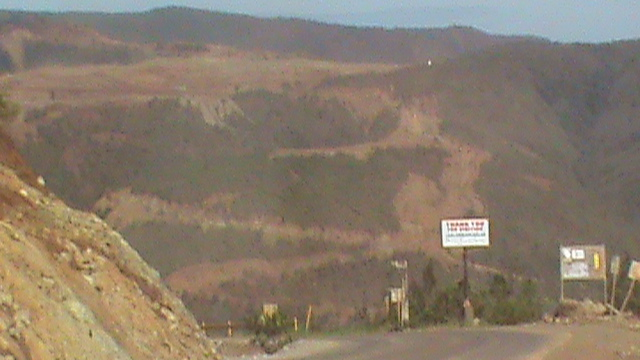
Open-pit mining in Claver

Claver is primarily a mining town with iron, nickel, copper and silver deposits on its Pulang Lupan mountains which are exploited mainly by the Taganito Mining Corporation. Mining, trading, and -traditionally - farming and fishing are the main sources of livelihood among residents. Fishing has become increasingly difficult due to water pollution as a consequence of mining activities.
