= Sison, Surigao del Norte =

Municipality in Surigao del Norte, Philippines

Sison
- Municipality
- Municipality of Sison
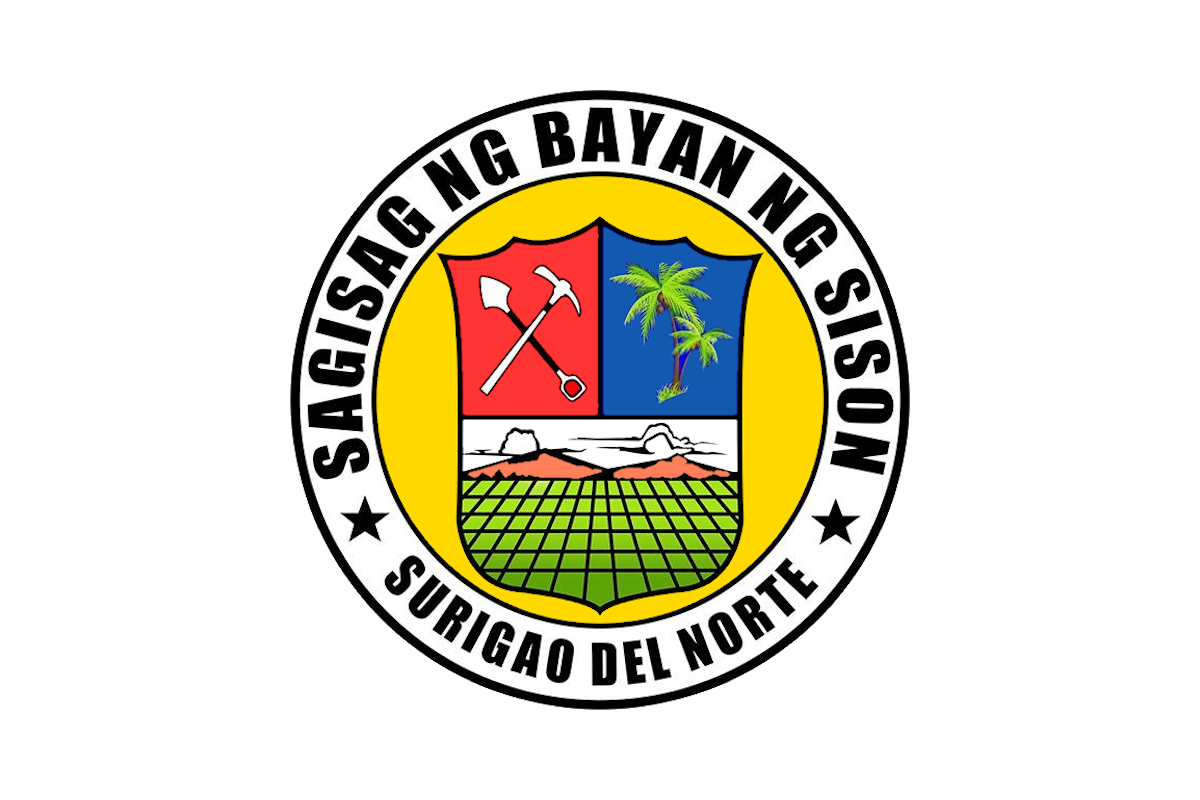
- Flag Seal

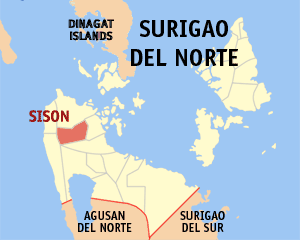
- Map of Surigao del Norte with Sison highlighted
- Interactive map of Sison
- Location within the Philippines
- Coordinates: 9°39′33″N 125°31′38″E
- Country: Philippines
- Region: Caraga
- Province: Surigao del Norte
- District: 2nd district
- Barangays: 12 (see Barangays)

Government
  - Type: Sangguniang Bayan
  - Mayor: Leicester P. Fetalvero (NP)
  - Vice Mayor: John Lester R. Fetalvero (NP)
  - Representative: Bernadette S. Barbers (NP)
  - Municipal Council: Members: Karissa R. Fetalvero-Paronia (NP); Reynaldo L. Calang (NP); Philip P. Cabag-Iran (NP); Guy E. Rafols (NP); Rosalinda B. Longos (NP); Lorna C. Limpot (NP); Jonathan B. Bulabog (NP); Warren P. Maitel (NP)
  - Electorate: 12,042 voters (2025)

Area
  - Total: 54.70 km^{2} (21.12 sq mi)
- Elevation: 107 m (351 ft)
- Highest elevation: 456 m (1,496 ft)
- Lowest elevation: 17 m (56 ft)

Population (2024 census)
  - Total: 14,826
  - Density: 271.0/km^{2} (702.0/sq mi)
  - Households: 3,399

Economy
  - Income class: 4th municipal income class
  - Poverty incidence: 15% (2023)
  - Revenue: ₱ 116.5 million (2024)
  - Assets: ₱ 374.6 million (2024)
  - Expenditure: ₱ 99.27 million (2024)
  - Liabilities: ₱ 84.71 million (2024)

Service provider
  - Electricity: Surigao del Norte Electric Cooperative (SURNECO)
- Time zone: UTC+8 (PST)
- ZIP code: 8404
- PSGC: 1606722000
- IDD : area code: +63 (0)86
- Native languages: Surigaonon; Agusan; Cebuano; Tagalog
- Website: www.sison.gov.ph

Sison, officially the Municipality of Sison (Surigaonon: Lungsod nan Sison; Tagalog: Bayan ng Sison), is a municipality in the province of Surigao del Norte, Philippines. According to the 2024 census, it has a population of 14,826 people.

== History ==
Through Executive Order No. 357, issued by President Carlos P. Garcia on September 15, 1959, six barrios of then-municipality of Surigao were organized into the municipality of Sison.

== Geography ==
=== Barangays ===
Sison is politically subdivided into 12 barangays. Each barangay consists of puroks while some have sitios.

- Biyabid
- Gacepan
- Ima
- Lower Patag
- Mabuhay
- Mayag
- Poblacion (San Pedro)
- San Isidro
- San Pablo
- Tagbayani
- Tinogpahan
- Upper Patag

=== Climate ===
Climate data for Sison, Surigao del Norte
Month	Jan	Feb	Mar	Apr	May	Jun	Jul	Aug	Sep	Oct	Nov	Dec	Year
Mean daily maximum °C (°F)	27 (81)	27 (81)	28 (82)	29 (84)	30 (86)	29 (84)	29 (84)	29 (84)	29 (84)	29 (84)	29 (84)	28 (82)	29 (83)
Mean daily minimum °C (°F)	23 (73)	23 (73)	23 (73)	23 (73)	24 (75)	25 (77)	24 (75)	25 (77)	25 (77)	24 (75)	24 (75)	24 (75)	24 (75)
Average precipitation mm (inches)	210 (8.3)	161 (6.3)	123 (4.8)	85 (3.3)	148 (5.8)	186 (7.3)	164 (6.5)	157 (6.2)	141 (5.6)	190 (7.5)	223 (8.8)	200 (7.9)	1,988 (78.3)
Average rainy days	21.0	16.8	18.5	18.2	24.9	27.7	28.4	27.0	26.1	27.6	24.6	22.0	282.8
Source: Meteoblue

== Demographics ==
Population census of Sison
Year	Pop.	±% p.a.
1960	6,532	—
1970	5,377	−1.92%
1975	7,316	+6.37%
1980	7,400	+0.23%
1990	8,269	+1.12%
1995	8,853	+1.29%
2000	10,046	+2.75%
2007	11,276	+1.61%
2010	11,377	+0.33%
2015	13,155	+2.80%
2020	14,290	+1.76%
2024	14,826	+0.89%
Source: Philippine Statistics Authority

The Surigaonon language is widely spoken, while Cebuano, Filipino and English are also used.

== Economy ==
Poverty incidence of Sison (%)

Source: Philippine Statistics Authority

== See also ==
- Lake Mainit Development Alliance
