= Tagana-an =

Municipality in Surigao del Norte, Philippines

- Municipality
- Municipality of Tagana-an
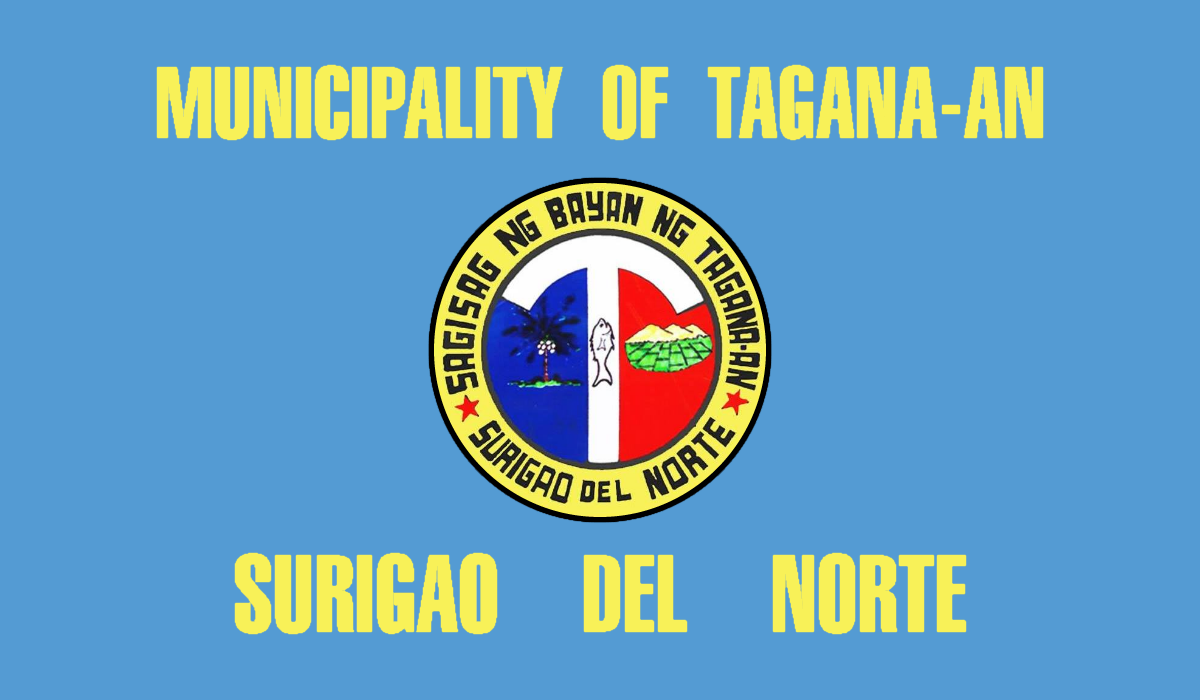
- Flag

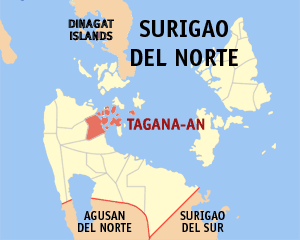
- Map of Surigao del Norte with Tagana-an highlighted
- Interactive map of Tagana-an
- Location within the Philippines
- Coordinates: 9°41′47″N 125°34′57″E
- Country: Philippines
- Region: Caraga
- Province: Surigao del Norte
- District: 2nd district
- Founded: June 22, 1947
- Barangays: 14 (see Barangays)

Government
  - Type: Sangguniang Bayan
  - Mayor: Cesar Ian B. Diaz (NP)
  - Vice Mayor: Cesar B. Diaz Jr. (NP)
  - Representative: Bernadette S. Barbers (NP)
  - Municipal Council: Members: Cherelyn L. Alceso (NP); Mercy B. Benedicto (NP); Leonie P. Reformina (NP); Conrado A. Astronomo II (NP); Ryan A. Manugas (NP); Maxuel E. Justin (NP); Marte M. Manubag (NP); Roy P. Torregoza (NP)
  - Electorate: 14,029 voters (2025)

Area
  - Total: 77.29 km^{2} (29.84 sq mi)
- Elevation: 54 m (177 ft)
- Highest elevation: 398 m (1,306 ft)
- Lowest elevation: 0 m (0 ft)

Population (2024 census)
  - Total: 18,158
  - Density: 234.9/km^{2} (608.5/sq mi)
  - Households: 4,243

Economy
  - Income class: 3rd municipal income class
  - Poverty incidence: 45.3% (2015)
  - Revenue: ₱ 192.9 million (2024)
  - Assets: ₱ 419.1 million (2024)
  - Expenditure: ₱ 151.2 million (2024)
  - Liabilities: ₱ 46.81 million (2024)

Service provider
  - Electricity: Surigao del Norte Electric Cooperative (SURNECO)
- Time zone: UTC+8 (PST)
- ZIP code: 8403
- PSGC: 1606725000
- IDD : area code: +63 (0)86
- Native languages: Surigaonon; Agusan; Cebuano; Tagalog
- Website: www.tagana-an.gov.ph

Tagana-an, officially the Municipality of Tagana-an (Surigaonon: Lungsod nan Tagana-an; Tagalog: Bayan ng Tagana-an), is a municipality in the province of Surigao del Norte, Philippines. According to the 2024 census, it has a population of 18,158 people.

It was created by virtue of Republic Act No. 194 on June 22, 1947.

== Geography ==
=== Barangays ===
Tagana-an is politically subdivided into 14 barangays. Each barangay consists of puroks while some have sitios.

- Aurora (Poblacion)
- Azucena (Poblacion)
- Banban
  - Sitio Dijo (under barangay Banban)
- Cawilan
- Fabio
- Himamaug
- Laurel
- Lower Libas
- Opong
- Patino
- Sampaguita (Poblacion)
- Talavera
- Union
- Upper Libas

=== Climate ===
Climate data for Tagana-an, Surigao del Norte
Month	Jan	Feb	Mar	Apr	May	Jun	Jul	Aug	Sep	Oct	Nov	Dec	Year
Mean daily maximum °C (°F)	27 (81)	28 (82)	28 (82)	30 (86)	30 (86)	30 (86)	29 (84)	30 (86)	30 (86)	29 (84)	29 (84)	28 (82)	29 (84)
Mean daily minimum °C (°F)	23 (73)	23 (73)	23 (73)	23 (73)	25 (77)	25 (77)	25 (77)	25 (77)	25 (77)	25 (77)	24 (75)	24 (75)	24 (75)
Average precipitation mm (inches)	210 (8.3)	161 (6.3)	123 (4.8)	85 (3.3)	148 (5.8)	186 (7.3)	164 (6.5)	157 (6.2)	141 (5.6)	190 (7.5)	223 (8.8)	200 (7.9)	1,988 (78.3)
Average rainy days	21.0	16.8	18.5	18.2	24.9	27.7	28.4	27.0	26.1	27.6	24.6	22.0	282.8
Source: Meteoblue

== Demographics ==
Population census of Tagana-an
Year	Pop.	±% p.a.
1903	1,656	—
1948	6,116	+2.95%
1960	7,460	+1.67%
1970	8,063	+0.78%
1975	9,285	+2.87%
1980	10,290	+2.08%
1990	11,585	+1.19%
1995	12,159	+0.91%
2000	12,844	+1.18%
2007	14,199	+1.39%
2010	15,366	+2.92%
2015	16,428	+1.28%
2020	17,323	+1.12%
2024	18,158	+1.14%
Source: Philippine Statistics Authority

== Economy ==
Poverty incidence of Tagana-an (%)

Source: Philippine Statistics Authority
