= Lake Mainit =

Lake in the Philippines

- Danaw sa Mainit (Cebuano); Lawa ng Mainit (Filipino)
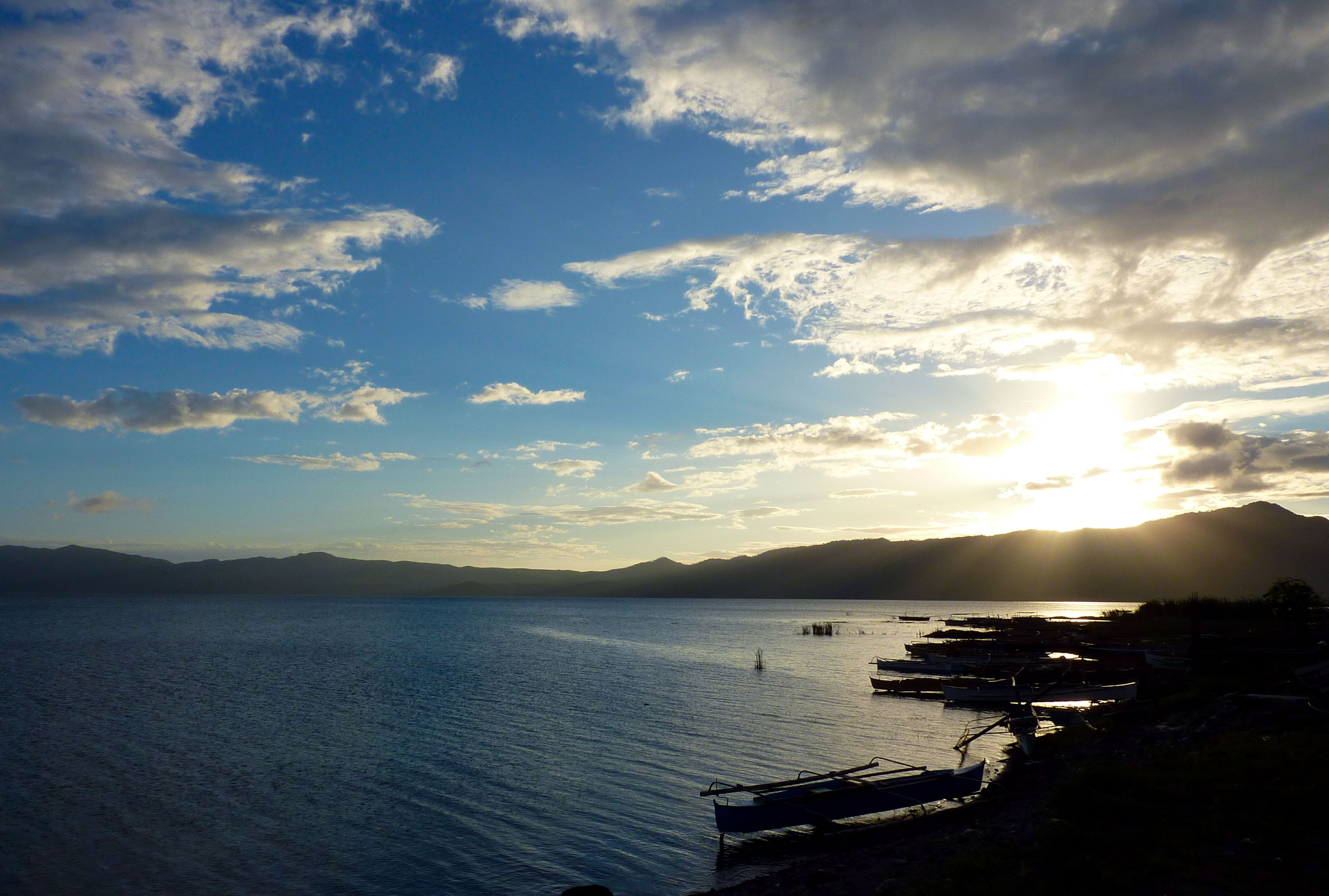
- Lake Mainit looking south from the northern shore

- Location within the Philippines
- Location: Mindanao
- Coordinates: 9°25′57″N 125°31′22″E
- Type: Oligotrophic Freshwater lake
- Primary inflows: 28 creeks and rivers
- Primary outflows: Calinawan River
- Catchment area: 870.72 km^{2} (336.19 sq mi)
- Basin countries: Philippines
- Max. length: 29.1 km (18.1 mi)
- Surface area: 170.6 km^{2} (65.9 sq mi)
- Average depth: 128 m (420 ft)
- Max. depth: 223 m (732 ft)
- Water volume: 18 km^{3} (4.3 cu mi)
- Shore length^{1}: 62.1 km (38.6 mi)
- Surface elevation: 42 m (138 ft)
- Settlements: Alegria; Jabonga; Kitcharao; Mainit
- ^{1} Shore length is not a well-defined measure.

Lake Mainit is an oligotrophic lake in Mindanao. It is the fourth largest lake in the Philippines, having a surface area of 170.6 square kilometers (65.9 sq mi). The lake is also the deepest lake in the country with maximum depth reaching 223 meters (732 ft). It is located in the northeastern section of Mindanao and shared between the provinces of Surigao del Norte and Agusan del Norte.

== Etymology ==
The name of the lake is a Visayan word mainit, which means "hot".

== Geography and hydrography ==
Lake Mainit is an oligotrophic lake shared between the provinces of Surigao del Norte and Agusan del Norte. It has a surface area of 170.6 square kilometers (65.9 sq mi) and is 29.1 square kilometers (11.2 sq mi) long.

The lake's 62.1-kilometer (38.6 mi) shoreline covers Mainit and Alegria of Surigao del Norte; and Jabonga and Kitcharao of Agusan del Norte.

Lake Mainit is also the reservoir of the Mainit-Tubay River Basin. The Kalinawan River is the main drainageway of the river basin moving water from Lake Mainit to the Butuan Bay.

It is the deepest lake in the Philippines with the maximum depth of 223 meters (732 ft). It has a mean depth of 128 meters (420 ft).

== Relation to humans ==
=== Research ===
Despite Lake Mainit as being considered a major lake in the Philippines, the water body is understudied and receive less scientific attention than Lake Lanao. The possible first biological work was by S.R. Manacop in 1937.

=== Economy ===
Fishing is an important economic activity by settlements around Lake Mainit. The Glossogobius giuris or the tank goby or locally known as the pijanga and the Channa striata, locally called as the haluan are the primary fish resources in Lake Mainit. However the population of the pijanga has been noted to experience a decline from 2014 to 2024. due to overfishing.

The traditional boat cast net method of laya is often used by fishers of Lake Mainit.

In 2023, a hydroelectric dam was inaugurated in Jabonga.

The Philippine–Japan Friendship Highway traverse the land adjacent on the eastern side of Lake Mainit.
