= Gigaquit =

Municipality in Surigao del Norte, Philippines

- Municipality
- Municipality of Gigaquit
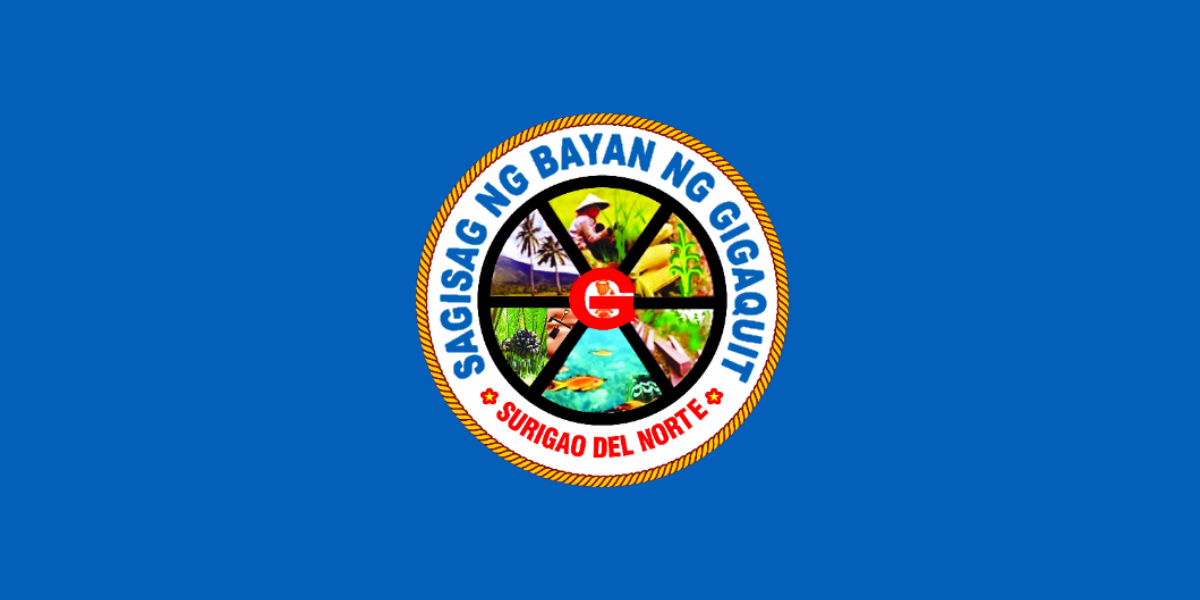
- Flag

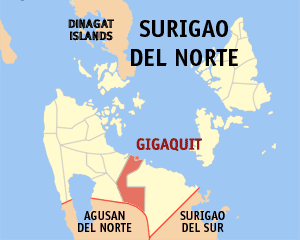
- Map of Surigao del Norte with Gigaquit highlighted
- Interactive map of Gigaquit
- Location within the Philippines
- Coordinates: 9°35′41″N 125°41′51″E
- Country: Philippines
- Region: Caraga
- Province: Surigao del Norte
- District: 2nd district
- Founded: 1850
- Barangays: 13 (see Barangays)

Government
  - Type: Sangguniang Bayan
  - Mayor: Chandru T. Bonite (NP)
  - Vice Mayor: Jennifer Pearl B. Bonite (NP)
  - Representative: Bernadette S. Barbers (NP)
  - Municipal Council: Members: Marichelle P. Lambus (NP); Angela D. Larong (NP); Randy G. Coleto (NP); Jefferson R. Eliot (NP); Joel P. Go (NP); Elias T. Borja Sr. (NP); Charleston T. Bonite (NP); Jorge O. Tumulak (NP)
  - Electorate: 14,842 voters (2025)

Area
  - Total: 138.11 km^{2} (53.32 sq mi)
- Elevation: 10 m (33 ft)
- Highest elevation: 222 m (728 ft)
- Lowest elevation: 0 m (0 ft)

Population (2024 census)
  - Total: 22,949
  - Density: 166.16/km^{2} (430.36/sq mi)
  - Households: 5,229

Economy
  - Income class: 3rd municipal income class
  - Poverty incidence: 15.36% (2023)
  - Revenue: ₱ 242.9 million (2024)
  - Assets: ₱ 670.9 million (2024)
  - Expenditure: ₱ 232.9 million (2024)
  - Liabilities: ₱ 15.24 million (2024)

Service provider
  - Electricity: Surigao del Norte Electric Cooperative (SURNECO)
- Time zone: UTC+8 (PST)
- ZIP code: 8409
- PSGC: 1606711000
- IDD : area code: +63 (0)86
- Native languages: Surigaonon; Agusan; Cebuano; Tagalog
- Website: www.gigaquit.gov.ph

Gigaquit, officially the Municipality of Gigaquit (Surigaonon: Lungsod nan Gigaquit; Tagalog: Bayan ng Gigaquit), is a municipality in the province of Surigao del Norte, Philippines. According to the 2024 census, it has a population of 22,949 people.

The name is derived from the words gigad (meaning "shore") and gakit (meaning "bamboo raft") and refers to the means of transportation that the early settlers used to travel from the inland to the shore.

== History ==
Gigaquit was established in 1850 by Cero, a native who fortified the place to make it safe from Moro raiders. During this period, the local population was Christianized by priests from religious orders who made Saint Augustine their patron saint.

Bacuag and Claver, which had been part of Gigaquit, became separate municipalities in 1918 and 1955 under Executive Order Nos. 61 and 126 respectively.

== Geography ==
=== Barangays ===
Gigaquit is politically subdivided into 13 barangays. Each barangay consists of puroks while some have sitios.

- Alambique (Poblacion)
- Anibongan
- Cam-boayon
- Camam-onan
- Ipil (Poblacion)
- Lahi
- Mahanub
- Poniente
- San Antonio (Bonot)
- San Isidro (Parang)
- Sico-sico
- Villaflor
- Villafranca

=== Climate ===
Climate data for Gigaquit, Surigao del Norte
Month	Jan	Feb	Mar	Apr	May	Jun	Jul	Aug	Sep	Oct	Nov	Dec	Year
Mean daily maximum °C (°F)	27 (81)	28 (82)	28 (82)	30 (86)	30 (86)	30 (86)	29 (84)	30 (86)	30 (86)	29 (84)	29 (84)	28 (82)	29 (84)
Mean daily minimum °C (°F)	23 (73)	23 (73)	23 (73)	23 (73)	25 (77)	25 (77)	25 (77)	25 (77)	25 (77)	25 (77)	24 (75)	24 (75)	24 (75)
Average precipitation mm (inches)	210 (8.3)	161 (6.3)	123 (4.8)	85 (3.3)	148 (5.8)	186 (7.3)	164 (6.5)	157 (6.2)	141 (5.6)	190 (7.5)	223 (8.8)	200 (7.9)	1,988 (78.3)
Average rainy days	21.0	16.8	18.5	18.2	24.9	27.7	28.4	27.0	26.1	27.6	24.6	22.0	282.8
Source: Meteoblue

== Demographics ==
Population census of Gigaquit
Year	Pop.	±% p.a.
1903	5,290	—
1918	14,244	+6.83%
1939	13,676	−0.19%
1948	14,431	+0.60%
1960	8,368	−4.44%
1970	11,097	+2.86%
1975	11,810	+1.26%
1980	13,186	+2.23%
1990	13,715	+0.39%
1995	15,261	+2.02%
2000	16,155	+1.23%
2007	18,870	+2.17%
2010	18,784	−0.17%
2015	20,864	+2.02%
2020	21,849	+0.98%
2024	22,949	+1.19%
Source: Philippine Statistics Authority

== Economy ==
Poverty incidence of Gigaquit (%)

Source: Philippine Statistics Authority
