= Tubod, Surigao del Norte =

Municipality in Surigao del Norte, Philippines

Tubod
- Municipality
- Municipality of Tubod
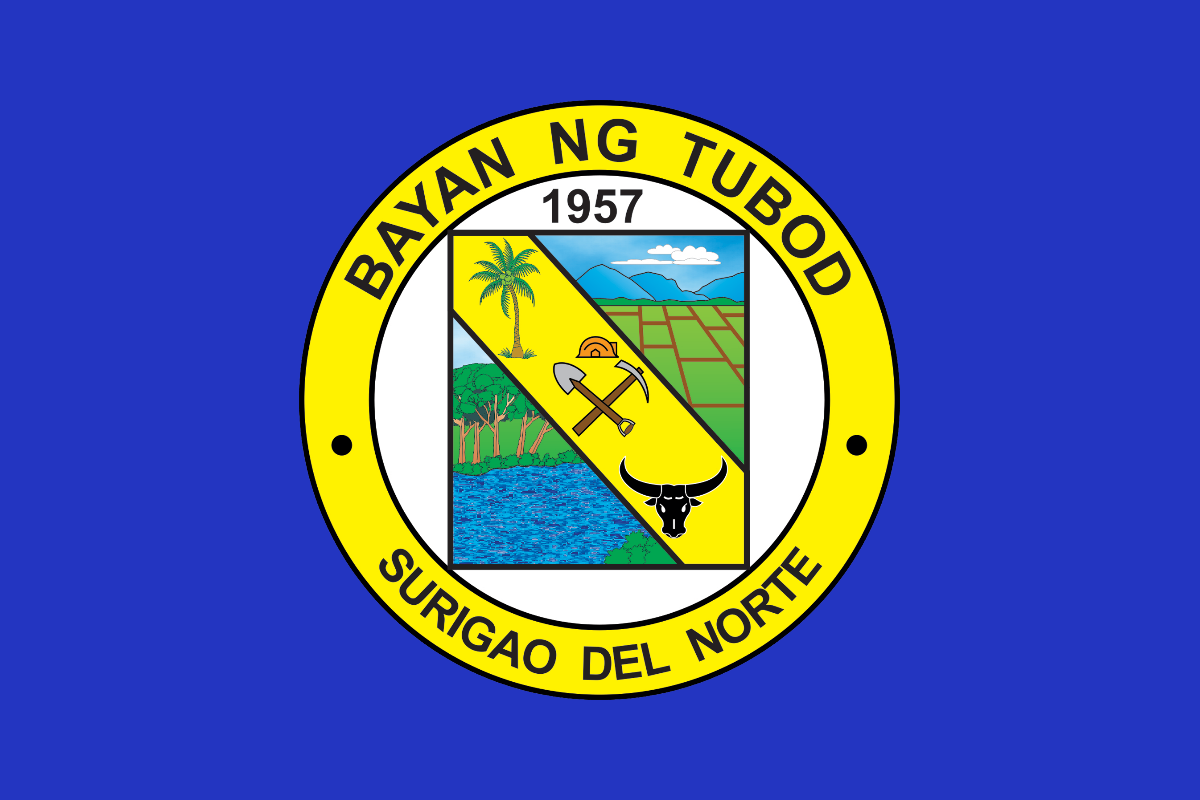
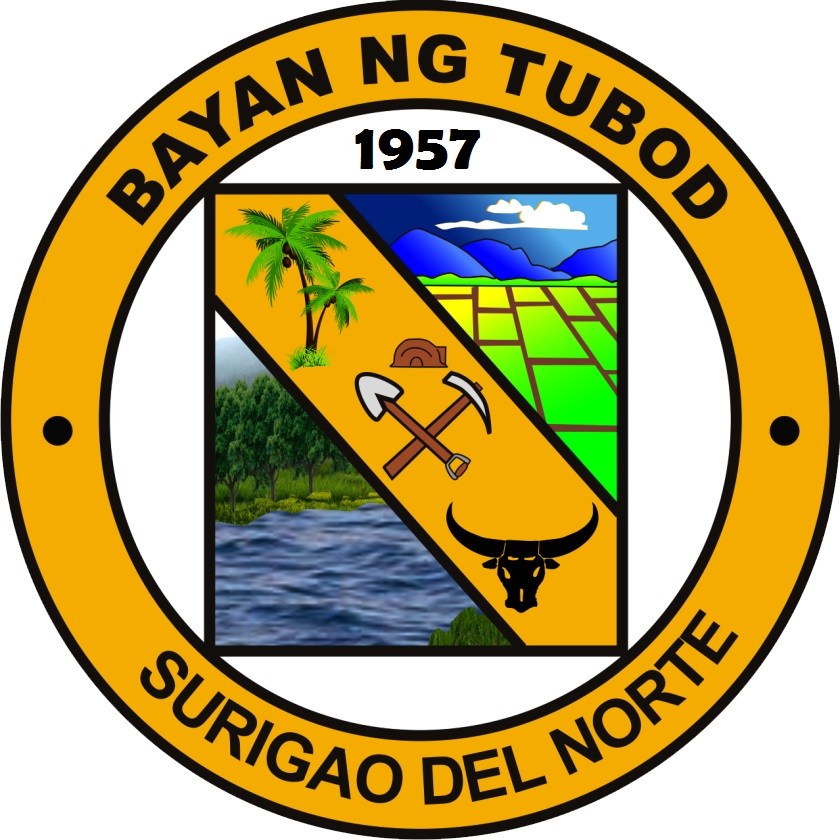
- Flag Seal

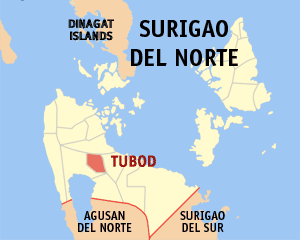
- Map of Surigao del Norte with Tubod highlighted
- Interactive map of Tubod
- Location within the Philippines
- Coordinates: 9°33′17″N 125°34′11″E
- Country: Philippines
- Region: Caraga
- Province: Surigao del Norte
- District: 2nd district
- Founded: September 18, 1957
- Barangays: 9 (see Barangays)

Government
  - Type: Sangguniang Bayan
  - Mayor: Richelle B. Romarate (NP)
  - Vice Mayor: Francis Ivan V. Dumadag (NP)
  - Representative: Bernadette S. Barbers (NP)
  - Municipal Council: Members: Lucia S. Dumadag (NP); Charlito A. Ignalig (NP); Carmelito R. Arado (NP); Rebecca A. Eledia (NP); Arlin I. Alipao (NP); Jerry L. Balgoma (NP); Porferio R. Alac (NP); Andrew Z. Imboy (NP)
  - Electorate: 11,636 voters (2025)

Area
  - Total: 45.34 km^{2} (17.51 sq mi)
- Elevation: 168 m (551 ft)
- Highest elevation: 631 m (2,070 ft)
- Lowest elevation: 38 m (125 ft)

Population (2024 census)
  - Total: 16,675
  - Density: 367.8/km^{2} (952.5/sq mi)
  - Households: 3,579

Economy
  - Income class: 4th municipal income class
  - Poverty incidence: 10.06% (2023)
  - Revenue: ₱ 162 million (2024)
  - Assets: ₱ 320.1 million (2024)
  - Expenditure: ₱ 120 million (2024)
  - Liabilities: ₱ 29.74 million (2024)

Service provider
  - Electricity: Surigao del Norte Electric Cooperative (SURNECO)
- Time zone: UTC+8 (PST)
- ZIP code: 8406
- PSGC: 1606727000
- IDD : area code: +63 (0)86
- Native languages: Surigaonon; Agusan; Cebuano; Tagalog
- Website: www.tubod.gov.ph

Tubod, officially the Municipality of Tubod (Surigaonon: Lungsod nan Tubod; Tagalog: Bayan ng Tubod), is a municipality in the province of Surigao del Norte, Philippines. According to the 2024 census, it has a population of 16,675 people.

== Geography ==
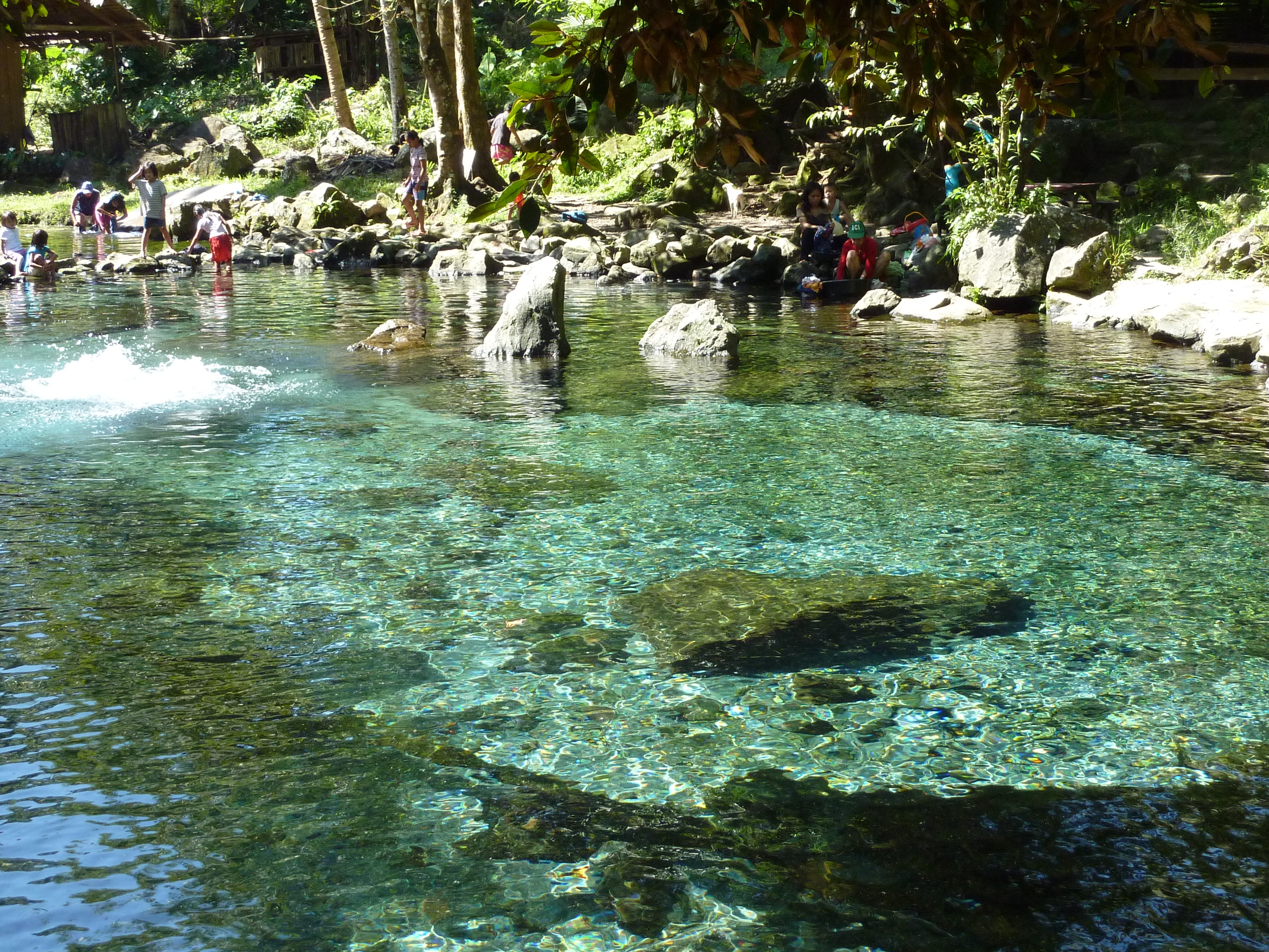
Songkoy Spring

Tubod lies in a valley at the centre of the peninsula that is the mainland portion of Surigao del Norte, with hills and mountains to the east and west of the town. A natural feature in the western hills is Songkoy Spring, where clear water emerges from the rainforest and collects in a natural pool that is a popular local swimming place.

Rural areas along the valley floor are dominated by agriculture, while the hills are home to coconut plantations, rainforest and gold mining. To the south of Tubod is Lake Mainit on the border between Surigao del Norte and Agusan del Norte.

The Maharlika Highway runs through the centre of Tubod and links the town with the major center of Surigao City in the north. The closest airport is in Surigao City which has flights to Cebu and Manila. Ferries at Surigao City connect the mainland with the adjacent islands of Surigao del Norte and the neighbouring province of Southern Leyte.

=== Climate ===
Climate data for Tubod, Surigao del Norte
Month	Jan	Feb	Mar	Apr	May	Jun	Jul	Aug	Sep	Oct	Nov	Dec	Year
Mean daily maximum °C (°F)	27 (81)	27 (81)	28 (82)	29 (84)	30 (86)	29 (84)	29 (84)	29 (84)	29 (84)	29 (84)	28 (82)	28 (82)	29 (83)
Mean daily minimum °C (°F)	23 (73)	23 (73)	23 (73)	23 (73)	24 (75)	25 (77)	24 (75)	24 (75)	24 (75)	24 (75)	24 (75)	23 (73)	24 (74)
Average precipitation mm (inches)	210 (8.3)	161 (6.3)	123 (4.8)	85 (3.3)	148 (5.8)	186 (7.3)	164 (6.5)	157 (6.2)	141 (5.6)	190 (7.5)	223 (8.8)	200 (7.9)	1,988 (78.3)
Average rainy days	21.0	16.8	18.5	18.2	24.9	27.7	28.4	27.0	26.1	27.6	24.6	22.0	282.8
Source: Meteoblue

=== Barangays ===
Tubod is politically subdivided into 9 barangays. Each barangay consists of puroks while some have sitios.

- Capayahan
- Cawilan
- Del Rosario
- Marga
- Motorpool
- Poblacion (Tubod)
- San Isidro
- San Pablo
- Timamana

== Demographics ==
Population census of Tubod
Year	Pop.	±% p.a.
1960	6,197	—
1970	6,665	+0.73%
1975	7,366	+2.03%
1980	8,056	+1.81%
1990	11,194	+3.34%
1995	10,318	−1.52%
2000	10,923	+1.23%
2007	11,664	+0.91%
2010	12,569	+2.76%
2015	14,206	+2.36%
2020	15,043	+1.21%
2024	16,675	+2.50%
Source: Philippine Statistics Authority

The Surigaonon language is the common local language, while Cebuano, Filipino, and English are also spoken.

== Economy ==
Poverty incidence of Tubod

Source: Philippine Statistics Authority

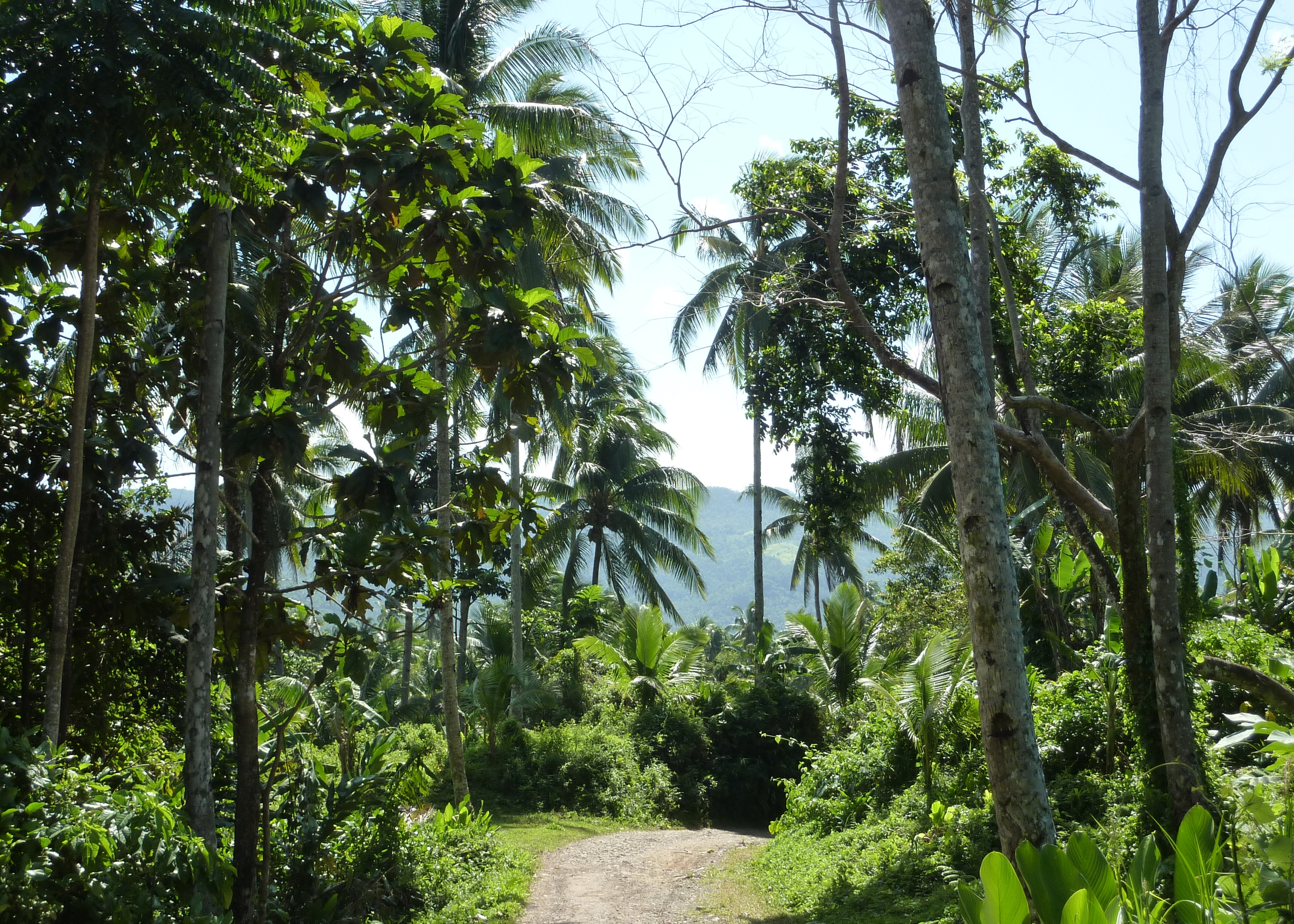
Coconut trees in the hills west of Tubod

== See also ==
- Lake Mainit Development Alliance
