= Surigaonon language =

Austronesian language of the Philippines

Surigaonon
- Tandaganon, Surigao, Surigawnon
- Native to: Philippines
- Region: Surigao del Norte, most parts of Surigao del Sur, and some portion of Dinagat Islands, Agusan del Norte, Agusan del Sur and Davao Oriental
- Ethnicity: Surigaonon
- Native speakers: 500,000 (2009)
- Language family: Austronesian: Malayo-Polynesian; Philippine; Greater Central Philippine; Central Philippine; Bisayan; Southern Bisayan; Surigaonon

Official status
- Recognised minority language in: Regional language in the Philippines
- Regulated by: Komisyon sa Wikang Filipino

Language codes
- ISO 639-3: Either: sgd – Surigaonon tgn – Tandaganon
- Glottolog: suri1274
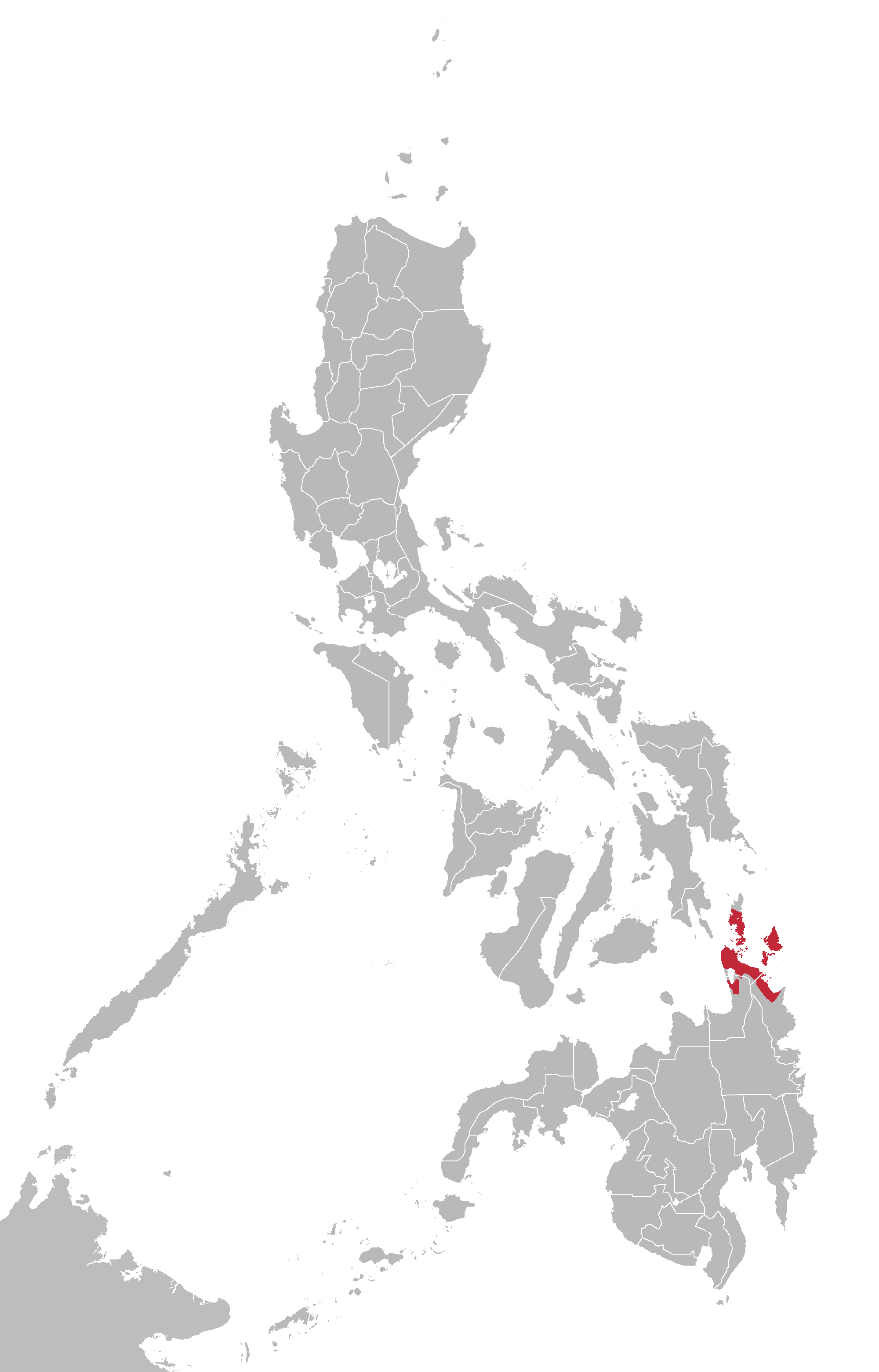
- Area where Surigaonon is spoken according to Ethnologue

Surigaonon (Filipino: Surigawnon) is an Austronesian language spoken by Surigaonon people. As a regional Philippine language, it is spoken in the province of Surigao del Norte, Surigao del Sur, Dinagat Islands, and some portions of Agusan del Norte, especially the towns near Lake Mainit, Agusan del Sur and Davao Oriental. The language, along with Butuanon and Tausug, are the only Visayan languages geographically native to Mindanao.

Surigaonon is a member of the Bisayan languages. It has been heavily influenced by Cebuano due to the influx of many Cebuanos in the region. However, most Cebuano speakers can hardly understand Surigaonon speakers, except for Cebuanos who have been living in the region for years.

Surigaonon is very closely related to the Tausug language of Sulu and the Butuanon language of Butuan.

== Varieties ==
=== Tandaganon ===
Tandaganon (also called Tinandag, Naturalis, Tagon-on) is a closely related variety spoken in Tandag and central Surigao del Sur municipalities of San Miguel, Tago, Bayabas, Cagwait, Marihatag, San Agustin, and most of Lianga. It can be classified as a separate language or alternatively as a southern variety of Surigaonon. There are about 100,000 speakers.

=== Surigaonon ===
Surigaonon (also called Jaun-Jaun, Waya-Waya) itself on the other hand is the northern (Surigao del Norte) variety, with about 400,000 speakers. Surigaonon speakers are distributed throughout Surigao del Norte, northern Surigao del Sur, and northern Agusan del Norte. Surigaonon and Tandaganon speakers can understand each other well, even if they use their own languages in conversation (similar to the mutual intelligibility between the Boholano dialect and the general Cebuano dialect).

Together, Surigaonon and Tandaganon are spoken in Surigao del Norte and most parts of Surigao del Sur, except in the City of Bislig, municipalities of Barobo, Hinatuan, Lingig, and Tagbina. In the non-Surigaonon-speaking areas of Surigao, most of the inhabitants are descended from Cebuano-speaking migrants, and the rest are natives who speak Kamayo, a Mansakan language.

== Phonology ==
According to Dumanig (2015), Surigaonon has a similar phonological inventory as its sister Bisayan languages, Cebuano and Boholano.

=== Vowels ===
Below is the vowel system of Surigaonon.

Surigaonon vowels
	Front	Central	Back
Close	i		u
Open		a	

=== Consonants ===
Below is a chart of Surigaonon consonants.

Surigaonon consonants
		Bilabial	Dental	Palatal	Velar	Glottal
Nasal		m	n		ŋ	
Plosive	Voiceless	p	t		k	ʔ
Plosive	Voiced	b	d		ɡ	
Affricate				d͡ʒ		
Fricative			s			h
Flap			ɾ			
Lateral			l			
Approximant		w		j		

Note: [j] is spelled y, [d͡ʒ] is spelled j and [ŋ] is spelled ng.
