= Surfing in the Philippines =

Overview of surfing in the Philippines

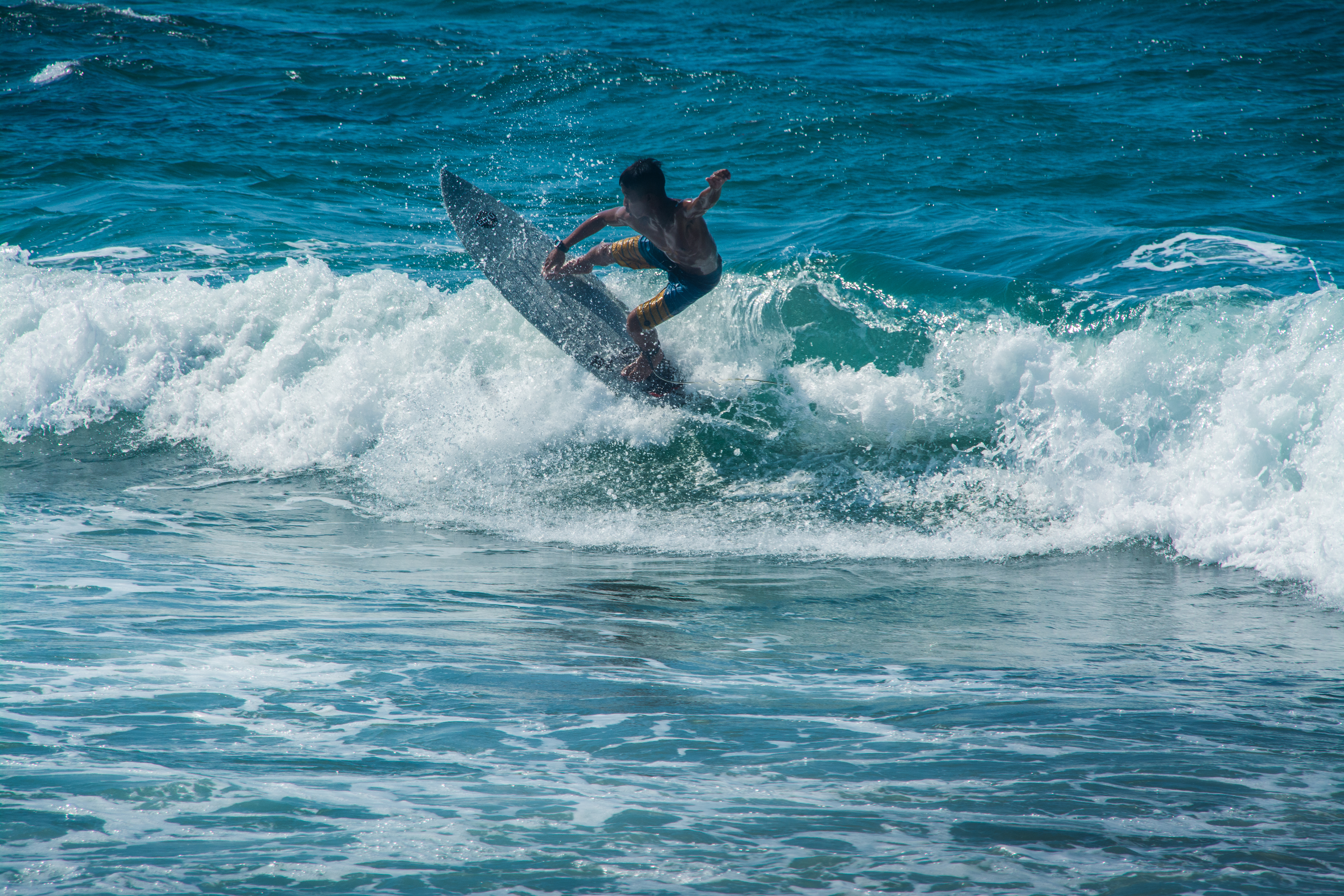
- A surfer at Baler, Aurora
- Country: Philippines
- Governing body: United Philippine Surfing Association
- National team: Philippines

Surfing in the Philippines is a sport in the country that is generating economic activity due to surf tourism, a form of sports tourism.

The island of Siargao is considered as the Surfing Capital of the Philippines and the location of the Cloud 9. La Union is called the Surfing Capital of the Northern Philippines and is considered as the “Birthplace of Philippine Surfing.”

The United Philippine Surfing Association is the official National Sports Association for Surfing in the Philippines recognized by the Philippine Sports Commission.

== History ==
In the 1970's, Apocalypse Now (1979) was filmed in Baler, Aurora and the Anti-war film had surfing scenes, local children watched the actors surf and were inspired to try it using the surf boards left after filming.

In August 6, 2023, Republic Act No. 11957 which recognize the Municipality of Baler in the Province of Aurora as the “Birthplace of Philippine Surfing”

In 2026, the World Surf League (WSL) Pro Championship Tour was held for the first time in the Philippines. The event in Cloud 9, Siargao was attended by 40 competitors from 11 countries. Through the Rising Tides program, the WSL introduced professional surfers to local surfers and children to help them develop.

== Events ==
=== Philippine Pro ===
The Philippines Pro is a World Surf League (WSL) Championship Tour event held at Cloud 9 in the town of General Luna, Surigao del Norte in Siargao Island, Philippines.

== Tourism ==
Due to the increasing interest in the sport and to support local employment, the Department of Labor and Employment (DOLE) has donated surfing equipment and lesson boards to schools in Calicoan Island.

== In popular culture ==
In the Philippines, surfing is sometimes featured in popular culture such as in the movie Siargao (2017) which is a Surf film shot in the island of Siargao.

== Notable personalities ==
- John Mark Tokong - Filipino surfer and Bronze Medalist in the 2019 Southeast Asian Games.
- Roger Casugay - Filipino surfer and Gold Medalist in the 2019 Southeast Asian Games.

== See also ==
- Surfing in Australia
- Sports in the Philippines
- Tourism in the Philippines
