= John Mark Tokong =

Filipino surfer (born 1996)

- Marama in 2026 during the WSL Philippines Pro in Siargao

Personal information
- Nickname: Marama
- Born: September 26, 1996 (age 30)
- Height: 157.5 cm (5 ft 2 in)
- Spouse: Danni Hughes (m. 2020)
- Children: 1

Surfing career
- Sport: Surfing
Medal record
Men's surfing
Representing Philippines
SEA Games
Bronze medal – third place	2019 Philippines	Shortboard

John Mark "Marama" Tokong is a Filipino professional surfer based in Siargao Island.

== Early life ==
John Mark Tokong was born on September 29, 1996. He is the son of a fisherman from the town of General Luna in Surigao del Norte.

== Career ==
John Mark Tokong is a surfer based in Siargao Island with Cloud 9 in General Luna as his home break. He is 157.5 cm (5 ft 2 in) high. He first competed in the junior level in 2012.

Tokong takes part in the Siargao International Surfing Cup which is held in his hometown. He won the 2015 edition beating fellow Filipino surfer Piso Alcala in the final. He finished as runners up in the 24th Siargao International Surfing Cup and won the 25th edition in October 2019.

Tokong took part at the surfing competition of the 2019 SEA Games in the Philippines. He competed in the men's shortboard where he won a bronze medal.

The COVID-19 pandemic has caused Tokong to not surf for a year. He was however able to participate in surfing again in early 2021. Tokong routinely competes in Australia from January to March. Tokong attempted to qualify for the 2024 Summer Olympics via the 2021 ISA World Surfing Games in El Salvador.

At the 26th Siargao International Surfing Cup in 2022, Tokong defended his title.

Tokong became the first Filipino surfer to qualify and compete in the 2023 World Surf League (WSL) Challenger Series in May in Gold Coast, Australia.

Tokong joined the Philippines Pro, the 11th leg of the 2026 season of the WSL as a wildcard entry. He got eliminated in the second round of the tournament held in Cloud 9, Siargao.

== Personal life ==
Tokong is married to Australian citizen Danni Hughes in 2020. He met Hughes who was a solo tourist visiting Siargao Island. They have a daughter.
