= Surfing in India =

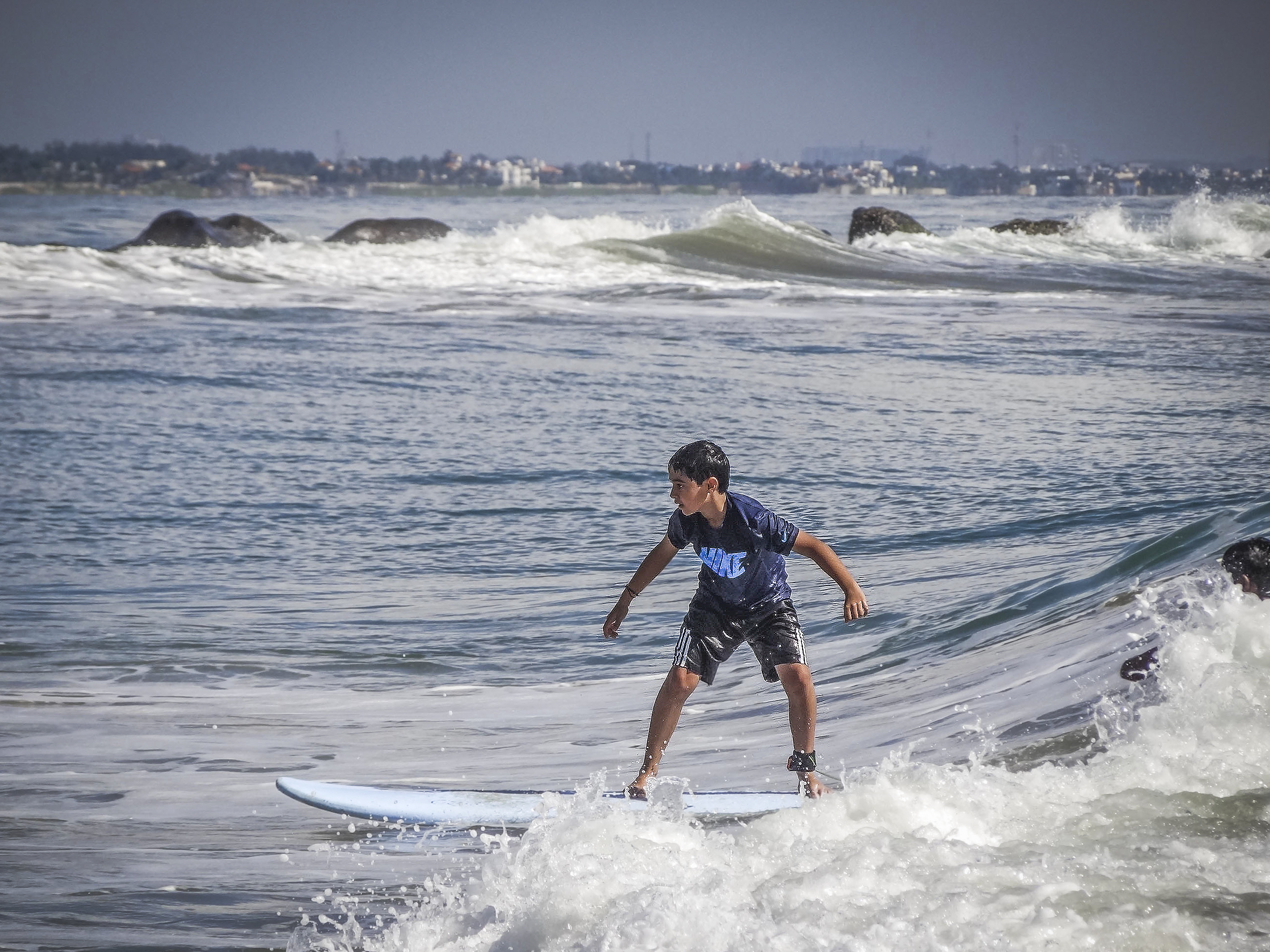
- Surfing in Kovalam
- Country: India
- Governing body: Surfing Federation of India
- National team(s): none

India has over 7,500 km of coastline, including that of the island groups, and this provides many opportune places for surfing. The largest waves are usually seen between May and September, the pre-monsoon and monsoon season. Some of the spots for surfing in India are Mangalore, Manipal, Kapu Beach, Sasihithlu and Murdeshwara in Karnataka, Kovalam, MuttukaduMahabalipuram, Covelong and Manapad in Tamil Nadu, Kovalam and Varkala in Kerala, Little Andaman and Lakshadweep.

Stand up paddling and surfing as in the current form was not a familiar sport in India until recently. The first competition was held in Mahabalipuram, organised and funded by Temple Adventures and Temple Surfboards in August 2011 and marked the first competitive event for surfing in India. The first surf camp happened in 2011 at Chennai, Tamil Nadu. It was organised by Bay of Life in association with the Surfing Federation of India (SFI); it marked the beginning of surfing as a popular, organised sport in the country. Surfing Federation of India is the governing body for surfing in India. Surfing Federation of India is the governing body for surfing in India. The state associations are Karnataka Surfing Association (KSA), Orissa Surfing Association (OSA), and Surfing and Water Sports Association of Tamil Nadu (SWAT).

Bay of Life (Chennai, Kovalam)Kallialay Surf School (Pondicherry) Shaka Surf Club (Udupi), Paddle for Future (Chidambaram) Lonely Surfers (Vishakapatnam), Mantra Surf Club (Mangalore) and Soul and Surf Club (Varkala), Salty Soul Surf Shack (Mandrem, Goa) are some of the accredited surf schools in India, among others.

Top surfing schools in India.

School name	Town/City	State
Bay of life	Kovalam, Chennnai	Tamilnadu
Surf Wala	Arambol	Goa
Mantra Surf Club	Mulki	Karnataka
Indica Surf Club	Mulki	Karnataka
Cocopelli Surf School	Gokarna	Karnataka
Kovalam Surf Club	Kovalam	Kerala
Soul & Surf	Varkala	Kerala
Kallialay Surf School	Pondicherry	Pondicherry
Surf Turf	Chennai	Tamil Nadu
Mumu Surf School	Mahabalipuram	Tamil Nadu
Murthy Surf School	Chennai	Tamil Nadu
Appu Surf Academy	Chennai	Tamil Nadu
Salty Soul Surf Shack	Mandrem	Goa

Covelong Point Surf Festival is an annual surfing event held near Surf Turf in Covelong Beach, Chennai. The festival attracts both national and international surfers who compete in various categories such as longboard, shortboard, and stand-up paddleboard. In addition to the surfing competition, the festival also includes music performances, art exhibitions, food stalls, and other activities that celebrate the surfing culture. The festival has become a major tourist attraction, drawing surf enthusiasts and spectators from all over the world.

== Indian surfers ==
- Jeremy Bujakowski represented India at the 1966 and 1968 World Surfing Championships.
- Ishita Malaviya
- Sinchana D. Gowda
- Ajeesh Ali
