= Celia Barboza =

Uruguayan surfer (born 1977)

- Born: María Celia Barboza; 1977 (age 47–48); La Paloma, Rocha, Uruguay
- Occupation(s): Surfer, teacher

Celia Barboza (born 1977) is a Uruguayan surfer, physical education teacher, and surfing instructor.

She is a member of the National Surfing Team and a columnist for the Unión de Surf del Uruguay (USU). She was the winner of the USU's National Surfing Circuit in 1995, 1996, 1997, 1998, 1999, 2000, 2006, and 2009. She took a bronze medal in a Mar del Plata Pan-American, and placed fifth at the World Masters of Surfing that was held in Ecuador in 2013, representing Uruguay, thus achieving the best result for that country at an International Surfing Association world championship. In 2015 she was Ladies Open champion of the Samsung Life Cup in Playa el Emir. She participated in the Uruguayan Circuit in 2016.
