= Conus hanshassi =

Scientific classification
- Domain: Eukaryota
- Kingdom: Animalia
- Phylum: Mollusca
- Class: Gastropoda
- Subclass: Caenogastropoda
- Order: Neogastropoda
- Superfamily: Conoidea
- Family: Conidae
- Genus: Conus
- Species: C. hanshassi

Binomial name
- Conus hanshassi (Lorenz & Barbier, 2012)

Synonyms
- Conus (Strategoconus) hanshassi (Lorenz & Barbier, 2012) · accepted, alternate representation; Protoconus hanshassi Lorenz & Barbier, 2012; Rolaniconus hanshassi (Lorenz & Barbier, 2012)

Species of sea snail

Conus hanshassi is a species of sea snail, a marine gastropod mollusk in the family Conidae, the cone snails, cone shells or cones.

These snails are predatory and venomous. They are capable of stinging humans.

== Description ==
The shell is generally elongated conical to turgid is shape, with an elevated spire and a definite shoulder. The shell has a white ground color and is marked with medium brown splotches and irregular rows of dots or dashes. The holotype is 23.3 mm (0.92 in) in length.

== Distribution ==
This marine species occurs off Siargao Island, Philippines, collected at 20 m (66 ft).
