= Philippines Pro =

Surfing competition in the Philippines

- Sport: Surfing
- Country: Philippines
- Most recent champions: M: (Brazil) Gabriel Medina; W: (United States) Caitlin Simmers
- Most titles: M: (Philippines) John Mark Tokong (4 titles)
- Website: www.worldsurfleague.com

Cloud 9 Boardwalk, the spectator's area of the event.

The Philippines Pro is a World Surf League (WSL) Championship Tour event held at Cloud 9 in the town of General Luna, Surigao del Norte in Siargao Island, Philippines.

== History ==
=== Siargao Surfing Classic ===
Then-Surigao del Norte Governor Francisco Matugas and then-General Luna Mayor Jaime Rusillon were credited for establishing the Siargao International Surfing Cup in 1994.

However, there are conflicting reports on when the tournament was established. (Note: The 2014 edition of the Siargao International Surfing Cup is considered as the 20th edition, which would peg the establishment date in 1994. However, a 1997 report states that 1st edition was held in 1996.) Governor Matugas and Mayor Rusillon organized the precursor of the international competition the Siargao Surfing Classic in 1993.

=== Siargao International Surfing Cup ===
The success of this Siargao Surfing Classic, led to the organization of the 1st Siargao International Surfing Cup in 1996. It is the same year when the original Cloud 9 tower in General Luna was built. Nevertheless, despite its amateur status at the time, prize money was awarded to winners since its inception.

From 2014, the event has been included in the WSL Qualifying Series (QS).

In 2020 and 2021, the Siargao International Surfing Cup was not held due to the COVID-19 pandemic. Typhoon Rai (Odette) in December 2021 then destroyed Cloud 9.

The tournament returned in 2022 and was held despite the delipidated state of the Cloud 9 platform. This is the first time that a men's and women's combined event was held. The Siargao International Women's Surfing Cup previously operated as a separate competition, with its ninth edition held in 2017.

=== Philippines Pro ===
The Philippines Pro debuted as a Championship Tour (CT) event in the 2026 WSL season. Work on organizing the tournament began back in October 2025 when WSL CEO Andrew Stark and Philippine Sports Commission chairman Patrick Gregorio met. The Cloud 9 structure was renovated in preparation of the CT event.

== Results ==
=== Men's ===
Year	Winner	Nation	Score	Runner-up	Nation	Score	Ref.
Siargao International Surfing Cup
1996	Neal Purchase Jr.	Australia	—	—	—	—	
1998	Dave McKinley	Australia	—	—	—	—	
1999	Rodolfo Alcala (1)	Philippines	—	—	—	—	
2000	Simone McShane	Australia	—	—	—	—	
2001	Drew Courtney	Australia	—	Steve Clements	Australia	—	
2002	Steve Hughes	Australia	—	—	—	—	
2003	Jay Thompson	Australia	—	Mark Matthews	Australia	—	
2004	Mark Matthews	Australia	—	—	—	—	
2005	Ryan Augustine	United States	—	—	—	—	
2006	Ryan Hipwood	Australia	—	—	—	—	
2007	Wade Goodall	Australia	—	—	—	—	
2008	Piso Alcala (1)	Philippines	—	—	—	—	
2009	Garret Parkes	Australia	—	Makua Rothman	Hawaii	—	
2010	Rodolfo Alcala (2)	Philippines	—	—	—	—	
2011	Enrique Ariitu	Tahiti	—	—	—	—	
2012	Piso Alcala (2)	Philippines	—	—	—	—	
2013	Putra Hermawan	Indonesia	12.65	Rodolfo Alcala	Philippines	—	
2014	Piso Alcala (3)	Philippines	19.45	Carlito Nogalo	Philippines	—	
2015	John Mark Tokong (1)	Philippines	17.25	Philmar Alipayo	Philippines	12.00	
2016	Sandon Whittaker	Australia	12.83	Philmar Alipayo	Philippines	11.20	
2017	Raoni Monteiro	Brazil	17.06	Thomas King	Costa Rica	16.33	
2018	Skip McCullough	United States	—	John Mark Tokong	Philippines	—	
2019	John Mark Tokong (2)	Philippines	16.80	Noah Beschen	Hawaii	16.75	
2020–2021	Not held due to the COVID-19 pandemic						
2022	John Mark Tokong (3)	Philippines	15.80	Oney Anwar	Indonesia	14.15	
2023	John Mark Tokong (4)	Philippines	16.25	Koh Azuchi	Japan	10.95	
2024	Oscar Berry	Australia	11.56	Xavier Huxtable	Australia	11.90	
2025	Bronson Meydi	Indonesia	15.33	Ben Loretson	Australia	14.70	
Philippines Pro — WSL
2026	Gabriel Medina	Brazil	16.93	Jack Robinson	Australia	14.50	

=== Women's ===
Year	Winner	Nation	Score	Runner-up	Nation	Score	Ref.
Siargao International Surfing Cup
2022	Nilbie Blancada	Philippines	11.50	Anon Matsuoka	Japan	10.35	
2023	Anon Matsuoka	Japan	12.00	Sky Brown	Great Britain	11.10	
2024	Sierra Kerr	Australia	17.90	Charli Hately	Australia	8.07	
2025	Ziggy Mackenzie	Australia	12.73	Isla Huppatz	Australia	11.60	
Philippines Pro — WSL
2026	Caitlin Simmers	United States	12.00	Isabella Nichols	Australia	10.77	
