= Maladera siargaoensis =

Scientific classification
- Kingdom: Animalia
- Phylum: Arthropoda
- Clade: Pancrustacea
- Class: Insecta
- Order: Coleoptera
- Suborder: Polyphaga
- Infraorder: Scarabaeiformia
- Family: Scarabaeidae
- Genus: Maladera
- Species: M. siargaoensis

Binomial name
- Maladera siargaoensis (Moser, 1922)

Synonyms
- Autoserica siargaoensis Moser, 1922

Species of beetle

Maladera siargaoensis is a species of beetle of the family Scarabaeidae. It is found in the Philippines (Siargao).

== Description ==
Adults reach a length of about 7 mm. They are blackish-brown and opaque. The antennae are reddish-yellow. The pronotum has ciliated sides and the surface is moderately densely punctate. The elytra are seriate-punctate, with the interstices very slightly convex and covered with minute punctations.
