= Surfing South Africa =

Governing body for the sport of surfing in South Africa

- Sport: Surfing
- Jurisdiction: South Africa
- Abbreviation: SSA
- Founded: 1965
- Affiliation: ISF
- Headquarters: Cape Town
- President: Isaac February
- Vice president(s): Ann Wright, Bongani Xulu
- Director: Johnny Bakker, Bruce Anderson, Lonwabo Alvin Mtatshi, Greg Emslie, Petronel Posthumus

Official website
- www.surfingsouthafrica.co.za
- (South Africa)

Surfing South Africa (SSA) is the governing body for the sport of surfing in South Africa, and a recognised member of the world governing body, the International Surfing Association (ISA). SSA is also an affiliate of the South African Sports Confederation and Olympic Committee (SASCOC), which, alongside Sport and Recreation South Africa (SRSA) supervises all organised sport in South Africa.

SSA is responsible for the control of all aspects of Surfing in South Africa, from entry-level participation to the management of the elite level Pro Surf Tour (PST). Provincial bodies, along with the SA Longboarding Association, the SA Bodyboarding Association and the SA Students Surfing Association are all affiliated to Surfing South Africa.

== History ==
Surfing as a sport in South Africa started in Durban around the 1940s. The South African Surfing Association (SAFA) was founded in 1965. Around the middle of the 1960s surfing began to reach popularity worldwide, surfers from South Africa were at the vanguard of this movement. The popular surf film The Endless Summer endeared many people to the waves of Kwazulu Natal, the Western Cape and the Eastern Cape.

This exposure led to the hosting of many surfing competitions in South Africa. The Gunston 500 was first hosted at Bay of Plenty Beach in Durban in 1969. The Gunston grew into a major South African sporting attraction during the holiday season attracting huge crowds to the Durban beachfront. Other events, including the 1978 ISA World Championships at Nahoon Reef in East London were hosted followed by the Spur Steak Ranch Surfabouts, that used a mobile venue and featured many of the best surfers in the world during the mid 1980s and the Billabong Pro contests hosted in Jeffreys Bay. Following it all was the Quiksilver ISA World Surfing Games held in Durban in 2002 and the Mr Price Pro competition that replaced the Gunston 500

== See also ==
- Surfing in South Africa
- Sport in South Africa
