= Guyam Island =

Island in Surigao del Norte, Philippines

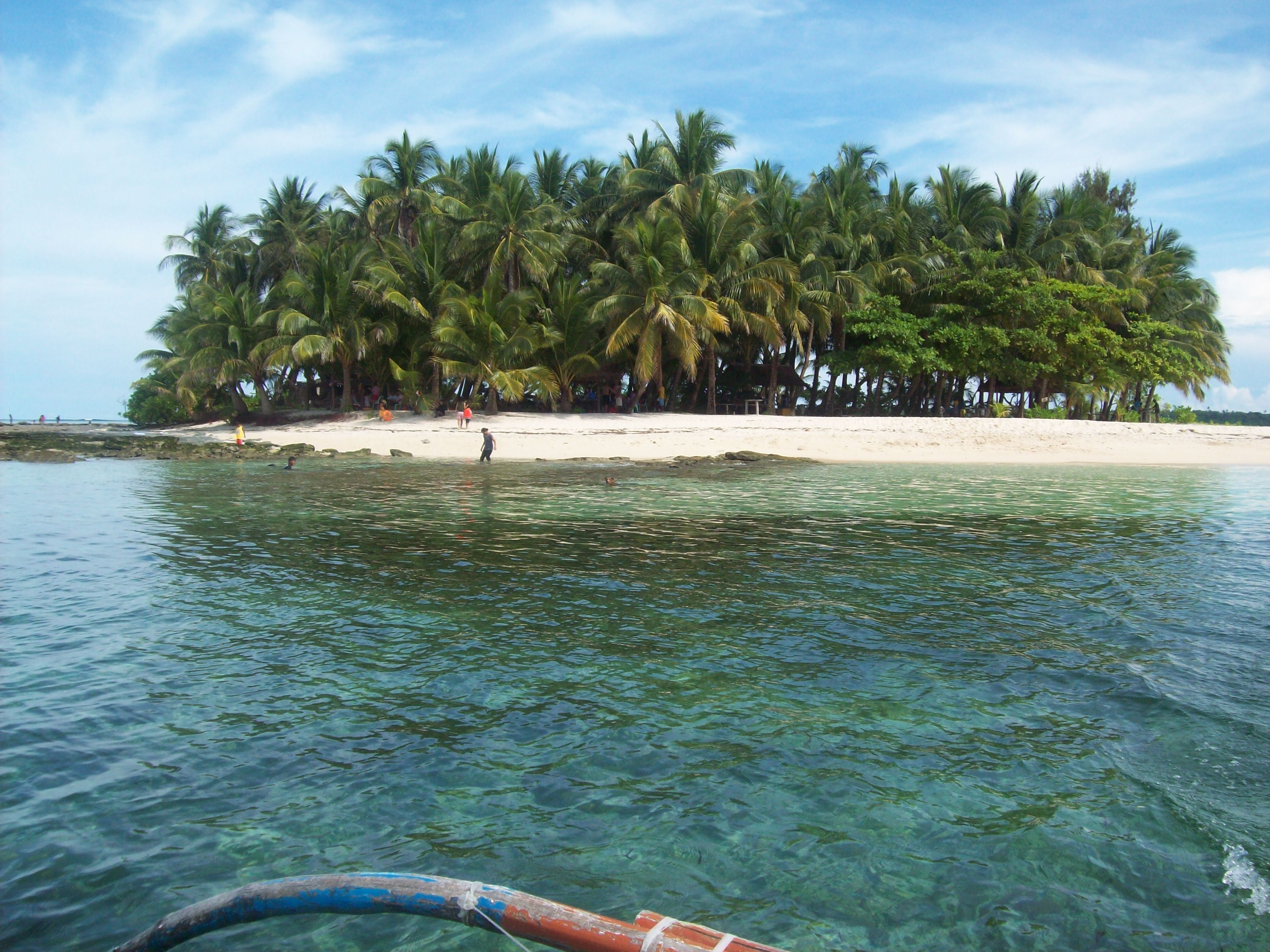
- The island in 2012

- Location within Philippines

Geography
- Location: Philippine Sea
- Coordinates: 9°45′54″N 126°10′4″E
- Area: 4,300 m^{2} (46,000 sq ft)
- Length: 64 m (210 ft)
- Width: 84 m (276 ft)
- Coastline: 230 m (750 ft)

Administration
- Philippines
- Region: Caraga
- Province: Surigao del Norte
- Municipality: General Luna

Guyam Island is a tear-drop shaped island in the Philippine Sea situated 780 kilometres (480 mi) southeast of Manila in the province of Surigao del Norte. It is around 2 kilometres (1.2 mi) south-southeast of General Luna municipality. It is a popular stop for tourists doing island-hopping trips.

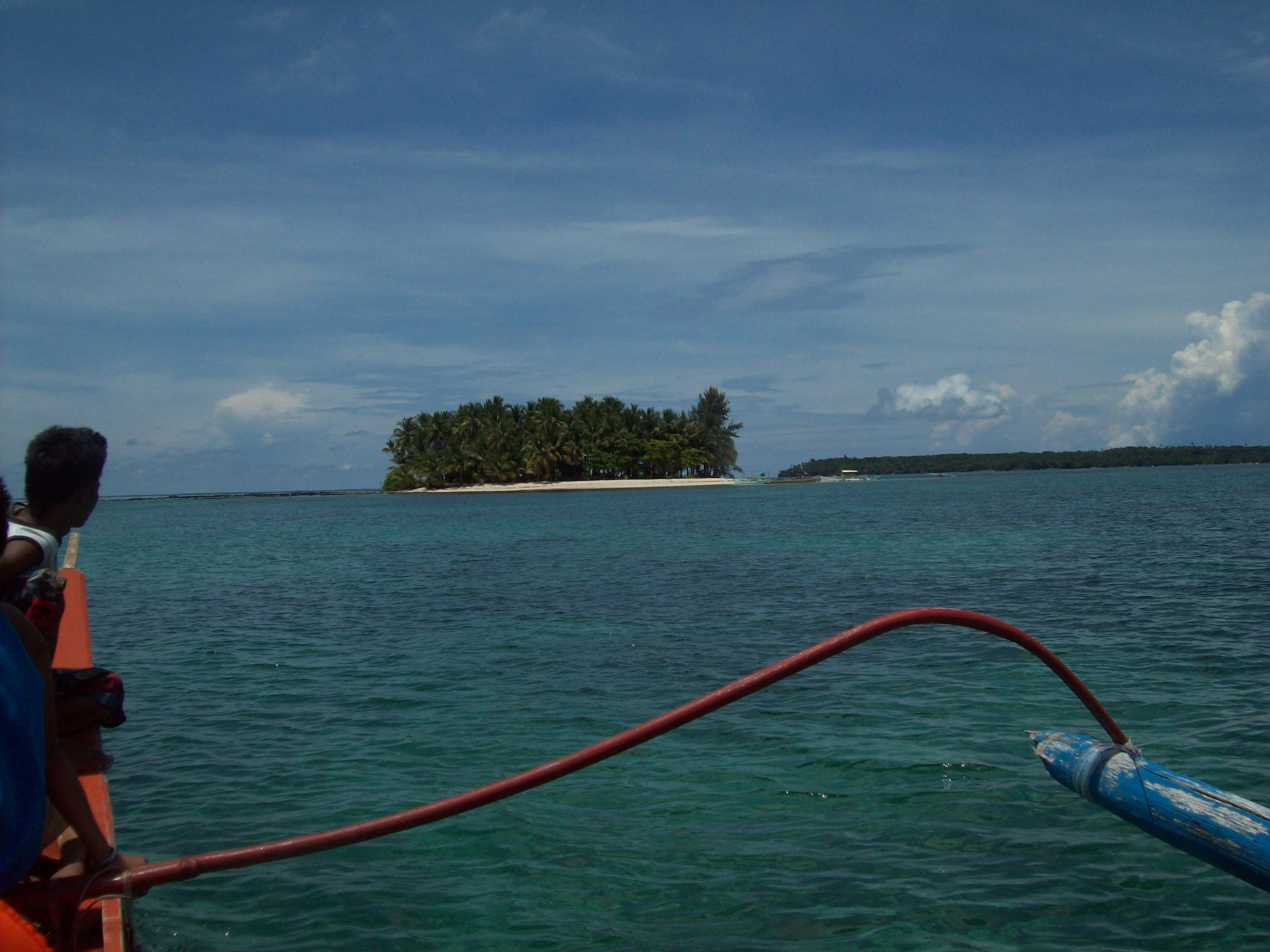

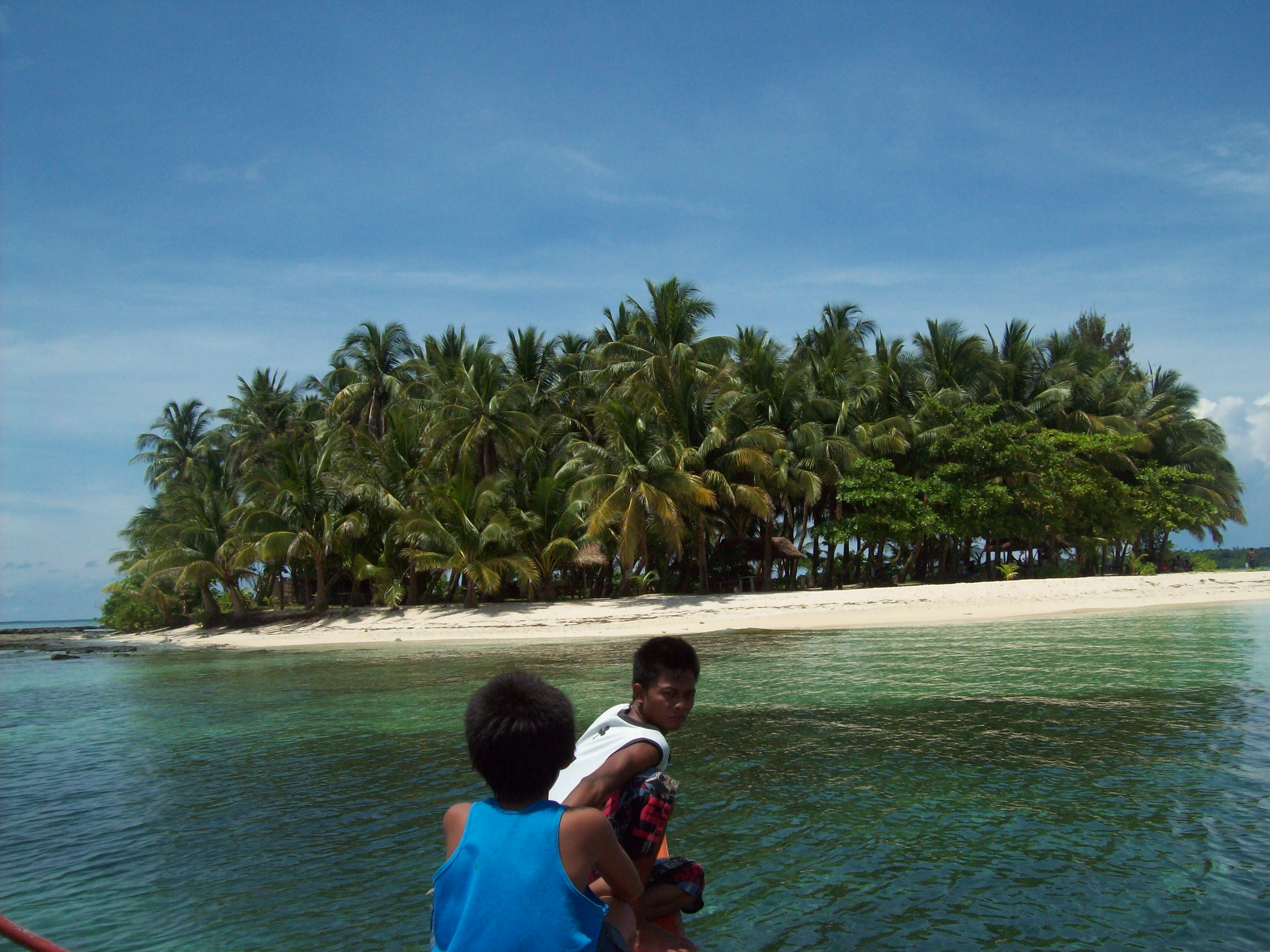

== See also ==
- Desert island
- List of islands
