= United Philippine Surfing Association =

United Philippine Surfing Association UPSA
- IOC nation: Philippines
- Sport: Surfing

Affiliations
- International federation: International Surfing Association (ISA)
- President: Jose Raul Canlas
- Country: Philippines

The United Philippine Surfing Association (UPSA) is the national sports body for surfing in the Philippines. It is a member of the International Surfing Association.

== History ==
The United Philippine Surfing Association (UPSA) was established in 2007 and was shortly given probationary status by the Philippine Olympic Committee (POC) so that it can accredit surfers for the 2008 Asian Beach Games in Bali, Indonesia. Luke Landrigan was one of the founders of the association.

In October 2016, the UPSA organized the first ever ISA International Judging and Officiating course in the Philippines.

On October 4, 2018, the UPSA has applied for associate membership with the POC following the inclusion of surfing in the 2020 Summer Olympics in Tokyo, Japan.

== Administration ==
As of October 2018, the Constitution and By-Laws of the UPSA requires every member of its board to be a certified surfer within the last five years. As of the same time, the President of the association is Jose Raul Canlas.

== Members ==
More than 300 surfers from three active clubs Siargao, La Union and Baler as well as Zambales, Samar, and Bicol region forms part of the membership of the UPSA as of October 2018.
