= Lithuanian Surfing Association =

Lithuanian Surfing Association Lithuanian: Lietuvos bangų sporto asociacija
- Sport: Surfing; Standup paddleboarding
- Category: National association
- Abbreviation: LBSA
- Founded: 2016
- Affiliation: ISA
- Headquarters: Vilnius, Lithuania
- President: Girmantas Neniškis

Official website
- www.lbsa.lt

Lithuanian Surfing Association (Lithuanian: Lietuvos bangų sporto asociacija) is a national governing body of surfing and standup paddleboarding sports in Lithuania.

== History ==
Lithuanian Surfing Association was founded in 2016 at Klaipėda, Lithuania.

Organisation become a member of International Surfing Association.
