= Ishita Malaviya =

Indian surfer

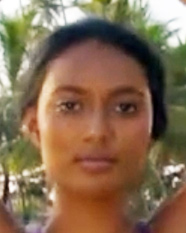
- Ishita Malaviya in 2019

Personal information
- Born: Mumbai, India

Surfing career
- Sport: Surfing

Ishita Malaviya is India's first professional female surfer.

== Career ==
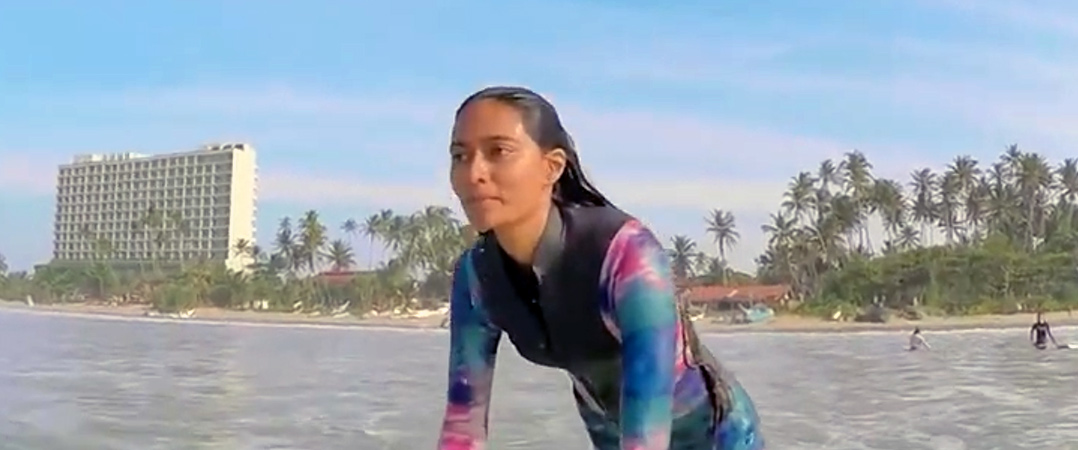
Ishita Malaviya surfing

Malaviya began surfing in 2007 after meeting a German exchange student. She currently runs a surf club named the Shaka Surf Club as well as a camp called Camp Namaloha in Coastal Karnataka in India. The camp, together with the Australian Life Saving Society and Rashitriya Life Saving Society, established the "Nippers Program" for training junior life guards.

Malaviya, along with her high school friend and boyfriend Tushar Pathiyan, runs the surf club from the village of Kodi Bengre, located on the Konkan Coast. As of 2014, she is the only Indian to be appointed as a brand ambassador for Roxy surfwear.

Malaviya has stated that her ambition is to promote the Indian coastline as an international surfing destination.

In 2019, she was listed in the Forbes 30 Under 30 list for Asia.

== Films ==
In 2014, the surf club uploaded a video titled The India Surf Story. It was a thirteen-minute-long documentary about the origins of surfing in India. Most of the footage for the video was shot at the India Surf Festival held in 2013 at Odisha. The film took shape over a period of eight months and was made with a small budget using borrowed equipment and volunteer effort.

In 2014, a documentary film titled Beyond The Surface, was made, based on the life of Malaviya and other female surfers. Another documentary chronicling the life of Malaviya was co-made by the groups Storytellers for Good and the Brown Girls Surf.

== Personal life ==
Malaviya was born in Bombay (now Mumbai) and studied journalism at Manipal University, Manipal. At the age of 22, she moved to Manipal, Karnataka permanently to start her surfing club, The Shaka Surf Club. She has a degree in journalism.

== See also ==
- Surfing in India
