= Surfing in South Africa =

- Country: South Africa
- Governing body: Surfing South Africa
- National team: South Africa Olympics team

International competitions
- Summer Olympics

Surfing in South Africa began in Durban in the 1940s.

== History ==
By 1965 the South African Surfing Association was formed. In recent years surfing associations have tried to encourage more black South Africans to take up surfing.

South Africa was banned from most international surfing competitions due to apartheid.

== Famous surf spots ==
=== Muizenberg ===
This beach is the home of surfing in South Africa and may be the oldest surfing venue in Africa. Heather Price, a Zimbabwean-born woman, is considered to be the first ever person recorded stand-up surfing in South Africa, with her photo appearing in a local newspaper in 1919.

=== Jeffreys Bay ===
Jeffreys Bay is one of the five most famous surfing destinations (no.2 on one "best in the world" surfing list) in the world. It hosted the annual Billabong Pro ASP World Tour surfing event at Super Tubes, though its 2024 edition was cancelled and the event's future remains unclear.

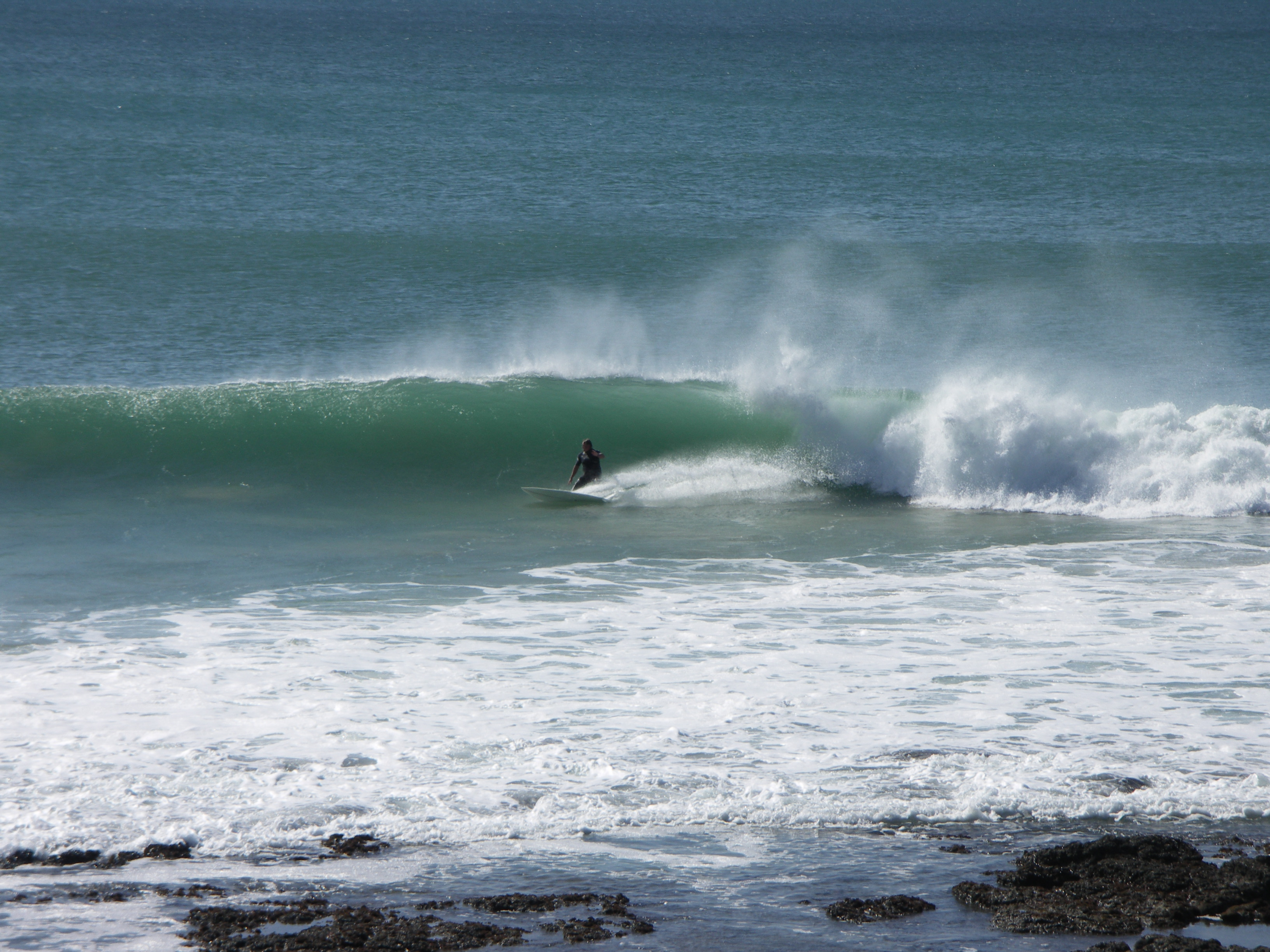
Surfing JBay

=== St Francis Bay ===
A right hand point wave at St. Francis Bay was first idolised and promoted in the cult classic surf movie The Endless Summer in the 1960s.
