= Cloud 9 (Siargao) =

Surfing location in Siargao, Philippines

- Cloud 9 Tower of Froth and boardwalk in October 2026
- Interactive map of Cloud 9
- Address: General Luna; Philippines
- Location: Siargao Island, Surigao del Norte
- Coordinates: 9°48′49″N 126°09′46″E

Construction
- Built: 1996
- Expanded: 2003 (tower)
- Demolished: 2021
- Rebuilt: 2022–2026

Tenant
- Philippines Pro (1996–present)

Cloud 9 is a surfing location on Siargao Island, situated in the municipality of General Luna in the province of Surigao del Norte, Philippines.

== History ==
=== Early years ===
Surfing in Siargao Island in the Philippines started as early as 1980. Cuban-American Tony Arruza and Australian Steve Jones visited the island looking for surfing locations in 1980. They came to an area that would later be known as Jacking Horse, which is near Cloud 9.

In January 1989, American drug smugger, John Michael Boyum came to the General Luna town of the island after roughly two years after his release from prison in Nouméa, New Caledonia in 1987 and lived under the alias Max Walker. He is credited for promoting surfing destinations in Indonesia as a surfing spot. He died after six months of living in Siargao after a 40 days-plus fasting. His death in the island is later cited as contributing Siargao's publicity that would lead to its establishment as a surfing spot of its own.

=== Calllahan visit and Cloud 9 naming ===
In September 1992, American surf photographer John Seaton Callahan traveled to Siargao with American surfers Taylor Knox and Evan Slater, bringing international attention to the island through feature articles published in magazines worldwide, including a March 1993 spread in Surfer. Callahan named the wave "Cloud 9" after the local no-melt Cloud 9 chocolate bars sold in General Luna that the crew ate after surfing.

=== Development as a surfing spot ===
Following the publicity, Surigao del Norte Governor Francisco Matugas and General Luna Mayor Jaime Rusillon improved access to the break and organized the first Siargao Surfing Classic in 1993.

Cloud 9 boardwalk and tower. May 2018.

The success of the Siargao Surfing Classic led to the establishment of the annual Siargao International Surfing Cup at Cloud 9 in 1996. The original Cloud 9 boardwalk structure was built that same year, while an associated wooden watchtower was constructed in 2003.

The Siargao International Surfing Cup was suspended in 2020 and 2021 due to the COVID-19 pandemic. In December 2021, Typhoon Rai (locally known as Super Typhoon Odette) destroyed the Cloud 9 boardwalk and watchtower.

By July 2022, the walkway of the Cloud 9 boardwalk had been rebuilt with funding from the Philippine Sports Commission (PSC). A three-month reconstruction of the Cloud 9 Tower took place in mid-2026 ahead of the Philippines Pro World Surf League (WSL) Championship Tour event held from October 31 to November 10, 2026.

== Venue ==
The old Cloud 9 boardwalk tower in 2014

=== Boardwalk and tower ===
The Tower of Froth is a three-storey wooden tower supported by a concrete foundation. It features a two-level viewing deck and is connected to the shore by a 150-meter (490 ft) boardwalk.

The Cloud 9 boardwalk has served as a landmark of the surf break since 1996, while the original watchtower stood from 2003 until its destruction in 2021.

=== Surfing conditions ===
Cloud 9 is a hollow, right-hand reef break. In 2001, it was reported that the lip of the wave at Cloud 9 can reach 3.66 meters (12.0 ft) high. August to November is generally considered the ideal season for surfing at Cloud 9.
