= Sinchana D. Gowda =

Indian surfer

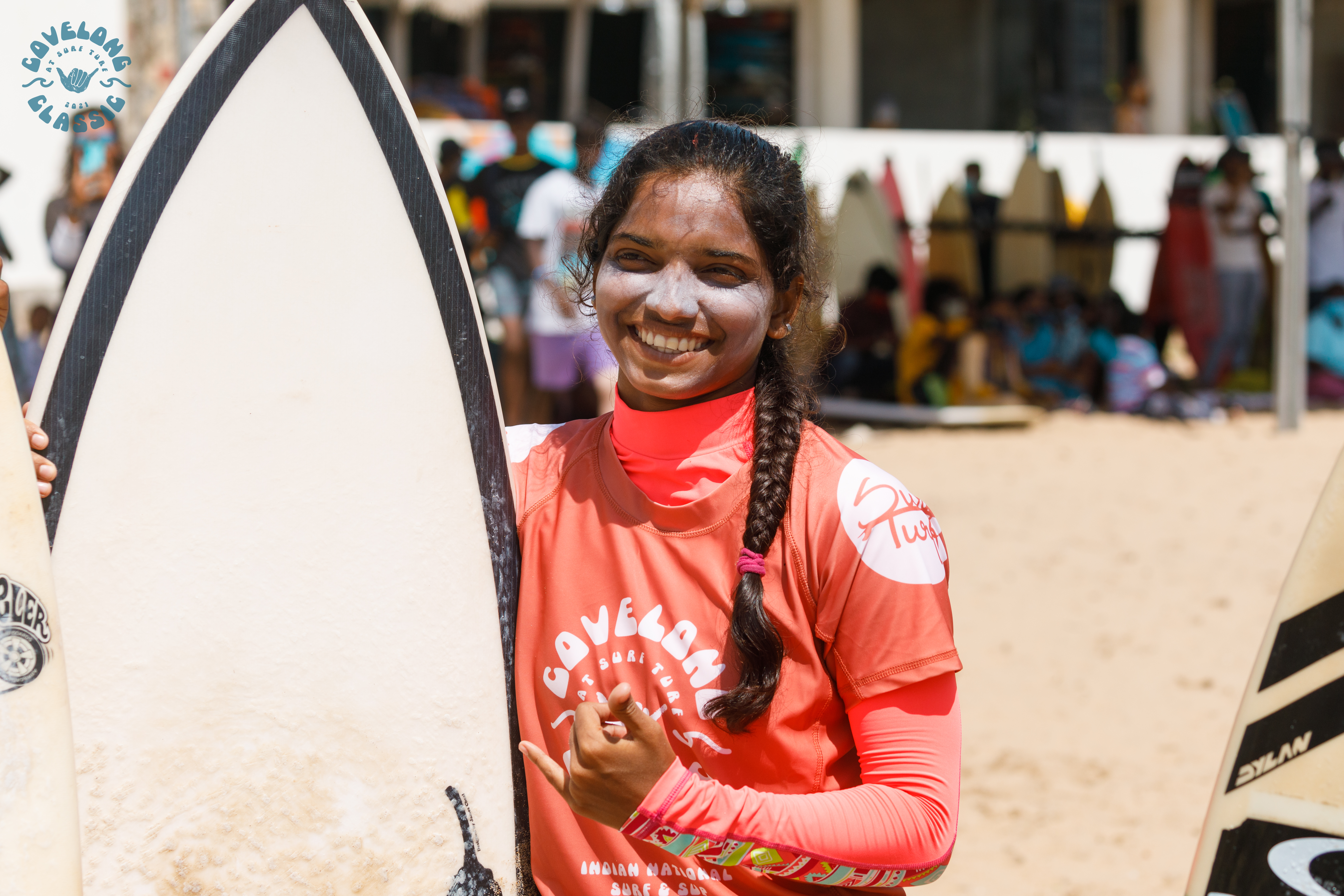
- Born: Puttur, Karnataka, India
- Occupation: Surfer
- Known for: Second International surfing champion.

Sinchana D. Gowda, or Sinchana Gowda, is an Indian surfer born in Puttur, Karnataka. She has taken part in national and international surfing tournaments. Among the awards she has won in competitive surfing, there are a second place in the women's division at the 2014 Covelong Point Classic and two national level wins in 2015, as well as victory in the women's open division at the 2018 Covelong Point Surf.Music.Yoga Festival.

== Personal life ==
In 2021, Gowda was pursuing a Bachelor of Commerce degree at a college in Puttur and considering postgraduate studies in business administration.

== Early life and career ==
Gowda hails from Puttur in Karnataka. Prior to engaging in surfing, she practiced swimming and trained under Partha Varanashi. She was introduced to surfing in 2012 when Dhruva Das of the Mantra Surf Club paid her training group of swimmers a visit and demonstrated how to surf. Varanashi and Das later took her to Bekal Fort where she had her initial experience of surfing.

She trained at the Mantra Surf Club for four years before transferring to the Mangalore Surf Club. During her early days of training, she underwent swimming and surfing training at the coast of Karnataka. It was reported in 2014 that Gowda and another surfer, Aneesha Nayak, trained under Dhruva Das of the Mantra Surf Club.

Gowda won second place in the women's division of the Covelong Point Classic, an international surfing championship conducted in Chennai with the license of the International Surfing Association, in September 2014. Aneesha Nayak, another surfer from Puttur, bagged the third position in the same division. Both Gowda and Aneesha Nayak were still students at that time and they had started surfing one year before.

In 2015, Gowda emerged victorious in two national championships, Surfing Federation of India Covelong Point Classic and Mahabs Surf Classic. She had reportedly been training under the Surfing Federation of India at that point in time and had been training with the Stoked Surfers Club in the past.

In November 2016, Gowda was a winner of four successive national surfing competitions. In the Covelong Point competition organized in Chennai from 26-28 August 2016, Gowda damaged her surfboard in the quarter-final stage of the competition and borrowed another surfboard from another surfer, Aneesha Nayak. As a result, she emerged victorious in the competition and got her fourth successive national open title. Some funding initiative by members of Puttur Aquatic Club and other people enabled her to get another surfboard. At the time, she was training under the supervision of Kiran Kumar at the Mantra Surf Club, Mulky.

In August 2018, Gowda won the women's all-age open category in the sixth Covelong Point Surf.Music.Yoga Festival organized in Kovalam, near Chennai. Suhasini Damian stood second and Rebecca Davis stood third in the category.

In the Covelong Classic race held in 2021, Gowda managed to come third after Shrishti Selvam and Sugar Banarse. She participated in the Asian Surfing Championships, which were organized in India, where she reached the semi-final stage.

== Competition results ==
Year	Competition	Category	Result	Other podium finishers
2014	Covelong Point Classic	Women's surfing	2nd	1st: Suhasini Damian; 3rd: Aneesha Nayak.
2015	Mahabs Surf Classic	Surfing	1st	Won one of two national-level championships reported for her in 2015.
2015	Covelong Point Classic	Women's surfing	1st	2nd: Suhasini Damian; 3rd: Aneesha Nayak.
2016	Covelong Point Surf, Yoga and Music Festival	Surfing	Quarter-final stage	Her surfboard broke during the quarter-finals.
2016	All Cargo Indian Open of Surfing	Women's surfing	1st	2nd: Chinamyee Mayya; 3rd: Tanvi J.
2016	All Cargo Indian Open of Surfing	Women's stand-up paddling	3rd	1st: Tanvi J; 2nd: Vilassini Sundar.
2017	Covelong Point Surf, Music and Yoga Festival	Women's (All Age – Local)	2nd	1st: Suhasini Damian; 3rd: Vilassini Sundar.
2018	Covelong Point Surf, Music and Yoga Festival	Women's (All Age Open)	1st	2nd: Suhasini Damian; 3rd: Rebecca Davis.
2019	Covelong Point Surf, Music and Yoga Festival	Women's surfing	3rd	1st: Vilasini; 2nd: Jane Von.
2021	Covelong Classic	Women's Open	3rd	1st: Shrishti Selvam; 2nd: Shanti Banarse.
2022	Indian Open of Surfing	Women's Open	3rd	1st: Sugar Banarse; 2nd: Srishti Selvam.
2023	Indian Open of Surfing	Women's Open	3rd	1st: Kamali Moorthy; 2nd: Sugar Banarse.
