= Surfing Federation of India =

National governing body of surfing

- Sport: Surfing
- Jurisdiction: India
- Abbreviation: SFI
- Affiliation: International Surfing Association
- Regional affiliation: Asian Surfing Federation
- (India)

The Surfing Federation of India is the national governing body for surfing in India. SFI is recognized by the International Surfing Association and Asian Surfing Federation. Since 2021, Arun Vasu is SFI's president.

== History ==
Surfing Federation of India, formerly Surfing India Association, was initiated by a group of surfers from India's first surf community called Mantra Surf Club Mulki, Karnataka, South India. SFI initiated India's first surf camp at Mulki in 2011, which was organized by Bay of Life Surf School, Chennai and oversaw India's first Surf festival at Orissa. SFI organised India's first international Surf and Sup Competition in Kovalam Beach, Trivandrum between May 3–5, 2013. Jonty Rhodes, cricketer and a great surfer was the chief guest at the event.

== State associations ==
The state associations are Karnataka Surfing Association (KSA), Odisha Surfing Association (OSA), and Surfing and Water Sports Association of Tamil Nadu (SWAT).
