= Uruguayan Surfing Union =

Surfing federation

- Unión de Surf del Uruguay
- Sport: surfing
- Jurisdiction: Uruguay
- Abbreviation: USU
- Founded: 1990
- Affiliation: International Surfing Association
- Headquarters: La Barra, Maldonado
- Chairman: Federico Deal
- (Uruguay)

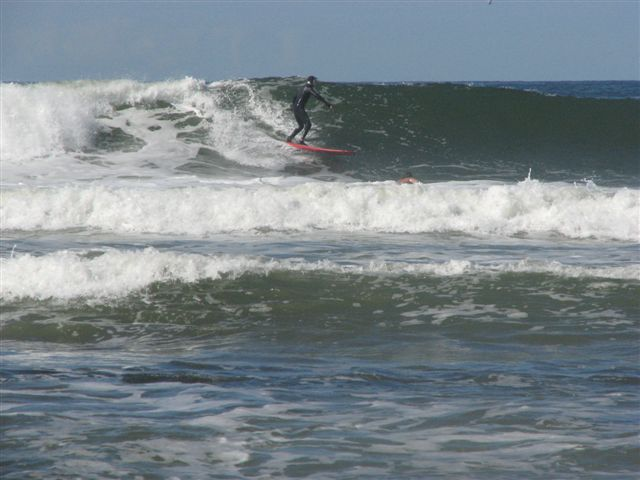
Surfing the waves at Playa Brava, Punta del Este, Uruguay. April 2010.

The Uruguayan Surfing Union (Spanish: Unión de Surf del Uruguay) is the national governing body for surfing in Uruguay.

The Uruguayan Surfing Union was founded in 1990. It has been recognized by the International Surfing Association and the Comité Olímpico Uruguayo.
