= International Surfing Association =

International sport governing body

- Sport: Surfing
- Jurisdiction: International
- Membership: 117 member federations
- Abbreviation: ISA
- Founded: 18 May 1964; 62 years ago
- Headquarters: San Diego, U.S.
- President: Fernando Aguerre (ARG)

Official website
- www.isasurf.org

The International Surfing Association (ISA) is the world governing authority for surfing, SUP racing, SUP surfing, para surfing, bodyboarding and all other wave riding activities. The ISA is recognized by the International Olympic Committee.

After the 2022 Russian invasion of Ukraine, the ISA banned athletes and officials from Russia from ISA events, and said the ISA would not stage events in Russia.

== History ==
The ISA was founded on 18 May 1964 and was originally named the International Surfing Federation (ISF) between 1964 and 1973. An Open Division World Championships has been contested biennially since 1964, a Junior World Championships since 1980, a Masters World Championships since 2007 and a Stand Up Paddle World Championship since 2011.

=== Recognition as governing body of surfing ===
In 1982 the SportAccord, formerly known as General Association of International Sports Federations (GAISF), recognized the ISA as the world's governing body of surfing. In 1995 the International Olympic Committee granted the ISA provisional recognition. ISA was admitted into the Olympic movement at 1997 when the recognition was confirmed by the IOC.

International Surfing Association (ISA) is a Member of:

- Association of IOC Recognised International Sports Federations (ARISF)
- SportAccord formerly known as General Association of International Sports Federations (GAISF)
- International World Games Association (IWGA)
- World Anti-Doping Agency

== Mission ==
The ISA's mission is to make a better world through surfing, which it does through crowning World Champions, surf and SUP instructor certification, worldwide membership, grassroots development, and annual scholarships awarded to surfers in need.

== Members ==
- Asian Surfing Federation
- European Surfing Federation

== Olympic Surfing ==
=== Olympic Bid ===
The organizing committee for the 2020 Games in Tokyo announced on 22 June 2015 that surfing was among the sports shortlisted for inclusion at the 2020 Summer Olympics. On 3 August 2016, during the 129th IOC Session at the Rio de Janeiro 2016 Olympic Games, the IOC unanimously voted to include five new sports, among them surfing, to the sports program of the Tokyo 2020 Games.

Surfing was included in the Tokyo 2020 Games on a one-off basis, and the ISA now has shifted their focused towards securing surfing's inclusion in the next editions of the Olympics, including Paris 2024 and LA 2028.

=== Olympic Qualification Process ===
On 16 March 2018, the International Surfing Association (ISA) welcomed the release by the International Olympic Committee (IOC) of the approved qualification system for Surfing's Olympic debut at Tokyo 2020, ensuring the participation of the world's best professional surfers as well as promoting universal opportunities for surfers from around the world at the Games.

The key elements of the qualification system are as follows:

- 20 men, 20 women.
- Maximum of 2 surfers per gender per National Olympic Committee (NOC).
- Qualification spots will be earned on an individual basis, by name.
- In accordance with IOC guidelines, the qualification events have been determined in hierarchical order of qualification, as further explained below; If two surfers of a gender have qualified through the first hierarchical order, that NOC will not be able to qualify more surfers of that gender through qualifying events lower in hierarchical order.
- All surfers selected by their respective National Federations for their national teams must participate in 2019 and 2021 ISA World Surfing Games in order to be eligible for Olympic qualification. The final details of the eligibility requirements are still under review by the ISA and the IOC.

The hierarchical order of qualification are as follows:

1. 2019 World Surf League Championship Tour: First 10 eligible men and first 8 eligible women.
2. 2021 ISA World Surfing Games: First 4 eligible men and first 6 eligible women.
3. 2019 ISA World Surfing Games: 4 men and 4 women selected based on their continent. Top finishing eligible surfer of each gender from Africa, Asia, Europe and Oceania.
4. 2019 Pan American Games: First eligible man and first eligible woman in the surfing competitions.
5. Host nation slot: One man and one woman slot will be guaranteed for the host nation of Japan, unless already filled through the above hierarchies. Should athletes from Japan qualify regularly, their slots will be reallocated to the highest ranked eligible surfers from the 2021 World Surfing Games.

To see the full Qualification Process for Surfing in the Tokyo 2020 Olympics, click here.

== ISA World Events ==
The ISA runs world events across all disciplines of surfing. ISA world events include:

- ISA World Surfing Games
- ISA World Junior Surfing Championship
- ISA World SUP and Paddleboard Championship
- ISA World Adaptive Surfing Championship
- ISA World Longboard Surfing Championship
- ISA World Bodyboard Championship
- ISA World Masters Surfing Championship
- ISA World Kneeboard Championship

=== ISA World Surfing Games ===
The ISA World Surfing Games is an Olympic style team competition that gathers National Delegations from around the world. Each team can field up to three men and three women. The surfers compete for individual medals and the coveted Fernando Aguerre World Team Trophy, named for and donated by the ISA President.

The event was first held in 1964 in Manly, Australia under the name 'ISA World Surfing Championships.'

Stemming from the global growth of Surfing spurred by inclusion in the Olympic Games, the 2017 edition of the ISA World Surfing Games broke the record for country participation. The previous record was set in 1996 when 36 nations graced the shores of Huntington Beach, USA, but in Biarritz 47 countries competed, shattering the record.

Many nations had representation in the event for the first time in history in 2017, including Afghanistan, China, Chinese Taipei, Greece, Senegal and South Korea.

ISA World Surfing Games Team Gold Medalists 2009 - 2019
Year	Gold Medal Country	Event location
2019	Brazil	Miyazaki, Japan
2018	Japan	Tahara, Japan
2017	France	Biarritz, France
2016	Peru	Jacó, Costa Rica
2015	Costa Rica	Popoyo, Nicaragua
2014	Peru	Punta Rocas, Peru
2013	South Africa	Playa Santa Catalina, Panama
2011	Australia	Playa Venao, Panama
2010	Peru	Punta Hermosa, Peru
2009	USA	Playa Hermosa, Costa Rica

ISA World Surfing Games Gold Medalists 2013-2019
Year	Division	Athlete	Country
2019	Open Men	Italo Ferreira	BRA
2019	Open Women	Sofía Mulánovich	PER
2018	Open Men	Santiago Muñiz	ARG
2018	Open Women	Sally Fitzgibbons	AUS
2017	Open Men	Jhony Corzo	MEX
2017	Open Women	Pauline Ado	FRA
2016	Open Men	Leandro Usuna	ARG
2016	Open Women	Tia Blanco	USA
2015	Open Men	Noe Mar McGonagle	CRC
2015	Open Women	Tia Blanco	USA
2014	Open Men	Leandro Usuna	ARG
2014	Open Women	Anali Gomez	PER
2013	Open Men	Shaun Joubert	RSA
2013	Open Women	Dimity Stoyle	AUS

=== ISA World Junior Surfing Championship ===
The ISA hosted its first World Junior Surfing Championship in 1980 in Biarritz, France, where legendary surfer Tom Curren became the first ISA World Junior Champion, helping to launch his successful career. The event was held as a division of the ISA World Surfing Games until 2003, when it was held as a stand-alone event for the first time in Durban, South Africa.

Historically, the ISA World Junior Surfing Championship has served as a glimpse into the future stars of the sport. Past ISA World Junior Champions include the 2014 WSL Champion Gabriel Medina (BRA, 2010), Tatiana Weston-Webb (HAW, 2014, 2013), Filipe Toledo (BRA, 2011), Tyler Wright (AUS, 2010, 2009), Alejo Muniz (BRA, 2008), Laura Enever (AUS, 2008), Sally Fitzgibbons (AUS, 2007), Julian Wilson (AUS, 2006), Owen Wright (AUS, 2006), Stephanie Gilmore (AUS, 2005, 2004), Matt Wilkinson (AUS, 2004), Jordy Smith (RSA, 2003) and Leonardo Fioravanti (ITA, 2015).

ISA World Junior Surfing Championship Team Gold Medalists
Year	Gold Medal Country	Event location
2017	USA	Hyuga, Japan
2016	France	Azores, Portugal
2015	USA	Oceanside, California, US
2014	Hawaii	Salinas, Ecuador
2013	Australia	Playa Jiquiliste, Nicaragua
2012	Hawaii	Playa Venao, Panama

=== ISA World Adaptive Surfing Championship ===
The ISA World Adaptive Surfing Championship was created to give surfers with physical challenges an opportunity to compete and display their talents in a Paralympic-style, world-class competition.

The event has experienced unprecedented growth since the inaugural edition in 2015. The World Championship has spurred growth of the sport around the world, with nations such as France, Australia, Chile, Brazil, USA, Hawaii and South Africa holding National Championships of their own to select their National Teams to bring to California.

The 2017 edition shattered participation records with 109 athletes from 26 countries, more than a 50% increase from the inaugural edition of the event in 2015.

=== ISA World SUP and Paddleboard Championship ===
The ISA World SUP and Paddleboard Championship is an Olympic-style, team competition that combines the disciplines of SUP Surfing, SUP Racing and Paddleboard Racing. The athletes compete for individual gold medals and the Club Waikiki-Peru ISA World Team Champion Trophy awarded to the team that wins the gold medal.

The 2017 edition of the event was the first to feature gender equality across all divisions, reflective of the rapid growth of women's SUP racing and surfing.

== Authority and Development of StandUp Paddle (SUP) ==
The ISA is one of two organizations that oversees global StandUp Paddle competitions; the other is Paddle Worldwide.

Through development programs, scholarships for young SUP athletes, and promoting Championships at the national level, SUP has experienced explosive growth under the ISA's guidance, which can be observed in the participation levels seen in the World Championship that have nearly quadrupled since its inception.

The ISA presented both Surfing and SUP to the Tokyo 2020 Organizing Committee for inclusion in the Olympic Sports Program. Tokyo 2020 only elected Surfing to be included in the Games and not SUP, however achievements such as inclusion in the 2019 Pan American Games and 2017 Central American Games have added momentum to the ISA's push for inclusion in the 2024 Olympics.

== Executive committee ==
The ISA Executive Committee is composed of the ISA President, ISA Executive Director and four Vice Presidents. Its mission is to define ISA strategies and plans of action, “For a Better Surfing Future.” The executive committee works with the ISA staff throughout the year to develop future plans.

Current Executive Committee (as of April 2018):

- President - Fernando Aguerre (ARG)
- Executive Director - Robert Fasulo (USA)
- Vice President - Karin Sierralta (PER)
- Vice President - Kirsty Coventry (ZIM)
- Vice President - Casper Steinfath (DEN)
- Vice President - Barbara Kendall (NZL)

== ISA Athletes' Commission ==
On 24 April 2018 the ISA announced the formation of a new Athletes’ Commission to ensure that athletes’ opinions are heard at the highest level of governance in Surfing, StandUp Paddle (SUP), and all surf-related disciplines.

France's Justine Dupont, who has medaled across three ISA disciplines (Shortboard, Longboard, and SUP), has been appointed the Chair of the commission. Dupont earned Team Gold at the 2017 ISA World Surfing Games and individual Silver in SUP Surfing at the 2017 ISA World SUP and Paddleboard Championship.

Barbara Kendall (NZL), ISA Vice President, Chair of the Association of National Olympic Committees (ANOC) Athletes’ Commission, and five-time Olympian serves as the Ex Officio of the commission.

The full ISA Athletes’ Commission consists of the following members:

Chair: Justine Dupont (FRA)

Ex Officio: Barbara Kendall (NZL)

Members:

- Dylan Lightfoot (RSA)
- Alana Nichols (USA)
- Masatoshi Ohno (JPN)
- Casper Steinfath (DEN)
- Miguel Tudela (PER)
- Ella Williams (NZL)

== Membership ==
The ISA has 103 member nations.

=== Members ===
The following table contains the ISA members:

Country	Member association
Afghanistan	Wave Riders Association of Afghanistan
Algeria	Djazair Surf Club (CSG Surf Section)
Argentina	Asociación de Surf Argentina (ASA)
Aruba	Aruba Surf Association (ARUSURF)
Australia	Surfing Australia
Austria	Austrian Surfing - Österreichischer Wellenreitverband
Bahamas	Bahamas Surfing Association (BASA)
Bangladesh	Surfing Bangladesh
Barbados	Barbados Surfing Association
Belgium	Belgian Surfing Federation
Brazil	Confederação Brasileira de Surf, CBSurf
Bulgaria	Bulgarian Extreme Water Sports Association
Canada	Canadian Surfing Association
Cape Verde	Skibo Surf Club
Cayman Islands	Cayman Islands Surfing Association
Chile	Asociacion Chilena de Surf
China	Chinese Extreme Sports Association
Chinese Taipei	Chinese Taipei Surfing Association
Colombia	Asociacion Colombiana de Surf (ACS)
Costa Rica	Federación de Surf de Costa Rica
Czech Republic	Ceska Federace Stand Up Paddle (CFSUP)
Denmark	North Atlantic Surfing Association (NASA)
Dominican Republic	Federacion Dominicana de Surf (FEDOSURF)Dubai Surfing Association
Ecuador	Federación Ecuatoriana de Surf
El Salvador	Federación Salvadoreña de Surf
England	Surfing England
Fiji	Fiji Surfing Association
Finland	Finnish SUP and Surf Federation
France	Fédération Française de Surf
Gambia	Gambia Swimming and Water Sports Association
Germany	Deutscher Wellenreit Verband (DWV)
Ghana	Ghana Surfing Association
United Kingdom	Surfing Great Britain
Greece	Greek Surfing Association
Guam	Guahan Napu Inc. (Guam Surf & Bodyboard Association)
Guatemala	Guatemala Surfing Association (ASOSURF)
Haiti	Surf Haiti
Hawaii	Hawaii Amateur Surfing Association (HASA)
Hong Kong	Hong Kong Stand Up Paddle Board Association (HKSUPBA)
Hungary	Hungarian Surf Association
India	Surfing Federation of India
Indonesia	Indonesian Surfing Association
Iran	I.R. Iran Surfing Association
Ireland	Irish Surfing Association
Israel	Israel Surfing Association
Italy	Federazione Italiana Surfing (FISURF)
Ivory Coast	Côte d'Ivoire Surfing Association
Jamaica	Jamaica Surfing Association
Japan	Nippon Surfing Association
Kiribati	Kiribati Surfing Association
South Korea	Korea Surfing Association
Latvia	Latvian Stand Up Paddle Association
Lebanon	Lebanon Surf & Sport
Liberia	Liberian Surfing Federation
Lithuania	Lithuanian Surfing Association
Madagascar	Fédération Malagasy de Surf
Malaysia	Malaysia Surfing Association
Maldives	Maldives Surfing Association
Mexico	Federación Mexicana de Surfing, A.C.
Morocco	Federation Royale Marocaine de Surf et Bodyboard (FRMSB)
Namibia	Namibia Surfing Association
Nauru	Nauru Surf Club
Nepal	Nepal National Surfing Association
Netherlands	Holland Surfing Association
New Zealand	Surfing New Zealand Inc.
Nicaragua	Nicaragua Surfing Association
Nigeria	Nigeria Surfing Federation
Norway	Norwegian Surfing Club
Panama	Asociación Panameña de Surf
Papua New Guinea	Surfing Association of Papua New Guinea
Peru	Federación Peruana de Tabla
Philippines	United Philippine Surfing Association
Poland	Polskie Stowarzyszenie Surfingu
Portugal	Federação Portuguesa de Surf
Puerto Rico	Puerto Rico Surfing Federation
Russia	Russian Surfing Federation
São Tomé and Príncipe	Canoeing and Surfing Federation of São Tomé
Scotland	Scottish Surfing Federation
Senegal	Federation Senegalaise de Surf
Sierra Leone	Sierra Leone Surfing Association
Singapore	Surfing Association Singapore
Slovakia	Slovak Surfing Association
Slovenia	Surf Zveza Slovenije
Somalia	Somali Surfing Association
South Africa	Surfing South Africa
Spain	Federeración Española de Surf
Sri Lanka	Surfing Federation of Sri Lanka
Sweden	Swedish Surfing Association
Switzerland	Swiss Surfing Association
Tahiti	Federation Tahitienne de Surf
Thailand	Surfing Thailand
Trinidad and Tobago	Surfing Association of Trinidad & Tobago
Turkey	Turkish American Sports Club
United Arab Emirates	Dubai Surfing Association
United States	USA Surfing
United States Virgin Islands	United States Virgin Islands Surfing Association
Uruguay	Unión de Surf del Uruguay (USU)
Vanuatu	Vanuatu Surfing Association
Venezuela	Federación Venezolana de Surfing
Wales	Welsh Surfing Federation

=== ISA Recognized International Surfing Organizations ===
- World Surf League (WSL), formerly known as Association of Surfing Professionals (ASP)
- Christian Surfers International (CSI)
- ALAS LATIN TOUR
- European Surfing Federation
- Pan-American Surf Association (PASA)
- Asian Surfing Federation
- Stand Up Paddle Athletes Association

=== Honorary life members ===
- Alan Atkins, Australia
- Eduardo Arena, Peru
- Jacques Hele, France
- Reginald Prytherch, United Kingdom
- Rod Brooks, Australia
- Tim Millward, South Africa

== Awards and honors ==
Somewhat in line with the tradition of the Olympic Games a gold, silver, bronze and copper medals are awarded to the 1st, 2nd, 3rd and 4th placed athletes who compete for the honor to represent their country and national colors.

== ISA 50th Anniversary World Surfing Games ==
=== Overall team results ===
1. Peru 11,402 points, (Champion Gold Medal)
2. Australia - 11,340 points, (Silver Medal)
3. Argentina - 10,922 points, (Bronze Medal)
4. Costa Rica - 9,508 points, (Copper Medal)
5. Ecuador - 8,330 points
6. South Africa - 8,268 points
7. Chile - 7,830 points
8. Puerto Rico - 6,720 points
9. Japan - 6,540 points
10. Panama - 6,400 points
11. New Zealand - 6,352 points
12. Mexico - 6,340 points
13. Uruguay - 5,760 points
14. Colombia - 5,540 points
15. Switzerland - 4,560 points
16. Scotland - 3,952 points
17. Tahiti - 3,756 points
18. Russia - 3,456 points
19. Venezuela - 2,520 points
20. Israel - 2,280 points
21. Turkey - 1,152 points
22. Dubai - 720 points

=== Open Men ===
1. . Leandro Usuna (ARG), Gold Medal
2. . Anthony Fillingim (CRI), Silver Medal
3. . Shane Holmes (AUS), Bronze Medal
4. . Nicholas Squires (AUS), Copper Medal

=== Open Women ===
1. . Anali Gomez (PER), Gold Medal
2. . Dominic Barona (ECU), Silver Medal
3. . Philippa Anderson (AUS), Bronze Medal
4. . Jessica Grimwood (AUS), Copper Medal
