= General Luna, Surigao del Norte =

Municipality in Surigao del Norte, Philippines

General Luna Cabuntog
- Municipality
- Municipality of General Luna
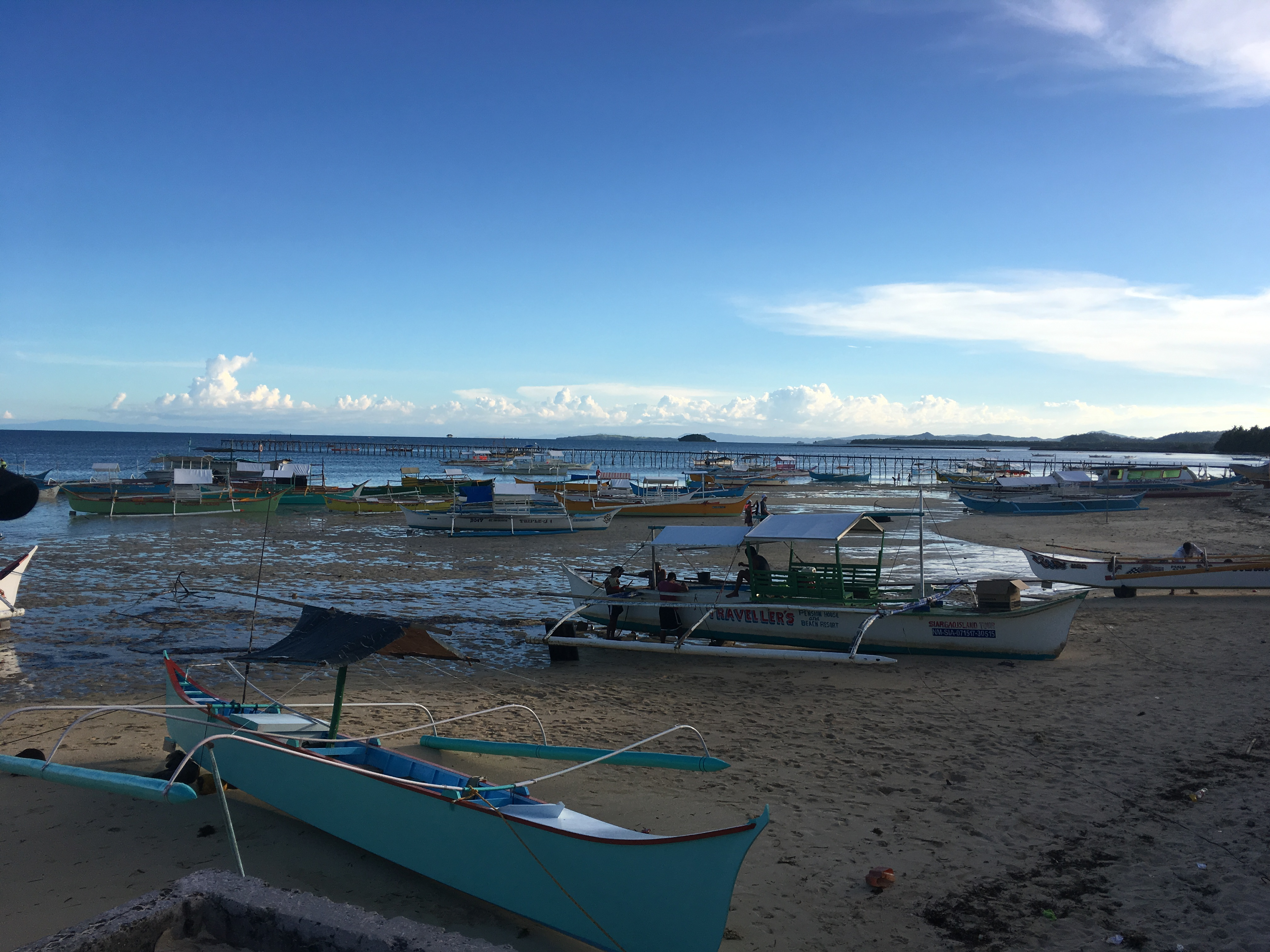

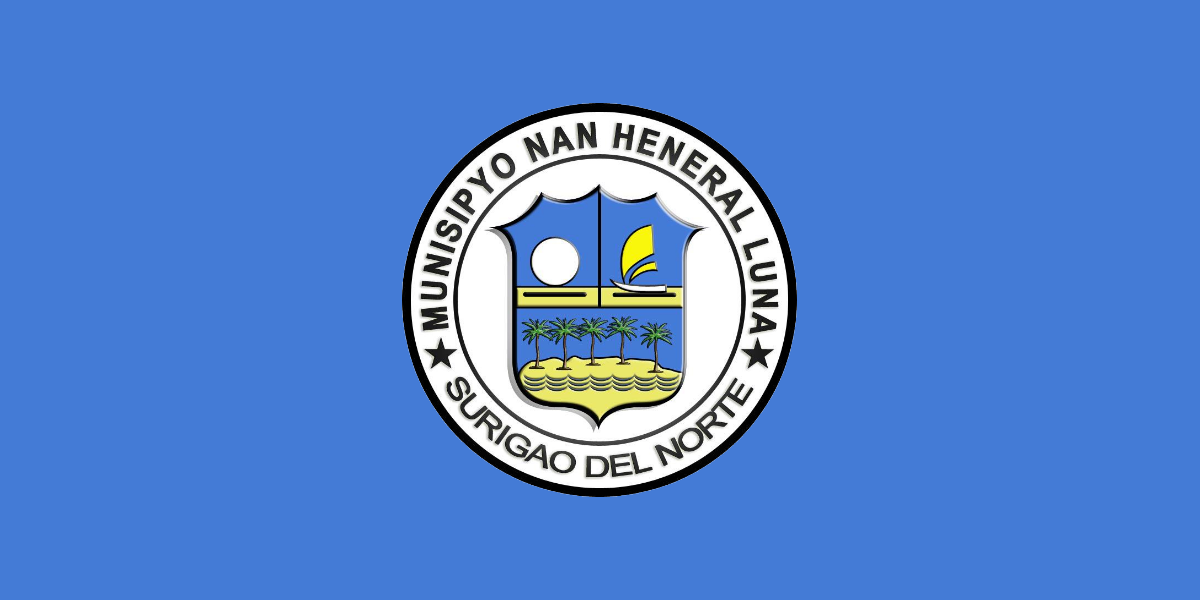
- Flag
- Nickname: Surfing Capital of the Philippines
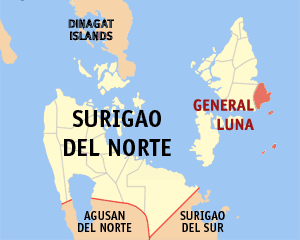
- Map of Surigao del Norte with General Luna highlighted
- Interactive map of General Luna
- Location within the Philippines
- Coordinates: 9°46′59″N 126°09′22″E
- Country: Philippines
- Region: Caraga
- Province: Surigao del Norte
- District: 1st district
- Founded: August 1, 1929
- Barangays: 19 (see Barangays)

Government
  - Type: Sangguniang Bayan
  - Mayor: Johnson Y. Sajulga (NP)
  - Vice Mayor: Romina R. Sajulga (NP)
  - Representative: Francisco T. Matugas (LAKAS) - District 1
  - Councilor: Members: May Ann A. Tokong (NP); Gina G. Kozasa (NUP); Edmon M. Antipasado (NUP); Benito C. Orozco (NP); Kerr A. Tiu (NP); John Christoper C. Silvosa (NP); Elvis E. Antipasado (LAKAS); Arnel A. Figuron (NUP)
  - Electorate: 20,658 voters (2025)

Area
  - Total: 41.30 km^{2} (15.95 sq mi)
- Elevation: 9.0 m (29.5 ft)
- Highest elevation: 280 m (920 ft)
- Lowest elevation: 0 m (0 ft)

Population (2024 census)
  - Total: 25,208
  - Density: 610.4/km^{2} (1,581/sq mi)
  - Households: 5,492

Economy
  - Income class: 3rd municipal income class
  - Poverty incidence: 12.95% (2023)
  - Revenue: ₱ 236.9 million (2024)
  - Assets: ₱ 513.6 million (2024)
  - Expenditure: ₱ 169.5 million (2024)
  - Liabilities: ₱ 238.9 million (2024)

Service provider
  - Electricity: Siargao Electric Cooperative (SIARELCO)
- Time zone: UTC+8 (PST)
- ZIP code: 8419
- PSGC: 1606710000
- IDD : area code: +63 (0)86
- Native languages: Surigaonon; Agusan; Cebuano; Tagalog
- Website: generalluna.gov.ph

General Luna, officially the Municipality of General Luna (Surigaonon: Lungsod nan General Luna; Tagalog: Bayan ng Heneral Luna), is a municipality in the province of Surigao del Norte, Philippines. According to the 2024 census, it has a population of 25,208 people.

Formerly known as Cabuntog, it is home to annual international and national surfing competitions because of the Cloud 9 waves. As a result, the town has the reputation as the "Surfing Capital of the Philippines."

== Geography ==
General Luna is located 16 kilometres (9.9 mi) east of Dapa and about 40 nautical miles (74 km; 46 mi) from Surigao City. The islands of Anahawan, Daku, and La Januza are within the municipality's jurisdiction. The area is protected within the Siargao Islands Protected Landscapes and Seascapes (SIPLAS) under Republic Act 7586 (NIPAS Act).

=== Barangays ===
General Luna is politically subdivided into 19 barangays. Each barangay consists of puroks while some have sitios.

There are 15 barangays which located in Siargao Island while 4 baranngays are on the other outer islands.

- Anajawan
- Cabitoonan
- Catangnan
- Consuelo
- Corazon
- Daku
- La Januza
- Libertad
- Magsaysay
- Malinao
- Poblacion I (Purok I)
- Poblacion II (Purok II)
- Poblacion III (Purok III)
- Poblacion IV (Purok IV)
- Poblacion V (Purok V)
- Santa Cruz
- Santa Fe
- Suyangan
- Tawin-tawin

=== Climate ===
Climate data for General Luna, Surigao del Norte
Month	Jan	Feb	Mar	Apr	May	Jun	Jul	Aug	Sep	Oct	Nov	Dec	Year
Mean daily maximum °C (°F)	29 (84)	30 (86)	30 (86)	32 (90)	33 (91)	32 (90)	32 (90)	32 (90)	32 (90)	32 (90)	31 (88)	30 (86)	31 (88)
Mean daily minimum °C (°F)	24 (75)	24 (75)	24 (75)	25 (77)	25 (77)	25 (77)	25 (77)	25 (77)	25 (77)	25 (77)	24 (75)	24 (75)	25 (76)
Average rainfall mm (inches)	466.6 (18.37)	365.2 (14.38)	251.1 (9.89)	164.7 (6.48)	128.3 (5.05)	127.5 (5.02)	135.5 (5.33)	119.3 (4.70)	180.9 (7.12)	217.0 (8.54)	335.8 (13.22)	460.3 (18.12)	2,952.2 (116.22)
Average rainy days	25	20	20	18	14	15	15	12	16	20	23	26	224
Source: World Weather Online

== Demographics ==
Population census of General Luna
Year	Pop.	±% p.a.
1903	2,388	—
1939	4,619	+1.85%
1948	5,719	+2.40%
1960	8,614	+3.47%
1970	8,476	−0.16%
1975	9,768	+2.89%
1980	12,075	+4.33%
1990	11,535	−0.46%
1995	12,554	+1.60%
2000	12,347	−0.36%
2007	13,385	+1.12%
2010	15,014	+4.27%
2015	16,771	+2.13%
2020	22,853	+6.73%
2024	25,208	+2.38%
Source: Philippine Statistics Authority

A tourist attraction known for its number of beach resorts mainly for surfing, General Luna and the rest of Siargao Island have become a melting pot of people who came from Luzon, Visayas, other parts of Mindanao and other countries. Visitors would soon become municipality's permanent residents and intermarried local inhabitants, adding its local population.

== Economy ==
Poverty incidence of General Luna (%)

Source: Philippine Statistics Authority

== Infrastructure ==
=== Roads and bridges ===
The Catangnan–Cabitoonan Bridge is a 349-meter (1,145 ft) long bridge connecting Barangays Catangnan and Cabitoonan and costing P337 million. Opened in November 2021.

=== Sports ===
Cloud 9 Boardwalk in October 2026.

General Luna has been known for being a surfing location. The annual Siargao International Surfing Cup has been held since 1996. It has been part of the World Surf League (WSL) Qualifying Series since 2014.

Off the coast of General Luna, is the Cloud 9 Tower a single-storey platform used as a venue for surfing spectators. The original structure was built in 2003 and was three-storeys tall until its destruction in 2021 by Typhoon Rai (Odette). There are plans to renovate the structure in 2026. Cloud 9 has been included in the WSL's 2026 Championship Tour.

== See also ==
- List of renamed cities and municipalities in the Philippines
