= Siargao =

Philippine island

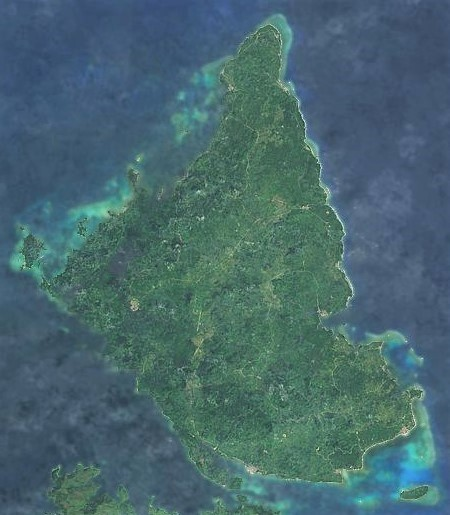
- Siargao island satellite image captured by Sentinel-2 in 2016

- Location within Philippines

Geography
- Coordinates: 9°54′18″N 126°4′0″E
- Adjacent to: Philippine Sea
- Area: 437 km^{2} (169 sq mi)
- Highest elevation: 158 m (518 ft)
- Highest point: Mount Baliuko

Administration
- Philippines
- Region: Caraga
- Province: Surigao del Norte
- Municipalities: Burgos; Dapa; Del Carmen; General Luna; Pilar; San Benito; San Isidro; Santa Monica

Demographics
- Population: 117,370 (2024)

Additional information

Siargao is a tear-drop shaped island in the Philippine Sea situated 196 kilometers southeast of Tacloban. It has a land area of approximately 437 square kilometres (169 sq mi). The east coast is relatively straight with one deep inlet, Port Pilar. The coastline is marked by a succession of reefs, small points and white, sandy beaches. The neighboring islands and islets have similar landforms. Siargao is known as the surfing capital of the Philippines, and was voted the Best Island in Asia in the 2021 Conde Nast Travelers Readers awards.

The island is within the jurisdiction of the province of Surigao del Norte in the mainland Mindanao and is composed of eight municipalities: Burgos, Dapa, Del Carmen, General Luna, San Benito, Pilar, San Isidro, and Santa Monica.

Siargao is a famous tourist destination, well known for its many surfing spots and featured in the film Siargao for such qualities. Surfing is so ingrained in the identity of Siargao, that in 2022, two political families from Surigao Del Norte traded barbs over the cancellation of a national surfing competition hosted on the island.

== Etymology ==
The name originates from Bisayan siargaw or saliargaw (Premna odorata), a mangrove species that grows on the islands.

== History ==
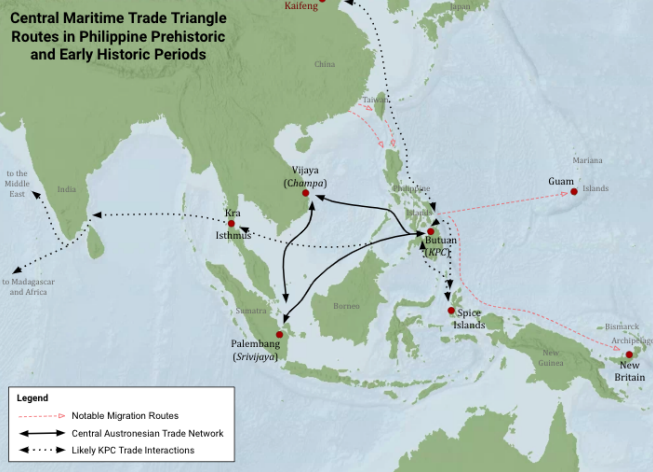
The trade network that the Kalaga Putuan Crescent had controlled across Southeast Asia, and which the Rajahnate of Butuan and Surigao-Siargao was an early capital of, before the center of the network was moved to the Rajahnate of Cebu The people of Siargao were also considered Visayans in language, and joined fellow Visayans in having participated in warfare against Yuan Dynasty China.

According to records from Song dynasty China and archeological discoveries from the Surigao Treasures, uncovering Hindu and Buddhist artifacts, Siargao was an island sitting astride rich maritime trading routes. The KPC (Kalaga Putuan Crescent) Visayan trade-alliance or Rajamandala, which was an entrepôt of: spices from Ternate, silk from China, sandalwood incense from East Timor, gold from Caraga, shipping from Indochina, and camphor from Brunei, peaked in the 1000s, and was led by the Rajahnate of Butuan just to the immediate southwest of Siargao island, but was soon eclipsed by fellow Visayan kingdoms.

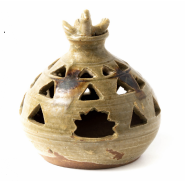
A celadon incense burner from State of Yue (Warring States Period of China) dated to the 2nd Century AD found in the vicinity of Siargao island. Incense and spices sourced directly south the maritime routes of Siargao island alongside locally mined gold from the nearby Rajahnate of Butuan was gathered and transhipped for export to China and Indochina.

Afterwards, the first recorded sighting by Europeans of Siargao Island was by Spanish navigator Bernardo de la Torre on board of the carrack San Juan de Letrán in 1543 when attempting to return from Sarangani to New Spain (Mexico). It was charted as Isla de las Palmas (Palm Island in Spanish).

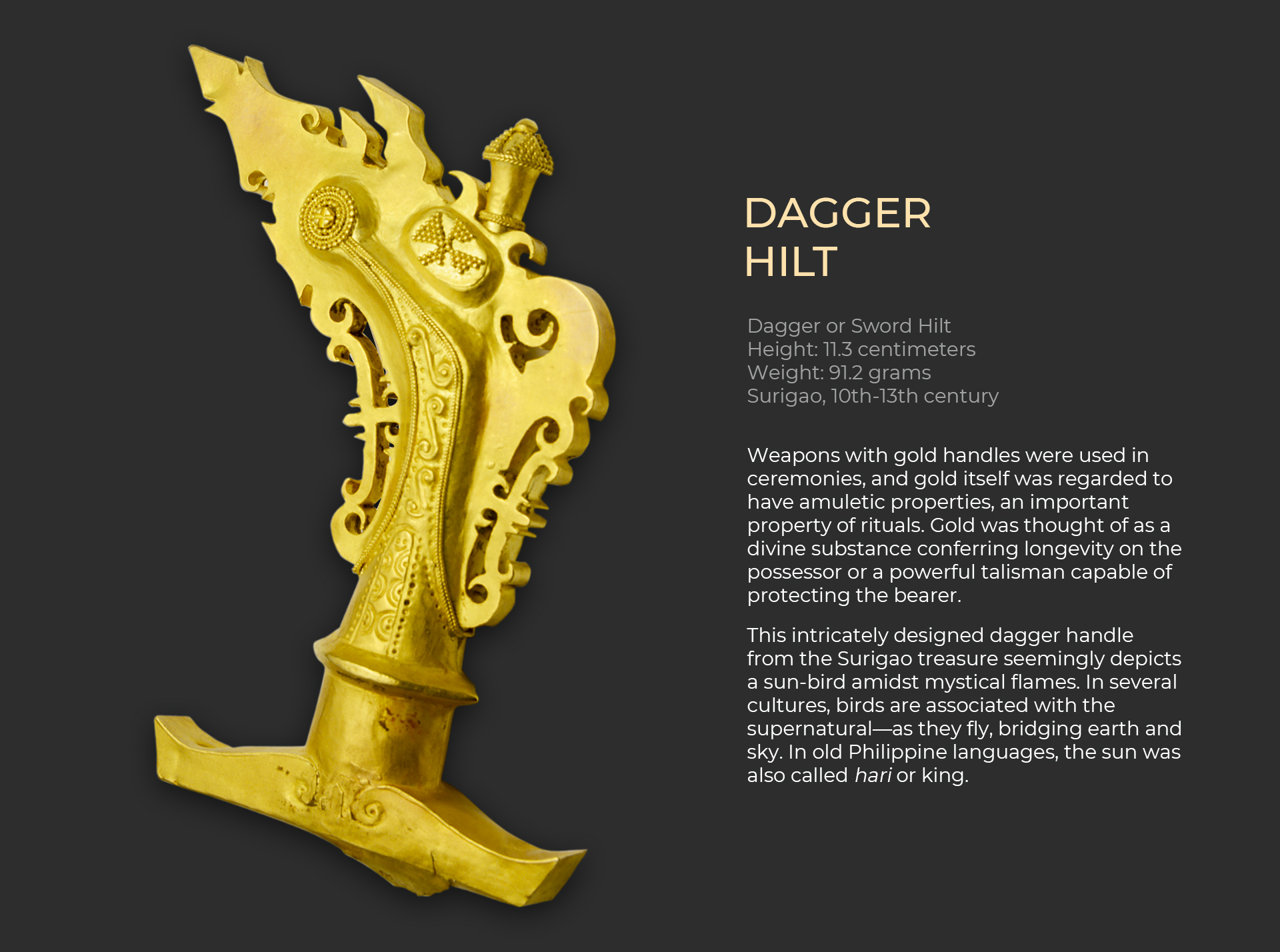
A Golden Dagger Hilt from the Surigao Treasures found in Surigao City just immediately west of Siargao.

Spanish authorities, when they incorporated Siargao, placed the island under the administration of Caraga region, they reinforced the place's defenses with Mexican soldiers and settlers who became heads of households from Mexico, in 1635 there were 45 Mexican soldier-colonists, at 1670 about 81 Mexicans soldier-colonists, and in 1672 another 81 Mexicans of the same profession. By the end of the 18th century, the area was home to 3,497 native families supported by a company of Mexican soldiers garrisoning the local forts.

In the 1818 census Surigao province alone, and it's subdivision Siargao had 2,475 native families as well as 25 Spanish families from Spain to supplement the earlier Mexican immigrants and if including the province of Butuan, also a province of Caraga, there were in total 6,178 native families and 35 Spanish-Filipino families, not counting the numerous Mexican-Filipinos who assimilated into the local population and were counted as natives.

In 2013, President Noynoy Aquino allocated transparent funds for the modernization of Siargao's airport, the first ever modern development on the island.

Siargao Island was declared a national park under Republic Act No. 11038 (Expanded National Integrated Protected Areas System Act of 2018) signed by President Rodrigo Duterte in July 2018.

On December 16, 2021, Typhoon Rai struck the area as a Category 5 super typhoon. It left the island devastated, with many buildings damaged or demolished. It caused ₱20 billion ($400 million) in damages.

On Sep 14, 2025, residents and allied groups held a peaceful one-kilometer solidarity walk at Sunset Bridge in General Luna, Surigao del Norte in protest of Israeli "settler colonization" of Siargao. The Department of Tourism remains optimistic that Siargao will continue to thrive as a popular tourist destination despite recent concerns about Israeli overtourism in the island.

== Geography ==
Siargao Island contains one of the largest mangrove forest reserves in Mindanao, covering an area of 4,871 hectares in Del Carmen. Long stretches of wetlands indicate a potential for commercial seaweed propagation. The extensive mangrove forests of the western coast in the Del Carmen area are home to the Indo-Pacific crocodile Crocodylus porosus. A large specimen measuring 14 feet 9 inches (4.50 meters) was found dead in 2016.

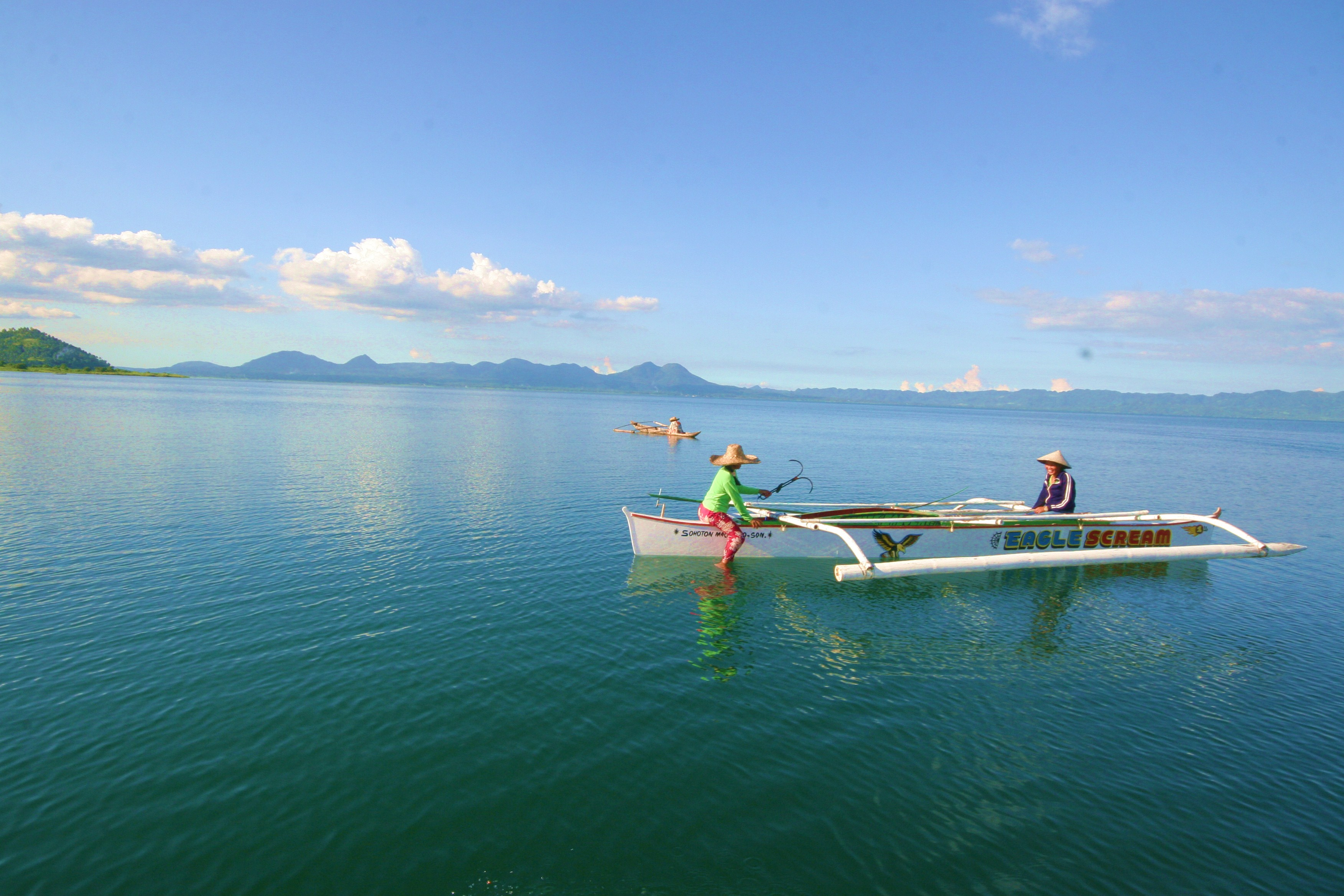
Fishermen in Siargao

Siargao Island is greatly influenced by the winds and currents coming uninterrupted from the Pacific Ocean, intensified by the Mindanao current running westward through the Siargao Strait. The tide of Siargao is diurnal with tidal curves typically present, especially on the east coast of the island.

The island's Pacific-facing reefs are situated on the edge of the Philippine Trench, and the extremely deep offshore waters assure the ocean swells have undiluted power when they encounter the many coral and rock reefs. Siargao has excellent surfing conditions, particularly during the southwest "habagat" monsoon from August to December when the prevailing wind is offshore.

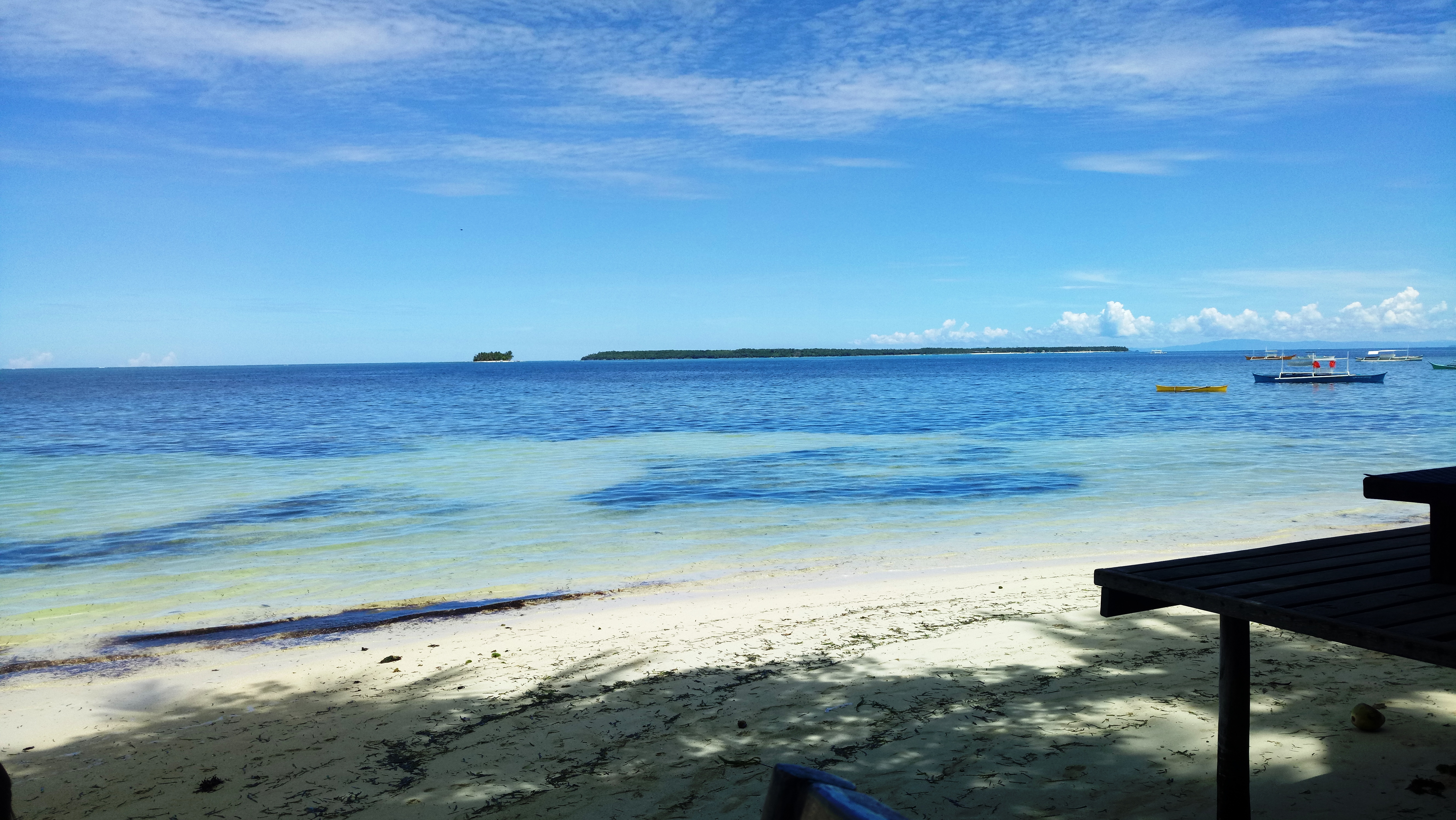
Guyam Island (left) and Daku Island (right) visible from the beach at General Luna

There are several islands located off Siargao. The islands in General Luna include Guyam Island, Pansukian or Naked Island (a sandbar), and Daku Island. These are typically included in island-hopping tours that are popular activities being offered to tourists visiting the island.

In the western coast in the municipalities of Del Carmen and San Benito are numerous islands, most of which are covered in mangrove forests. These islands include Caob, Pagbasayan, Poneas, Tona, Laonan, and Kawhagan. The tourist attractions of Sugba Lagoon and Pamomoan Beach is located in Kawhagan. The westernmost island of Siargao is Halian (under the jurisdiction of Del Carmen), located in between Siargao and the Dinagat Islands.

Off the southern end of the island are the three Bucas Grande island groups. Two of which, East Bucas Grande and Middle Bucas Grande, are part of the municipality of Dapa, while the largest island, Bucas Grande, is contiguous to the municipality of Socorro. Bucas Grande is known for the tourist attractions of Sohoton Cove, Tiktikan Lake, and the Jellyfish Sanctuary, among others.

In the past, the island could be reached via a direct domestic flight from Manila to Surigao City and then by a ferry to the coastal towns of Dapa or Del Carmen. Cebgo and other airlines have flights from Cebu and other places. In March 2017, both Cebu Pacific and SkyJet Airlines commenced direct flights to Sayak Airport (IAO) (aka "Siargao Airport") from Manila Airport (MNL), the first direct flights to the island from the capital. Philippine Airlines has been offering direct flights from Clark International Airport to Sayak Airport since July 1, 2018. There are plans to extend the runway of Sayak Airport.

=== Cloud 9 ===
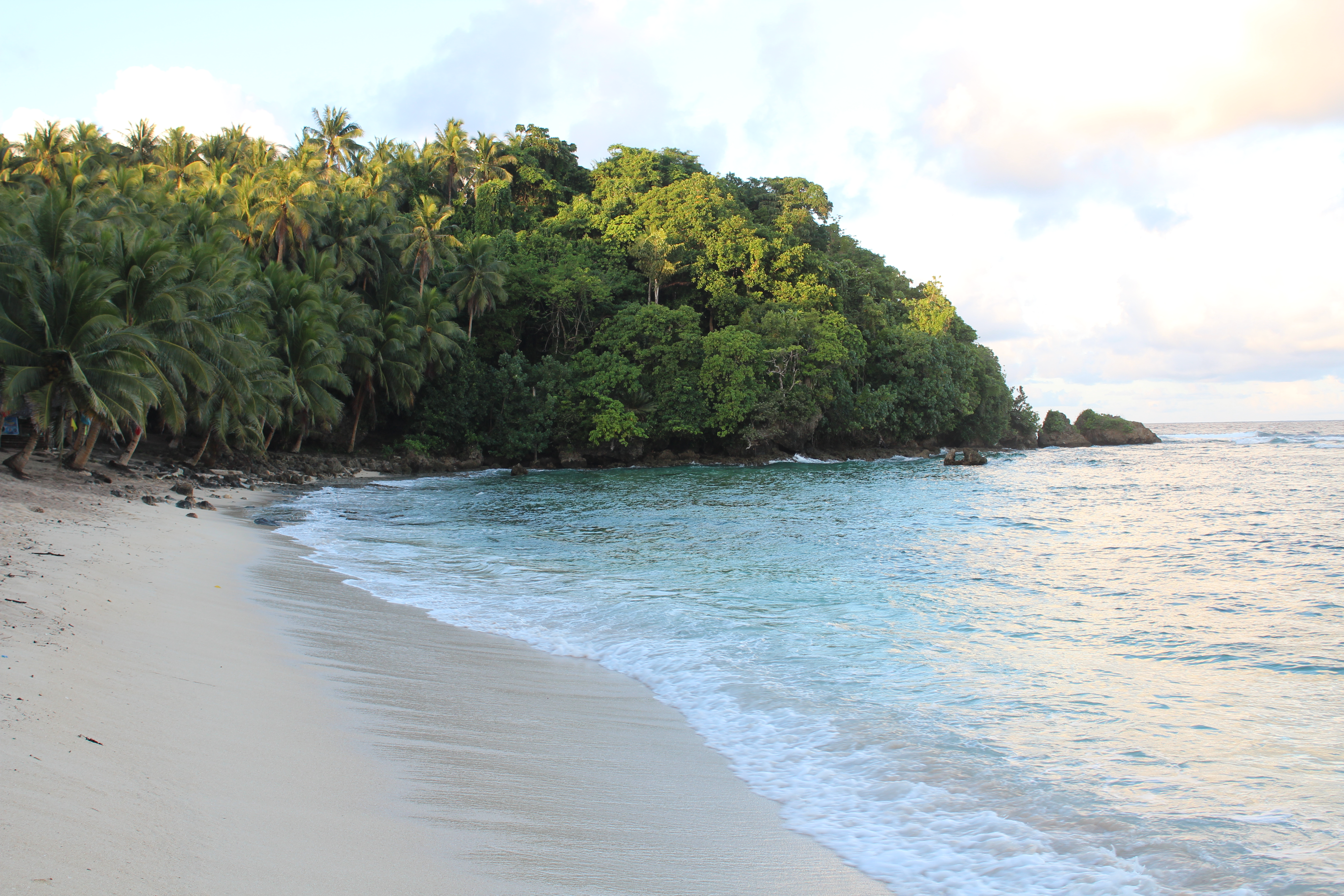
The beach at the Magpupungko Rock Pools at high tide in Pilar

One of the well-known surfing spots in Siargao and the Philippines, with a reputation for thick, hollow tubes is "Cloud 9". This right-breaking reef wave is the site of the annual Siargao Cup, a domestic and international surfing competition sponsored by the provincial government of Surigao del Norte.

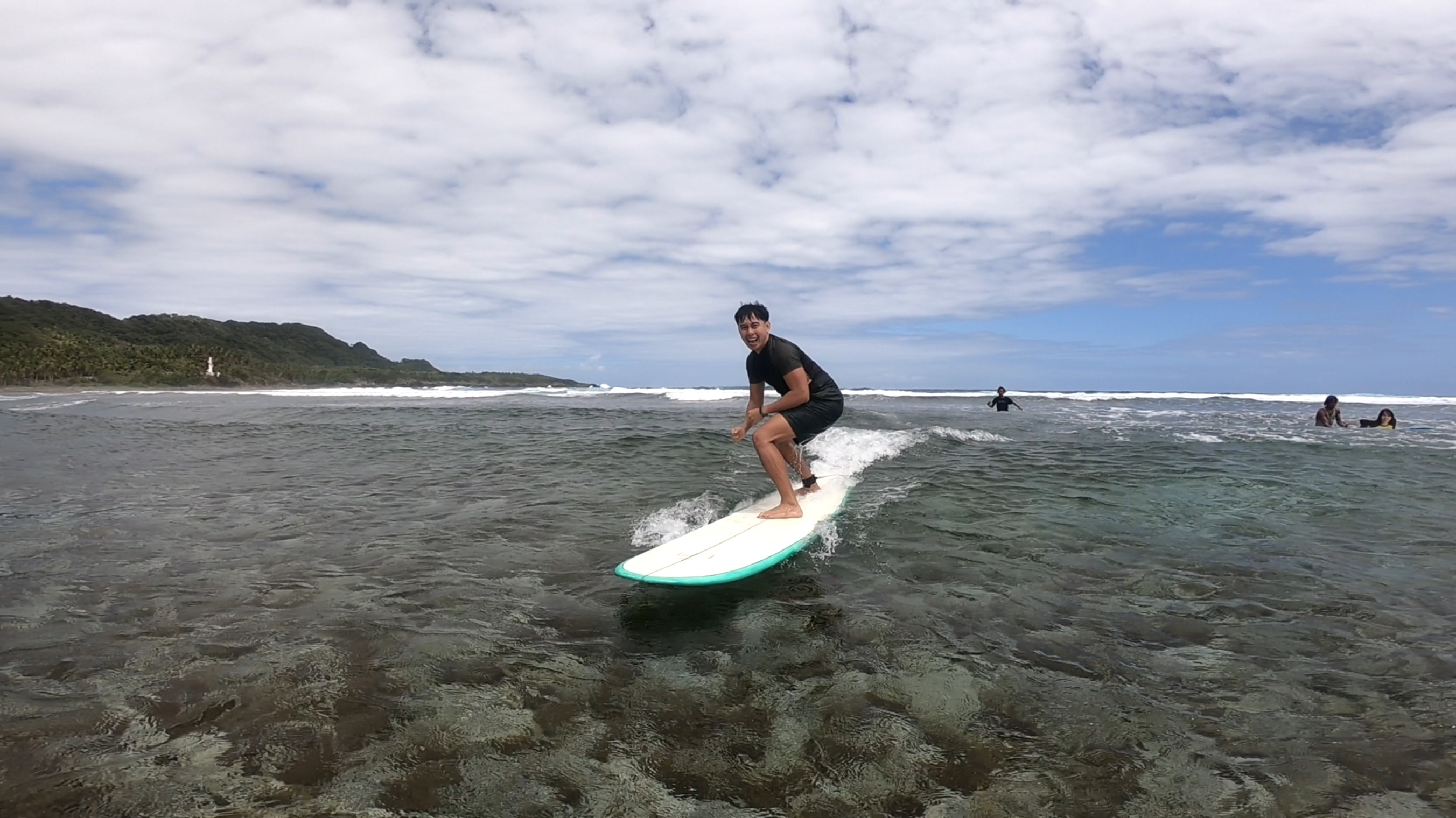
A beginner surfer in Siargao

The wave was discovered by travelling surfers in the late 1980s. The reef break was named "Cloud 9" in September 1992 by American surf photographer John Seaton Callahan after a locally sold chocolate bar. This surf trip to Siargao Island was named by Surfer as one of the "Ten Best Surf Trips of All Time" in 1995. Cloud 9 also has a reputation for being a relatively cheap destination for surfers with many accommodations, restaurants, and bars to choose from.

There are several other quality waves on Siargao and nearby islands such as Tombstones, but Cloud 9 has received more publicity than any other surf spot in the Philippines. While it is not the only wave in the Tuason Point and General Luna areas easily accessible via the long pier from the shoreline and without the need for a boat, it is easily the most popular, leading to overcrowding and the nickname of "Crowd 9" among surfers.

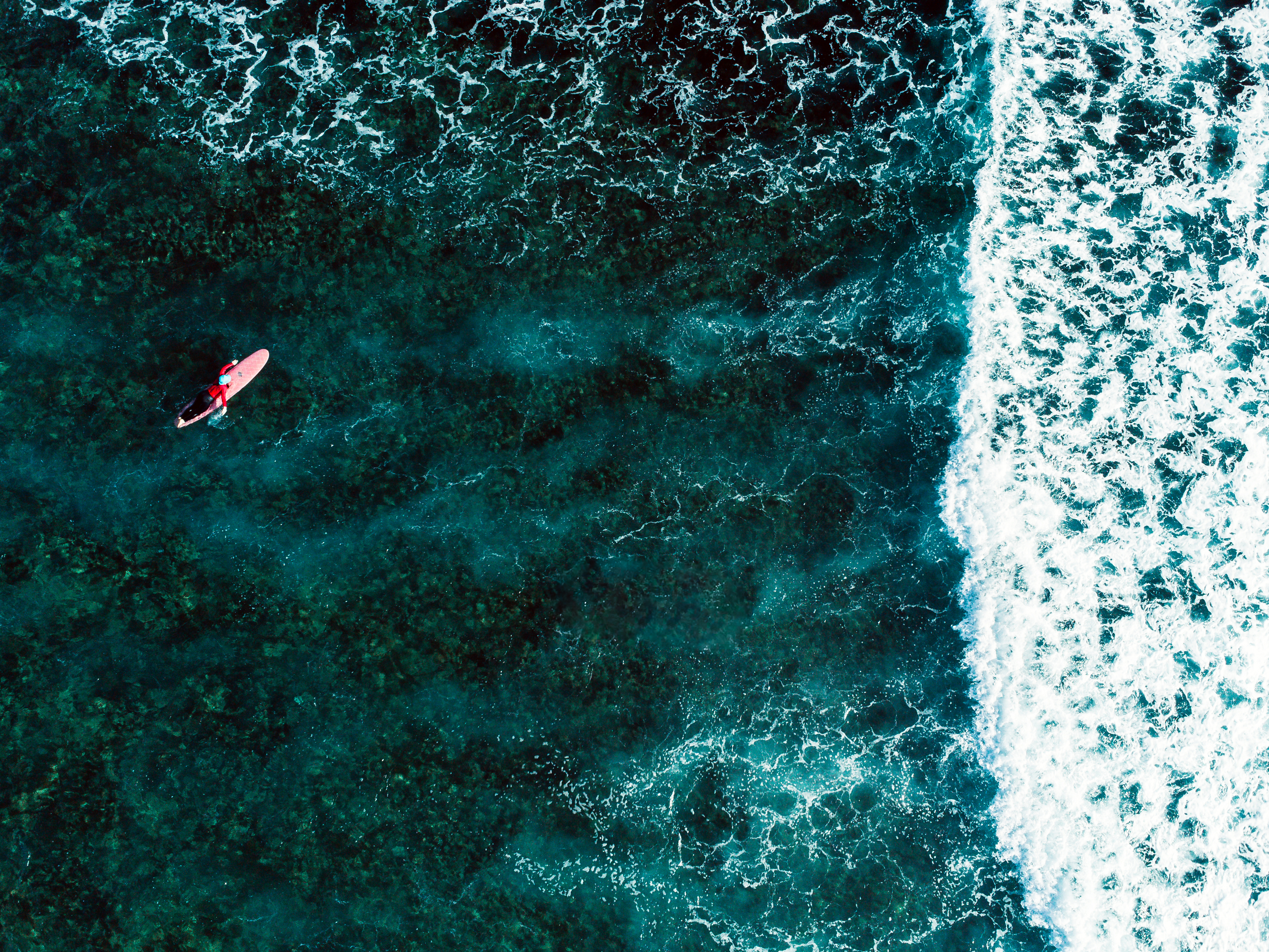
A surfer gears up for the oncoming wave in the famous Cloud 9, Siargao Island.

Siargao, particularly the municipality of General Luna and the Tuason Point area, is well known as "The Surfing Capital of the Philippines" with a reputation among surfers within the Philippines and the International scene.

== Demographics ==
Siargao Islands have approximately 150,000 inhabitants – 9 municipalities of which Dapa is the largest with 25,000 people as the municipality is also the main entry port for those who travel by ferry from Surigao City in the mainland Mindanao. General Luna has a population of 15,000 and is the main tourist destination due to its closeness to Cloud 9 and other international standard surf spots. A tourist destination, the population in Siargao consists of the native Surigaonons and non-native settlers from Luzon, Visayas and other parts of Mindanao as well as foreigners, making the islands the melting pot of people. Visiting local and international tourists would soon become Siargao's permanent residents after establishing their businesses there, adding to its local population. Among these foreign settlers, expatriates from Australia and North America (the United States and Canada), as well as European countries including Spain, France, Germany,Switzerland, the Netherlands, Italy, the United Kingdom, Ireland, Sweden, Lithuania, Norway, and Denmark, have formed a highly dense and influential community, heavily drawn by the island's prominent surf culture and eco-conscious lifestyle, while others visit primarily for tourism. Concurrently, there has been a significant and growing influx of Israeli tourists and semi-permanent residents, establishing a distinct presence on the island.

== Geology ==
The Late Cretaceous Dinagat Ophiolite is present on a northeast to southwest trend from Burgos, Santa Monica, and Santa Monica to Esperanza. The assemblage consists of amphibolite, peridotite, gabbro, and pillow basalt. Overlying the ophiolite is the Late Miocene Loreto Formation, which is a conglomerate overlain by sandstone, shale and mudstone. The conglomerate includes clasts of basalt, diabase, gabbro, peridotites, and schists. Overlying the Loreto Formation is the Pleistocene Siargao Limestone, which is a massive reef limestone.

== Awards and recognition ==
Out of the 85 destinations listed, Siargao, the surfing capital of the Philippines, is named as the best island in Asia in the annual Condé Nast Traveler (CNT) readers' choice awards for top islands to visit this 2021.

== In popular culture ==
Siargao is the primary location of the film Siargao (2017) directed by Paul Soriano under his production company, Ten17P.

== Gallery ==
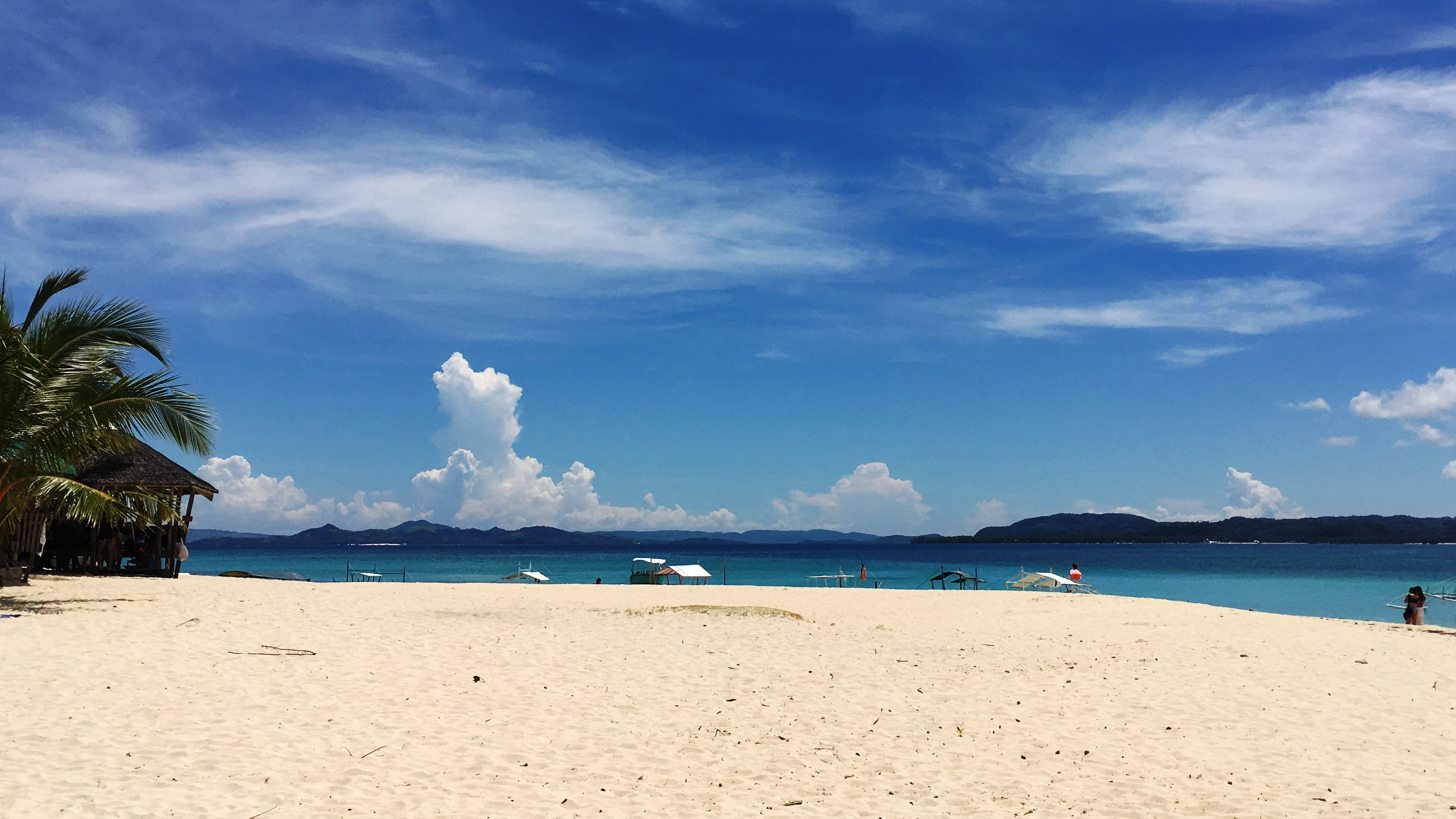
The beach at Daku Island off General Luna

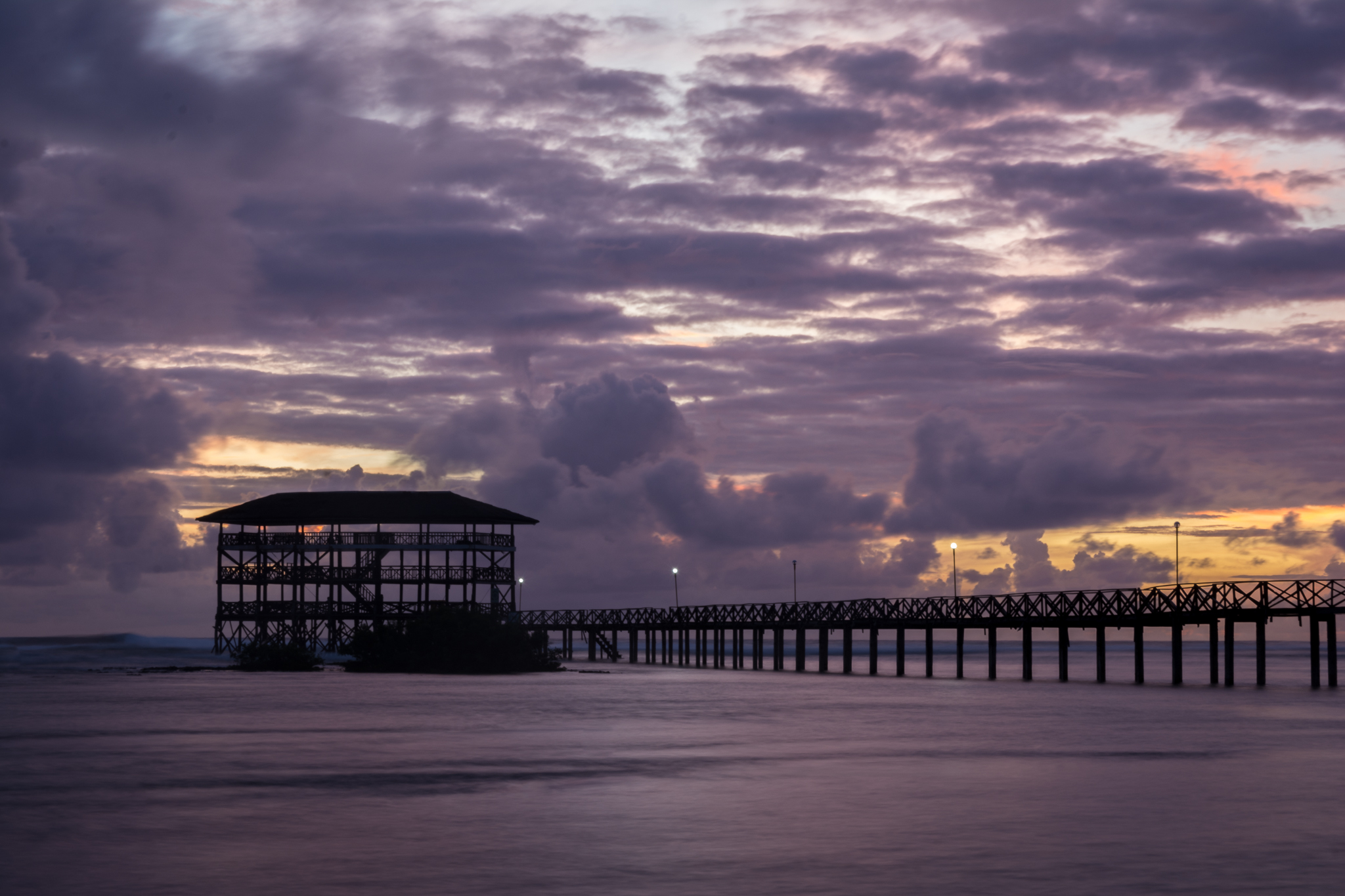
Cloud 9 Boardwalk in General Luna

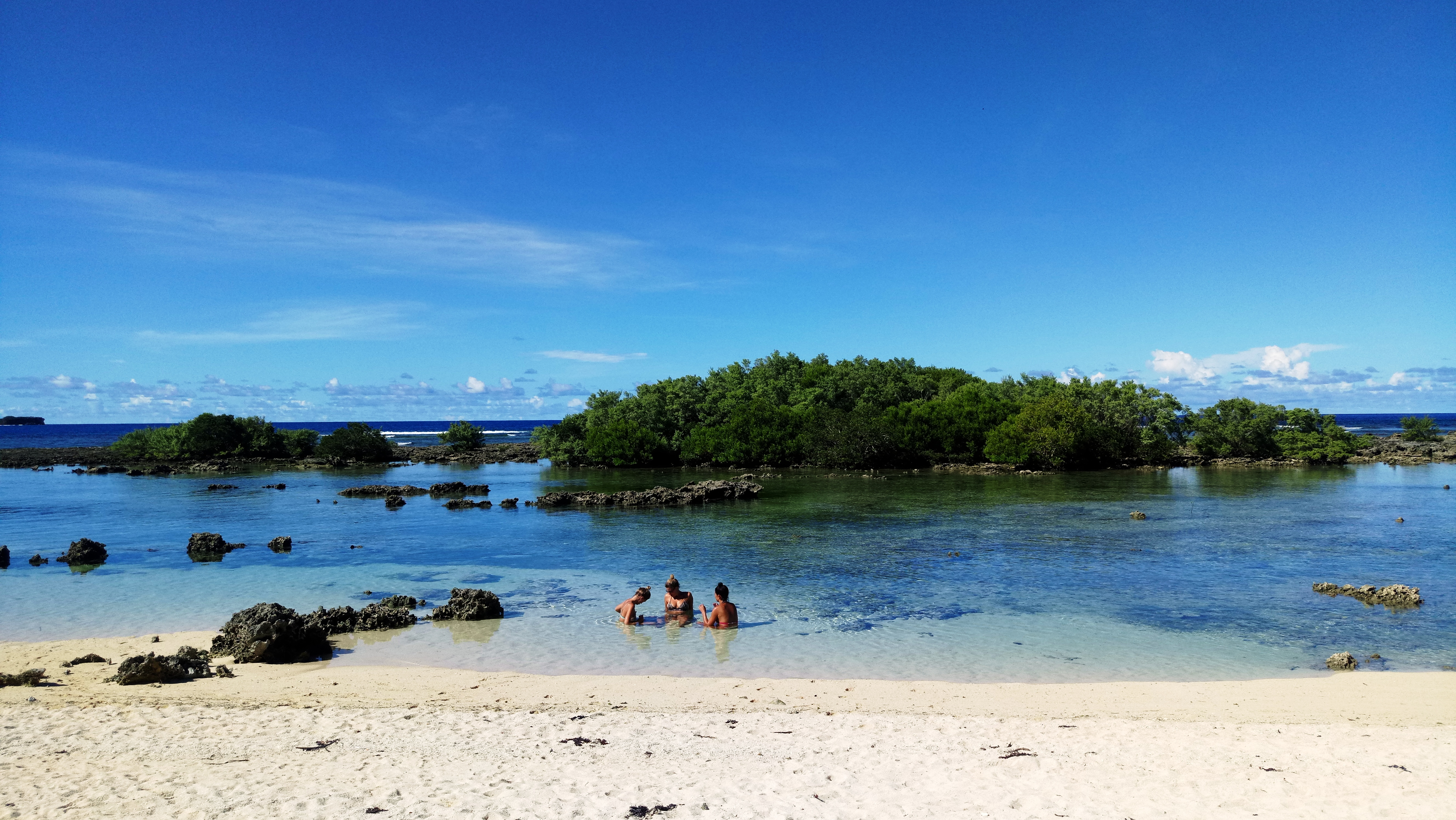
Doot Beach (also known as "Secret Beach") in Dapa

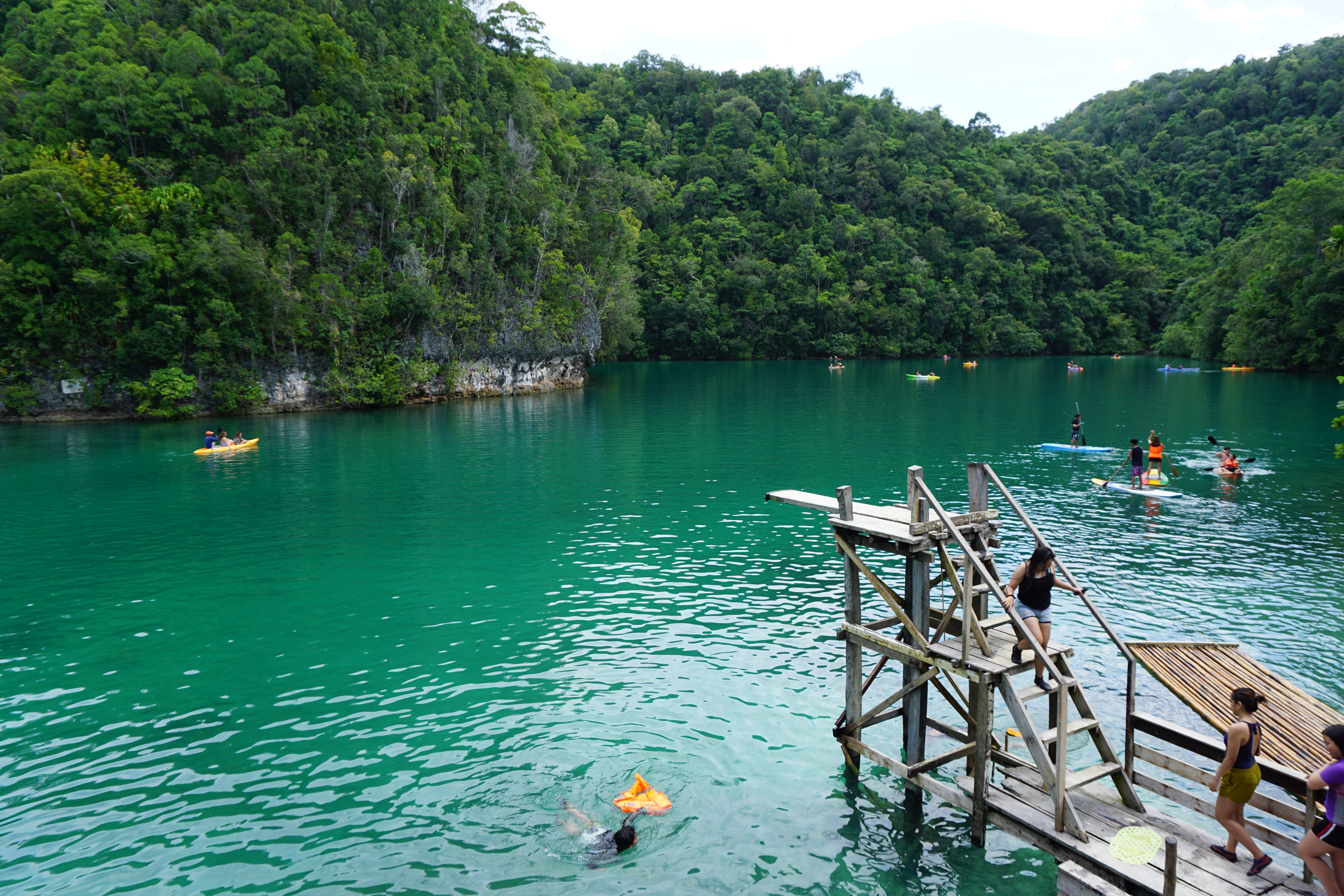
Sugba Lagoon in Kawhagan Island, Del Carmen

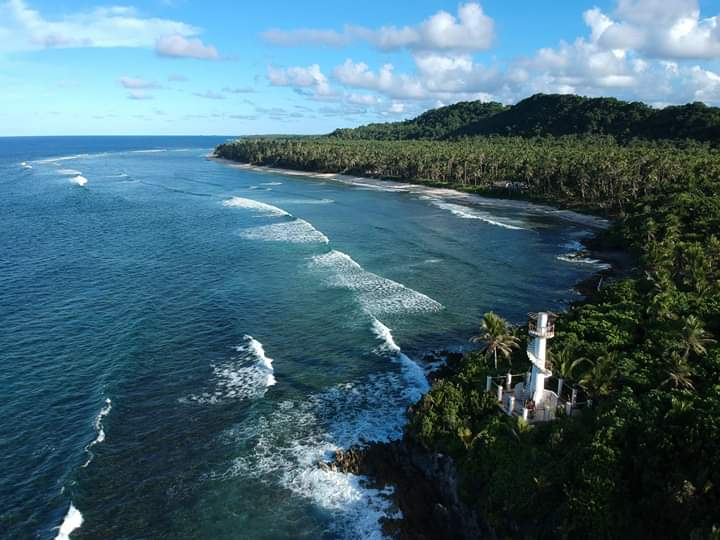
Old lighthouse at Pacifico Beach in San Isidro

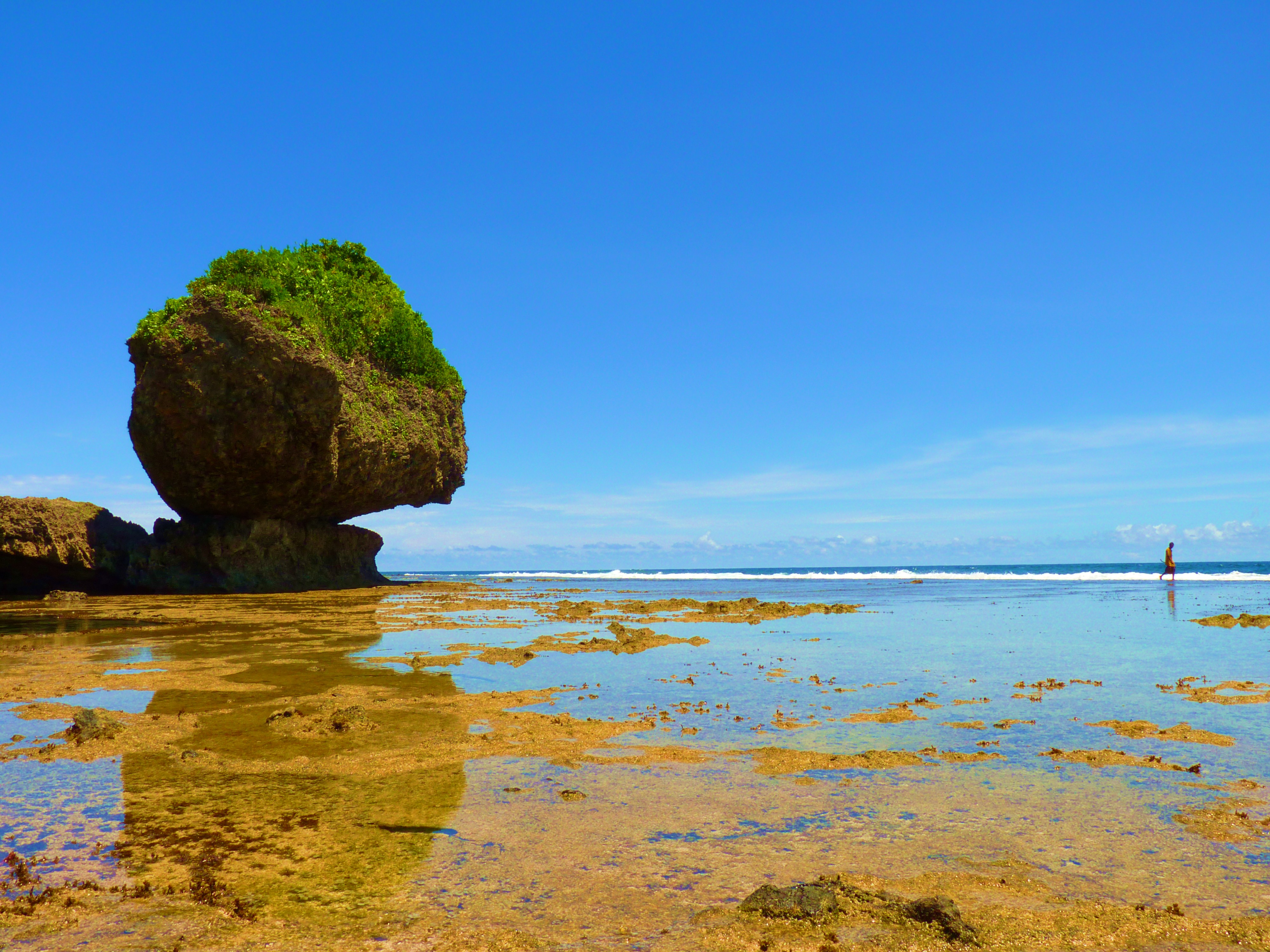
Magpupungko Rock Pools in Pilar

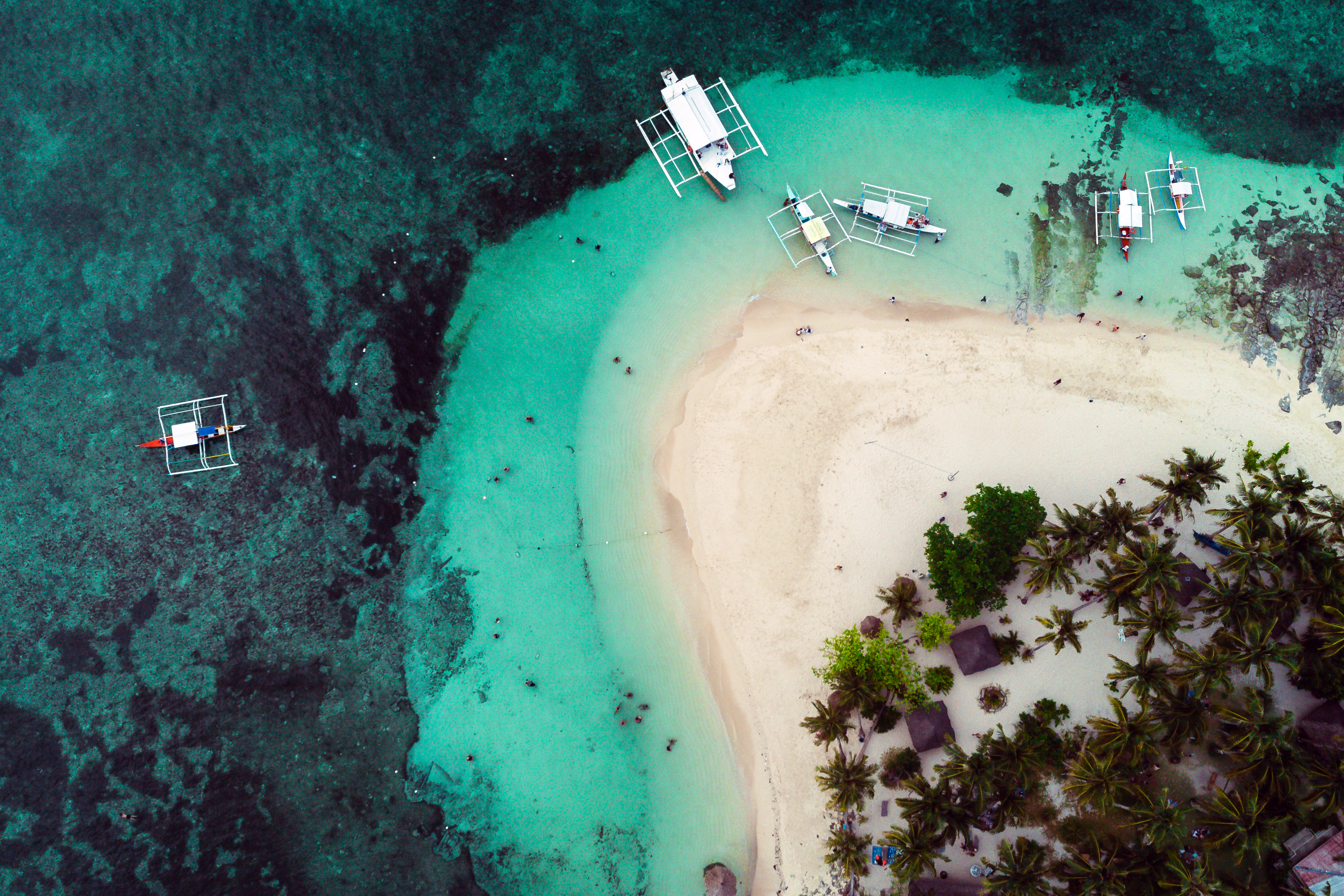
Guyam Island

== See also ==
- Kitesurfing
- List of protected areas of the Philippines
