= List of tourist attractions in the Philippines =

Popular tourist attractions in the Philippines include the following:

== Amusement, national and natural parks, and monuments ==
Color Key

- UNESCO World Heritage Site
- Protected Area
- Historical Sites

| Name | Image | City/Municipality | Province | Region | Notes |
|---|---|---|---|---|---|
| Bataan National Park | | Abucay; Bagac; Balanga; Hermosa; Morong; Orani; Samal | Bataan | Central Luzon | |
| Biak-na-Bato National Park | | Doña Remedios Trinidad; San Ildefonso; San Miguel | Bulacan | Central Luzon | |
| Enchanted Kingdom | | Santa Rosa | Laguna | Calabarzon | |
| Kalbario-Patapat Natural Park | | Pagudpud; Adams | Ilocos Norte | Ilocos Region | The natural park was established on April 20, 2007, by Proclamation no. 1275 encompassing 3,800 hectares (9,400 acres) with a buffer zone of 1,937 hectares (4,790 acres). The park was created under the National Integrated Protected Areas System (NIPAS) of the Department of Environment and Natural Resources. |
| MacArthur Landing Memorial National Park | | Palo | Leyte | Eastern Visayas | It was declared a national park on July 12, 1977, through Letter of Instructions No. 572 signed by President Ferdinand Marcos. |
| Manila Ocean Park | | Ermita, Manila | Metro Manila (National Capital Region) | | |
| Mayon Volcano National Park | | Legazpi; Ligao; Tabaco | Albay | Bicol Region | First protected as a National Park in 1938, it was reclassified as a Natural Park in the year 2000. |
| Mount Apo Natural Park | | Davao City; Kidapawan | Davao del Sur; Cotabato | Davao Region; Soccsksargen | Declared a National Park by Manuel L. Quezon through Proclamations No. 59 on May 9, 1936, and No. 35 on May 8, 1966 |
| Mounts Iglit-Baco National Park | | Sablayan; Calintaan; Rizal; San Jose | Occidental Mindoro | Mimaropa | A protected sanctuary and home to the Tamaraws endemic to the island of Mindoro. Established as a National Park on November 9, 1970, by virtue of Republic Act No. 6148. Listed by ASEAN as one of the nine heritage parks in the Philippines in 2003. The park has also been nominated in the Tentative List of UNESCO World Heritage Sites. |
| Nagcarlan Underground Cemetery | | Nagcarlan | Laguna | Calabarzon | It is dubbed as the only underground cemetery in the country. |
| Paco Park | | Paco, Manila | Metro Manila (National Capital Region) | | It was once Manila's municipal cemetery built by the Dominicans. Dr. Jose Protacio Rizal, Philippine National Hero, was secretly interred at Paco Park after his execution at Bagumbayan on December 30, 1896, and was guarded for fifteen days by the Guardia Civil Veterana. His remains were exhumed on August 17, 1898, and on December 30, 1912, was laid underneath the monument dedicated to him at the Luneta as stated in the Park's marker. |
| Quezon Memorial Circle | | Quezon City | Metro Manila (National Capital Region) | | Its main feature is a tall mausoleum containing the remains of Manuel L. Quezon, the second official President of the Philippines and the first of an internationally recognized independent Philippines, and his wife, First Lady Aurora Quezon. |
| Rizal Park | | Roxas Boulevard, Manila | Metro Manila (National Capital Region) | | The park was a tribute to the Philippine's national hero, Jose Rizal, a doctor and novelist who was shot by firing squad at this site on December 30, 1896. |
| Salinas Natural Monument | | Aritao; Bambang; Kayapa | Nueva Vizcaya | Central Luzon | The park was established on May 18, 1914, as the Salinas Forest Reserve covering the Salinas Salt Springs and surrounding forest through Executive Order No. 44 signed by Governor-General Francis Burton Harrison. It was finally declared a natural monument in 2000 under the National Integrated Protected Areas System through Proclamation No. 275 by President Joseph Estrada. |
| Star City | | CCP Complex, Pasay | Metro Manila (National Capital Region) | | |

== Churches ==
Color Key

- UNESCO World Heritage Site
- Protected Area
- Historical Sites
- Minor Basilica

| Name | Image | City/Municipality | Province | Region | Notes |
|---|---|---|---|---|---|
| Antipolo Cathedral | | Antipolo | Rizal | Calabarzon | On January 14, 1954, the Catholic Bishops Conference of the Philippines declared the new Antipolo Church as declared the National Shrine to Our Lady of Peace and Good Voyage. The church was elevated to the status of cathedral on June 25, 1983, upon the canonical erection of the Diocese of Antipolo. |
| Baclaran Church | | Baclaran, Parañaque | Metro Manila (National Capital Region) | | Since the Feast of the Immaculate Conception 1958, the shrine has been authorised by the Holy See to remain open 24 hours a day throughout the entire year. The shrine itself was blessed by Pope John Paul II during his first Apostolic Visit to Metro Manila in 1981. |
| Baclayon Church | | Baclayon | Bohol | Central Visayas | It was severely damaged when a 7.2 magnitude earthquake struck Bohol and other parts of Central Visayas on October 15, 2013. |
| Baguio Cathedral | | Baguio | Benguet | Cordillera Administrative Region | The site where the cathedral currently stands was a hill referred to as Kampo by the Ibaloi people. In 1907, a Catholic mission was established at the site by Belgian missionaries from the Congregatio Immaculati Cordis Mariae, which they later called Mount Mary. |
| Barasoain Church | | Malolos | Bulacan | Central Luzon | Site of the First Philippine Republic. |
| Basilica del Santo Niño | | Cebu City | Cebu | Central Visayas | In 1965, during the 4th centenary of the Christianization of the Philippines, Pope Paul VI elevated the church to the rank of minor basilica. On October 15, 2013, the bell tower of the church was destroyed when a 7.2 magnitude earthquake struck Bohol and other parts of Central Visayas. |
| Basilica Minore of Our Lady of Charity | | Agoo | La Union | Ilocos Region | On July 15, 1982, Pope John Paul II gave due course to the petition of Bishop Salvador Lazo of the Diocese of San Fernando, La Union that the Shrine of Our Lady of Charity be endowed with the title of a Minor Basilica. |
| Basilica of Our Lady of Piat | | Piat | Cagayan | Cagayan Valley | On June 22, 1989, it was made into a minor basilica by Pope John Paul II. |
| Basilica of Saint Martin of Tours | | Taal | Batangas | Calabarzon | Asia's largest Catholic church. On December 8, 1954, the church was elevated into a minor basilica by Pope Pius XII. |
| Binondo Church | | Binondo, Manila | Metro Manila (National Capital Region) | | In 1956, the church was made into a minor basilica by Pope Pius XII. |
| Cagayan de Oro Cathedral | | Cagayan de Oro | Misamis Oriental | Northern Mindanao | During its early history, it was believed that the first church structure built in present-day Cagayan de Oro (formerly Cagayan de Misamis) was erected in 1624 by the Augustinian Recollects under the leadership of Father Agustin de San Pedro. |
| Cathedral of Praise | | Manila | Metro Manila (National Capital Region) | | |
| Central United Methodist Church | | Ermita, Manila | Metro Manila (National Capital Region) | | Founded on March 5, 1899, during the American Occupation, it was originally named Central Methodist Episcopal Church. The church was originally designed by Juan Arellano. |
| Church of the Gesù | | Quezon City | Metro Manila (National Capital Region) | | |
| Cosmopolitan Church | | Ermita, Manila | Metro Manila (National Capital Region) | | |
| Ermita Church | | Ermita, Manila | Metro Manila (National Capital Region) | | The church is home to the Marian image of Our Lady of Guidance, which is considered to be the oldest Marian image in the Philippines, and in whose honor the church is officially named after and dedicated to. |
| Iglesia Evangelica Metodista en las Islas Filipinas | | Manila | Metro Manila (National Capital Region) | | |
| Iglesia ni Cristo Central Temple | | Quezon City | Metro Manila (National Capital Region) | | |
| Imus Cathedral | | Imus | Cavite | Calabarzon | The cathedral was declared a structure of historical significance with the placing of a historical marker by then National Historical Institute of the Philippines on November 13, 2006. |
| Jaro Cathedral | | Jaro, Iloilo City | Iloilo | Western Visayas | The Catholic Bishops' Conference of the Philippines formally declared the cathedral the National Shrine of Our Lady of the Candles (Nuestra Señora de la Candelaria) in February 2012. |
| Las Piñas Church | | Las Piñas | Metro Manila (National Capital Region) | | The church is home to the famous Bamboo Organ. |
| Loboc Church | | Loboc | Bohol | Central Visayas | It was severely damaged when a 7.2 magnitude earthquake struck Bohol and other parts of Central Visayas on October 15, 2013. |
| Loon Church | | Loon | Bohol | Central Visayas | It was severely damaged when a 7.2 magnitude earthquake struck Bohol and other parts of Central Visayas on October 15, 2013. |
| Malate Church | | Malate, Manila | Metro Manila (National Capital Region) | | The church is dedicated to Nuestra Señora de los Remedios ("Our Lady of Remedies"), the patroness of childbirth. |
| Malolos Cathedral | | Malolos | Bulacan | Central Luzon | On December 4, 1999, it was elevated into a minor basilica by Pope John Paul II. |
| Manila Cathedral | | Intramuros, Manila | Metro Manila (National Capital Region) | | On April 27, 1981, Pope John Paul II issued papal bull Quod Ipsum designating the cathedral as a minor basilica by his own Motu Proprio. |
| Maribojoc Church | | Maribojoc | Bohol | Central Visayas | It was severely damaged when a 7.2 magnitude earthquake struck Bohol and other parts of Central Visayas on October 15, 2013. |
| Miagao Church | | Miagao | Iloilo | Western Visayas | The church was declared as a UNESCO World Heritage Site on December 11, 1993, under the collective title Baroque Churches of the Philippines, a collection of four Baroque Spanish-era churches. |
| Minor Basilica of the Immaculate Conception | | Batangas City | Batangas | Calabarzon | On February 13, 1945, the church was declared a Minor Basilica of the Immaculate Conception by Pope Pius XII. |
| Minor Basilica of Our Lady of the Most Holy Rosary of Manaoag | | Manaoag | Pangasinan | Ilocos Region | In February 2015, the Shrine of Our Lady of The Rosary of Manaoag was elevated to a minor basilica by Pope Francis. |
| Molo Church | | Molo, Iloilo City | Iloilo | Western Visayas | Built in 1888, it is considered as the only Gothic-Renaissance church in the country outside of Metro Manila. It is also recognized as "the women's church" or "the feminist church" because it only features images of female saints inside, including Saint Anne, the patron saint of Molo. |
| Naga Cathedral | | Naga | Camarines Sur | Bicol Region | The first cathedral built for Naga was founded after the Diocese of Cáceres was established in 1595. It is a suffragan of the Diocese of Manila created by the papal bull of August 14, 1595, which also elevated the Diocese of Manila into an archdiocese. The church was destroyed by fire in 1768. |
| Nuestra Señora de Gracia Church | | Makati | Metro Manila (National Capital Region) | | |
| Our Lady of Montserrat Abbey | | Mendiola, Manila | Metro Manila (National Capital Region) | | |
| Our Lady of the Abandoned Parish Church | | Marikina | Metro Manila (National Capital Region) | | |
| Nagcarlan Church | | Nagcarlan | Laguna | Calabarzon | The church is famous for its Underground Cemetery which was built in 1845. |
| Paoay Church | | Paoay | Ilocos Norte | Ilocos Region | It is declared as a National Cultural Treasure by the Philippine government in 1973 and a UNESCO World Heritage Site under the collective group of Baroque Churches of the Philippines in 1993. |
| Parañaque Cathedral | | Parañaque | Metro Manila (National Capital Region) | | |
| Parish of the Holy Sacrifice | | Quezon City | Metro Manila (National Capital Region) | | |
| Pasig Cathedral | | Pasig | Metro Manila (National Capital Region) | | |
| Peñafrancia Basilica | | Naga | Camarines Sur | Bicol Region | On May 22, 1985, the church was consecrated into a minor basilica Pope John Paul II. |
| Philippine Independent Church (Parish of La Purisima Concepcion de Malabon) | | Malabon | Metro Manila (National Capital Region) | | |
| Pinaglabanan Church | | San Juan | Metro Manila (National Capital Region) | | |
| Quiapo Church | | Quiapo, Manila | Metro Manila (National Capital Region) | | On 1988, the church was made Basilica by Pope John Paul II thru the initiative of Cardinal Jaime Sin and Papal Nuncio Bruno Torpigliani. |
| Saint James the Apostle Parish Church | | Paete | Laguna | Calabarzon | The church is known for its huge and exquisite collection of images depicting the Passion of Christ, its century-old paintings and wooden images of saints. |
| Sampaloc Church | | Sampaloc, Manila | Metro Manila (National Capital Region) | | |
| San Agustin Church | | Intramuros, Manila | Metro Manila (National Capital Region) | | In 1993, San Agustin Church was one of four Philippine churches constructed during the Spanish colonial period to be designated as a World Heritage Site by UNESCO, under the collective title Baroque Churches of the Philippines. |
| San Bartolome Church | | Malabon | Metro Manila (National Capital Region) | | |
| San Fernando de Dilao Church | | Paco, Manila | Metro Manila (National Capital Region) | | On February 7, 2012, the church was designated as pro-cathedral of the Archdiocese of Manila until structural renovations on the Cathedral-Basilica of the Immaculate Conception were completed on April 9, 2014. |
| San Joaquin Church | | San Joaquin | Iloilo | Western Visayas | |
| San Miguel Church | | San Miguel, Manila | Metro Manila (National Capital Region) | | |
| San Pedro Macati Church | | Makati | Metro Manila (National Capital Region) | | |
| San Sebastian Cathedral | | Bacolod | Negros Occidental | Western Visayas | |
| San Sebastian Church | | Quiapo, Manila | Metro Manila (National Capital Region) | | Only prefabricated steel church in the world. Only all-steel temple in Asia, On June 24, 1980, it was elevated into a minor basilica by Pope John Paul II. |
| Santa Barbara Church | | Santa Barbara | Iloilo | Western Visayas | |
| Santa Cruz Church | | Manila | Metro Manila (National Capital Region) | | |
| Santa Maria Church | | Santa Maria | Ilocos Sur | Ilocos Region | The church was designated as a UNESCO World Heritage Site on December 11, 1993, as part of the Baroque Churches of the Philippines, a collection of four Baroque Spanish-era churches. |
| Santo Domingo Church | | Quezon Avenue, Quezon City | Metro Manila (National Capital Region) | | On October 4, 2012, it was declared as a National Culture Treasure through Republic Act No. 4846, otherwise known as the Cultural Properties Preservation and Protection Act making it as the first national culture treasure in Quezon City. |
| Santuario del Santo Cristo | | San Juan | Metro Manila (National Capital Region) | | |
| St. Anthony Shrine | | Sampaloc, Manila | Metro Manila (National Capital Region) | | |
| Tayabas Basilica | | Tayabas | Quezon | Calabarzon | Largest Catholic church in Quezon. On October 18, 1988, the title Minor Basilica was conferred upon the church by Pope John Paul II and the Congregation for Divine Cult. |
| Tondo Church | | Tondo, Manila | Metro Manila (National Capital Region) | | |

== Cultural and historical landmarks ==
Color Key

- UNESCO World Heritage Site
- Protected Area
- Historical Sites

| Name | Image | City/Municipality | Province | Region | Notes |
|---|---|---|---|---|---|
| Aguinaldo Shrine | | Kawit | Cavite | Calabarzon | Ancestral home of Emilio Aguinaldo, 1st President of the Philippines. |
| Bagacay Point Lighthouse | | Liloan | Cebu | Central Visayas | |
| Bahay Nakpil-Bautista | | Quiapo, Manila | Metro Manila (National Capital Region) | | |
| Basco Lighthouse | | Basco | Batanes | Cagayan Valley | |
| Binondo | | Manila | Metro Manila (National Capital Region) | | Oldest Chinatown in the world. |
| Bonifacio Monument | | Caloocan | Metro Manila (National Capital Region) | | |
| Cagsawa Ruins | | Daraga | Albay | Bicol Region | |
| Calle Real Heritage Zone | | Iloilo City | Iloilo | Western Visayas | |
| Cape Bojeador Lighthouse | | Burgos | Ilocos Norte | Ilocos Region | |
| Cape Bolinao Lighthouse | | Bolinao | Pangasinan | Ilocos Region | |
| Cape Engaño Lighthouse | | Santa Ana | Cagayan | Cagayan Valley | |
| Cape Melville Lighthouse | | Balabac Island | Palawan | Mimaropa | |
| Capul Island Lighthouse | | Capul | Northern Samar | Eastern Visayas | |
| Casino Español de Manila | | Ermita, Manila | Metro Manila (National Capital Region) | | The Casino Español de Manila was a club established in 1893 by Spaniards living in the Philippines as their exclusive venue for recreational and social activities. It later opened its doors to Filipino members to foster Spanish-Filipino ties in the country. |
| Corregidor Island | | Cavite City | Cavite | Calabarzon | |
| Don Roman Santos Building | | Manila | Metro Manila (National Capital Region) | | |
| EDSA Shrine | | Quezon City | Metro Manila (National Capital Region) | | Built in 1989 to commemorate the memories of the People Power Revolution. |
| Fort of San Antonio Abad | | Manila | Metro Manila (National Capital Region) | | |
| Fort Santiago | | Manila | Metro Manila (National Capital Region) | | |
| Heritage City of Vigan | | Vigan | Ilocos Sur | Ilocos Region | One of the New7WondersCities. |
| Igorot Stone Kingdom | | Baguio | Benguet | Cordillera Administrative Region (CAR) | A privately owned cultural theme park located along Longlong Road, Barangay Pinsao Proper, Baguio City. Built in 2021 by engineer Pio Velasco to showcase Cordilleran stonework and folklore. Temporarily closed in 2022 over permit and safety issues, then reopened in 2023 after compliance with city regulations. |
| Intramuros | | Manila | Metro Manila (National Capital Region) | | The Walled City. |
| Lapu-Lapu Shrine | | Lapu-Lapu | Cebu | Central Visayas | |
| Lopez Heritage House | | Jaro, Iloilo City | Iloilo | Western Visayas | |
| Luneta Hotel | | Ermita, Manila | Metro Manila (National Capital Region) | | |
| Jaro Belfry | | Jaro, Iloilo City | Iloilo | Western Visayas | |
| Magellan's Cross | | Cebu City | Cebu | Central Visayas | |
| Magellan Shrine | | Lapu-Lapu | Cebu | Central Visayas | |
| Malacañang Palace | | Manila | Metro Manila (National Capital Region) | | Official residence of the President of the Philippines. |
| Maniguin Island Lighthouse | | Culasi | Antique | Western Visayas | |
| Manila Army and Navy Club | | Manila | Metro Manila (National Capital Region) | | On April 26, 1991, it was declared a National Historical Landmark by the National Historical Institute. |
| Manila Central Post Office | | Manila | Metro Manila (National Capital Region) | | |
| Manila City Hall | | Manila | Metro Manila (National Capital Region) | | It is where the Mayor of Manila holds office and the chambers of the Manila City Council. |
| Manila Hotel | | Ermita, Manila | Metro Manila (National Capital Region) | | |
| Manila Metropolitan Theater | | Manila | Metro Manila (National Capital Region) | | It was designed by architect Juan M. Arellano and inaugurated on December 10, 1931. |
| National Historical Commission of the Philippines | | Manila | Metro Manila (National Capital Region) | | The present day NHCP was established in 1972 as part of the reorganization of government after President Ferdinand Marcos' declaration of martial law, but the roots of the institute can be traced back to 1933, when the American colonial Insular Government first established the Philippine Historical Research and Markers Committee (PHRMC). |
| Nielson Field | | Makati | Metro Manila (National Capital Region) | | |
| Rizal Shrine | | Calamba | Laguna | Calabarzon | Ancestral home of Jose Rizal, National Hero of the Philippines. |
| The Ruins | | Talisay | Negros Occidental | Western Visayas | |
| Tutuban railway station | | Manila | Metro Manila (National Capital Region) | | |

== Natural landmarks ==
Color Key

- UNESCO World Heritage Site
- Protected Area
- Historical Sites

| Name | Image | City/Municipality | Province | Region | Notes |
|---|---|---|---|---|---|
| Anilao Dive Spots | | Mabini | Batangas | Calabarzon | |
| Apo Island | | Dauin | Negros Oriental | Central Visayas | Cited as one of the best diving spots in the world. |
| Apo Reef | | Sablayan | Occidental Mindoro | Mimaropa | World's 2nd largest contiguous coral reef system and the largest in the country. |
| Banaue Rice Terraces | | Banaue | Ifugao | Cordillera Administrative Region | Eighth Wonder of the World. |
| Boracay Island | | Malay | Aklan | Western Visayas | One of the Best Islands in the World according to Travel + Leisure. |
| Cagayan de Oro River | | Talakag; Baungon; Libona; Iligan; Cagayan de Oro | Bukidnon; Lanao del Norte; Misamis Oriental | Northern Mindanao | |
| Camaya Coast | | Mariveles | Bataan | Central Luzon | |
| Caramoan | | Caramoan | Camarines Sur | Bicol Region | |
| Chocolate Hills | | Sagbayan; Batuan; Carmen; Bilar; Sierra Bullones; Valencia | Bohol | Central Visayas | |
| Coron Island | | Coron | Palawan | Mimaropa | The island is known for several Japanese shipwrecks of World War II vintage. Because of its unique ecological features, it is entirely protected by several legal proclamations. |
| El Nido | | El Nido | Palawan | Mimaropa | Best Beach and Island in the Philippines according to CNNGo. |
| Dahican Beach | | Mati | Davao Oriental | Davao | |
| Great Santa Cruz Island | | Zamboanga City | Zamboanga del Sur | Zamboanga Peninsula | |
| Hinatuan Enchanted River | | Hinatuan | Surigao del Sur | Caraga | |
| Hinulugang Taktak | | Antipolo | Rizal | Calabarzon | |
| Hundred Islands National Park | | Alaminos | Pangasinan | Ilocos Region | |
| Islas de Gigantes | | Carles | Iloilo | Western Visayas | |
| Kanlaon Volcano | | Bago; Canlaon; La Carlota; La Castellana; Murcia; San Carlos; Vallehermoso | Negros Occidental; Negros Oriental | Western Visayas; Central Visayas | The highest point of the whole Negros and Visayas by 2,465 metres (8,087 ft). 3rd Most Active Volcano in the Philippines. |
| Lake Balinsasayao | | Sibulan | Negros Oriental | Central Visayas | |
| Lake Danao | | Ormoc | Leyte | Eastern Visayas | |
| Limunsudan Falls | | Iligan | Lanao del Norte | Northern Mindanao | |
| Loboc River | | Carmen | Bohol | Central Visayas | |
| Mactan Island | | Lapu-Lapu | Cebu | Central Visayas | |
| Maria Cristina Falls | | Iligan | Lanao del Norte | Northern Mindanao | |
| Matabungkay | | Lian | Batangas | Calabarzon | |
| Mayon Volcano | | Legazpi | Albay | Bicol Region | Renowned as the "perfect cone" because of its almost symmetric conical shape. Most Active Volcano in the Philippines. |
| Mount Apo | | Davao City; Kidapawan | Davao del Sur; Cotabato | Davao Region; Soccsksargen | Highest mountain in the Philippines; The Grandfather of Philippine Mountains |
| Mount Banahaw | | San Pablo; Candelaria; Dolores; San Antonio; Tiaong | Laguna; Quezon | Calabarzon | 9th Most Active Volcano in the Philippines. |
| Mount Bulusan | | Bulusan; Irosin | Sorsogon | Bicol Region | 4th Most Active Volcano in the Philippines. |
| Mount Hamiguitan | | Governor Generoso; Mati; San Isidro | Davao Oriental | Davao Region | The only UNESCO World Heritage Site in Mindanao and the sixth in the Philippines |
| Mount Hibok-Hibok | | Mambajao | Camiguin | Northern Mindanao | 7th Most Active Volcano in the Philippines. |
| Mount Isarog | | Calabanga; Goa; Naga; Ocampo; Pili; Tigaon | Camarines Sur | Bicol Region | |
| Mount Makiling | | Calamba; Santo Tomas | Batangas; Laguna | Calabarzon | |
| Mount Mariveles | | Mariveles | Bataan | Central Luzon | |
| Mount Pinatubo | | Whole length of Zambales; Bamban; Camiling; Capas; Mayantoc; San Clemente; San Jose; Santa Ignacia; Angeles City; Floridablanca; Porac; Mabalacat | Zambales; Tarlac; Pampanga | Central Luzon | |
| Mount Pulag | | Bokod; Buguias; Kabayan; Tinoc; Kayapa | Benguet; Ifugao; Nueva Vizcaya | Cordillera Administrative Region; Cagayan Valley | 3rd highest mountain in the Philippines and Luzon's highest peak. |
| Mount Samat | | Pilar | Bataan | Central Luzon | |
| Pagsanjan Falls | | Cavinti; Pagsanjan | Laguna | Calabarzon | |
| Pagudpud coastline | | Pagudpud | Ilocos Norte | Ilocos Region | Boracay of the North |
| Panglao Island | | Panglao; Dauis | Bohol | Central Visayas | |
| Puerto Galera | | Puerto Galera | Oriental Mindoro | Mimaropa | One of the most beautiful bays in the world. |
| Puerto Princesa Subterranean River National Park | | Puerto Princesa | Palawan | Mimaropa | One of the New7Wonders of Nature. |
| Pujada Bay | | Mati | Davao Oriental | Davao | One of the most beautiful bays in the world. |
| Punta Fuego | | Nasugbu | Batangas | Calabarzon | |
| Rice Terraces of the Philippine Cordilleras | | Banaue; Kiangan; Mayoyao; Hungduan | Ifugao | Cordillera Administrative Region | The first-ever property to be included in the cultural landscape category of the UNESCO World Heritage Site List. |
| Rio Grande de Cagayan | | Aparri; Bayombong; Diadi; Ilagan; Jones; Maddela; Nagtipunan; Tuguegarao; Tumauini | Cagayan; Isabela; Nueva Vizcaya; Quirino | Cagayan Valley | |
| Samal Island | | Samal | Davao del Norte | Davao Region | |
| Siargao Island | | Burgos; Dapa; Del Carmen; General Luna; Pilar; San Benito; San Isidro; Santa Monica; Socorro | Surigao del Norte | Caraga | |
| Sierra Madre | | Aurora; Bulacan; Cagayan; Isabela; Laguna; Nueva Ecija; Nueva Vizcaya; Quezon; Quirino; Rizal | | Cagayan Valley; Calabarzon; Central Luzon | Longest Mountain Range in the Philippines. |
| Taal Volcano | | San Nicolas; Talisay | Batangas | Calabarzon | It is a Lake within a Volcano within a Lake within a Volcano. It is the 2nd Most Active Volcano in the Philippines. |
| Tubbataha Reef | | Puerto Princesa | Palawan | Mimaropa | |
| Verde Island | | Batangas City | Batangas | Calabarzon | |
| White Island | | Mambajao | Camiguin | Northern Mindanao | |

== Urban architecture landmarks ==
Color Key

- UNESCO World Heritage Site
- Protected Area
- Historical Sites

| Name | Image | City/Municipality | Province | Region | Notes |
|---|---|---|---|---|---|
| Araneta Coliseum | | Cubao, Quezon City | Metro Manila (National Capital Region) | | |
| Asilo de San Vicente de Paul | | United Nations, Avenue | Metro Manila (National Capital Region) | | Asilo de San Vicente de Paul (ASVP), formerly known as Casa de San Vicente de Paul, was founded on July 26, 1885, by Sr. Asuncion Ventura, DC, a native of Bacolor, Pampanga. |
| Ayala Center | | Makati | Metro Manila (National Capital Region) | | |
| Ayala Museum | | Makati | Metro Manila (National Capital Region) | | |
| Bangui Wind Farm | | Bangui | Ilocos Norte | Ilocos Region | 1st Wind Farm in the Philippines. |
| Bonifacio Global City | | Taguig | Metro Manila (National Capital Region) | | |
| Camp Crame | | EDSA, Quezon City | Metro Manila (National Capital Region) | | |
| Cultural Center of the Philippines | | Pasay | Metro Manila (National Capital Region) | | |
| Eastwood City | | Quezon City | Metro Manila (National Capital Region) | | |
| Entertainment City | | Parañaque | Metro Manila (National Capital Region) | | |
| Iloilo Convention Center | | Mandurriao, Iloilo City | Iloilo | Western Visayas | |
| Mactan–Cebu International Airport | | Lapu-Lapu | Cebu | Central Visayas | |
| Mall of Asia Arena | | Bay City, Pasay | Metro Manila (National Capital Region) | | |
| National Library of the Philippines | | Ermita, Manila | Metro Manila (National Capital Region) | | The National Library of the Philippines can trace its history to the establishment of the Museo-Biblioteca de Filipinas (Museum-Library of the Philippines), established by a royal order of the Spanish government on August 12, 1887. |
| National Museum of the Philippines | | Manila | Metro Manila (National Capital Region) | | |
| Resorts World Manila | | Pasay | Metro Manila (National Capital Region) | | |
| Robinsons Galleria | | Quezon City | Metro Manila (National Capital Region) | | |
| Robinsons Place Manila | | Manila | Metro Manila (National Capital Region) | | |
| Shangri-la Plaza | | Mandaluyong | Metro Manila (National Capital Region) | | |
| SM City Bacolod | | Bacolod | Negros Occidental | Western Visayas | 10th largest SM mall by land area and the 3rd in Visayas. |
| SM City Cebu | | Cebu City | Cebu | Central Visayas | 4th largest mall in the Philippines and the 1st SM mall in Visayas. |
| SM City North EDSA | | Quezon City | Metro Manila (National Capital Region) | | 2nd largest mall in the Philippines and 4th largest in the world. |
| SM Lanang Premier | | Davao City | Davao del Sur | Davao Region | Largest mall in Mindanao. |
| SM Mall of Asia | | Pasay | Metro Manila (National Capital Region) | | 3rd largest mall in the Philippines and 11th largest in the world. |
| SM Megamall | | Mandaluyong | Metro Manila (National Capital Region) | | Largest mall in the Philippines and 3rd largest in the world. |

== See also ==
- List of museums in the Philippines
- List of airports in the Philippines
- List of ports in the Philippines
- Tourism in the Philippines
