= Siargao Island Institute of Technology =

School in Surigao del Norte, Philippines

Coordinates: 9°45′40″N 126°02′50″E

- Type: Private nonsectarian
- Established: 1995
- Founders: Sol Forcadilla-Matugas, PhD.
- President: Francisco Matugas, LLB
- Vice-president: Andresito Solloso
- Location: Dapa, Surigao del Norte, Philippines
- Student Publication: Herald

The Siargao Island Institute of Technology is located on the north side of the Dapa, Surigao del Norte, Philippines. Most of its buildings are in the northwest corner of Dapa, but some are spread across the north side of the town.

== History ==
It was in the summer of 1995 when the idea of putting up a school for the welfare of poor but deserving students in Siargao and Bucas Grande Islands, Surigao del Norte came about. It was a brainchild of then Department of Education, Culture and Sports (DECS) – Caraga Regional Director Dr. Sol Matugas. The school, which came to be known as the Siargao Island Institute of Technology (SIIT) was born with the help of the director's son Francisco Jose Matugas, plus the financial support of the Siargao Foundation set up by her husband, former Surigao del Norte Governor Francisco Matugas.

Harnessing her expertise in documentation, in compliance with permit application requirements, and in the installation of all necessary equipment and facilities prescribed by the Commission on Higher Education (CHED), Dr. Matugas easily obtained permits to offer Bachelor in Elementary Education (BEEd), Bachelor in Secondary Education (BSEd) and Associate in Computer Science courses by June 1996.

Classes during its first year of operation were held in three classrooms at Gerona Building along Sto. Nino Street in Dapa, Surigao del Norte. The late Dr. Genevieve Guda was designated as the School Director. With her were three full-time teachers Raul de Castro, Jr., Jonathan Etcuban and Rey Baquirquir from Cebu City. Part-time teachers from the island were also hired to complement the teaching staff.

In just a matter of eight years since it opened with only 148 students, SIIT’s enrolment quadrupled to over 500 students by 2003. The phenomenal growth in enrolment was brought about by the expansion of course offerings. This then required the opening of additional classrooms in two more buildings along Sto. Nino Street.

On March 20, 1998, the first Commencement Exercises were held for the 15 graduates of its two-year Associate in Computer Science course. Technical Education and Skills Development Authority (TESDA) Regional Director Enrique Einar was the commencement speaker.

The year 2000 marked a new milestone in the history of SIIT, when the government granted recognition to its two-year Computer Secretarial course. With an initial enrollment of only 15 students, it did not take long for the new program to attract about 50 students. It was also during this year when the first batch of candidates for graduation from the baccalaureate degrees received their diplomas. Twelve students graduated with the degree of BSEd and 43 graduated with the degree of BSEEd. The candidates took pride in having Regional Director Joanna Cuenca of the Commission on Higher Education (CHED), Caraga Region, as their commencement speaker.

By 2003, permits were issued allowing SIIT to offer two new four-year courses, Bachelor of Science in Office Administration (BSOA) and Bachelor of Science in Criminology (BSCrim).

Two thousand five was yet another turning point in the history of the institute when the construction of the new Don Mariano Matugas building was completed. The availability of more classrooms, new equipment, laboratory and other facilities, including an Internet facility, encouraged more students to study at SIIT, which resulted in an increase of enrolment from 500 to almost 700 during the first semester of academic year 2005-2006.

Despite the continuing economic downturn that heavily affected enrolment of other tertiary schools with higher tuition fees, SIIT’s enrolment continually grew due to the opening of more academic programs, such as the Bachelor of Science in Computer Science (BSCS), Bachelor of Science in Information Technology (BSIT), majors in Biology, Chemistry, and Physics for BSEd, plus the two-year Licensed Practical Nursing Course (LPN), which is duly accredited by TESDA. Other schools’ loss became SIIT’s gain because students who could no longer afford their tuition fees had to turn to SIIT as a fallback for their continued studies.

== Present programs ==
In order to keep pace with the rapid advancement in communications and information technology, SIIT pioneered the establishment of an Internet facility in the entire Siargao and Bucas Grande Islands. The islands, which compose the First District of the province of Surigao del Norte, is home to nine municipalities – General Luna (where the world-famous Cloud 9 is located), Del Carmen, San Benito, Pilar, Burgos, San Isidro, Sta. Monica, Socorro, and Dapa, the latter being the center of commerce, trade and industry.

Despite the availability of four college annex buildings where the administrative offices, laboratories and classrooms are located, enrolment growth which is projected to increase by at least 30 percent this coming AY 2007-2008 will need more classrooms. Having anticipated such an increase, a new 10-classroom building is targeted to commence construction by early next year. It will be erected side by side with the present main Don Mariano Matugas Building.

Meanwhile, blueprints for the renovation and redesign of at least two of the four existing college campuses have been made. Carpentry and masonry jobs are almost complete to conform with the recommendations of the Regional Quality Assessment Team (RQAT), such that academic programs with more students like the B.S. Criminology will have its offices, laboratory and classrooms in just one building or campus.

The expected increase in enrolment this June will be due to the opening of a number of one-year and two-year ladderized programs under TESDA. The program designs are leading to four-year degree academic programs under CHED. Such programs include, among others, the one-year and two-year Security Services leading to B.S. Criminology; two-year Computer Hardware Servicing leading to BSIT, one-year and two-year Housekeeping and Bar Tendering leading to B.S. in Tourism and B.S. in Hotel and Restaurant Management, one-year Caregiver Course and other short-term technical-vocational and skills training programs under TESDA.
