= Francisco Matugas =

Filipino politician

Francisco T. Matugas
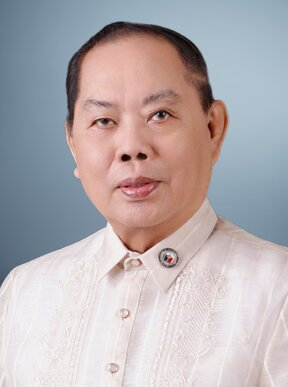
- Official portrait, 2025

Member of the Philippine House of Representatives from Surigao del Norte's 1st congressional district
- Incumbent
- Assumed office June 30, 2025
- Preceded by: Francisco Jose Matugas II
- In office June 30, 2007 – June 30, 2016
- Preceded by: Glenda B. Ecleo
- Succeeded by: Francisco Jose F. Matugas II

Governor of Surigao del Norte
- In office June 30, 2019 – June 30, 2022
- Vice Governor: Eddie Gokiangkee Jr.
- Preceded by: Sol F. Matugas
- Succeeded by: Robert Lyndon Barbers
- In office June 30, 1992 – June 30, 2001
- Vice Governor: Alejandrino Echin (1992–1995); Regina Barbers (1995–1998); Cruz Yuipco Jr. (1998–2001)
- Preceded by: Moises Ecleo
- Succeeded by: Robert Lyndon Barbers

Personal details
- Born: Francisco Tinio Matugas; May 10, 1942 (age 84) Dapa, Surigao, Commonwealth of the Philippines
- Party: PFP (2026–present); PS (local party; 2007–present)
- Other political affiliations: Lakas (2007–2010; 2024–2026); PDP (2018–2024); Liberal (2010–2018); KAMPI (2007)
- Spouse: Sol Forcadilla-Matugas
- Occupation: Politician; Businessman
- Profession: Lawyer
- Nickname: "Lalo Matugas"

Francisco Tinio Matugas (born May 10, 1942), also known as Lalo Matugas, is a Filipino politician from the first district of the province of Surigao del Norte, Philippines. He served as Governor of the province from 2019 to 2022. He was first elected as Governor in 1992, and served for 9 years. He also previously served as the congressman of the province's first district.

His son Francisco Jose "Bingo" F. Matugas II is currently the incumbent Representative (Congressman) of Surigao del Norte's first legislative district while his wife Sol F. Matugas is a former governor of the same province. His sister and relative Elizabeth "Abeth" T. Matugas and Francisco "Junjun" M. Gonzales are the incumbent Mayor and Vice Mayor of Dapa, Surigao del Norte respectively. His younger brother Ernesto "Nitoy" T. Matugas and nephew Ernesto "Estong" U. Matugas Jr. were former Vice Mayor and Mayor of Surigao City respectively.

Matugas is also a former president of Siargao Island Institute of Technology whom his wife Sol is now the current president.
