= Francisco Jose Matugas II =

Filipino politician

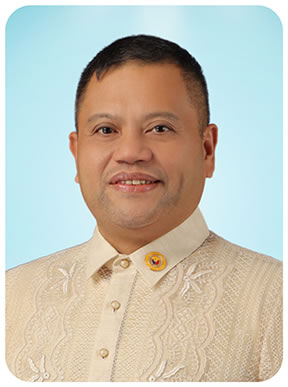
- Official portrait, 2022

Member of the Philippine House of Representatives from Surigao del Norte's 1st District
- In office June 30, 2016 – June 30, 2025
- Preceded by: Francisco T. Matugas
- Succeeded by: Francisco T. Matugas

Personal details
- Born: Francisco Jose Forcadilla Matugas II; March 18, 1969 (age 57) Sampaloc, Manila, Philippines
- Party: Lakas-CMD (2022–present); PS (local party; 2015–present)
- Other political affiliations: PDP–Laban (2017–2022); Liberal (2015–2017)
- Spouse: Ethel Labella-Matugas
- Children: Frances Estrelle; Franz Elijah; Francis Eugene
- Parent(s): Francisco Matugas (father); Sol Matugas (mother)
- Education: University of San Carlos; University of the Philippines Open University
- Occupation: Politician
- Nickname: "Bingo Matugas"

Francisco Jose Forcadilla Matugas II, also known as Bingo Matugas, (born March 18, 1969) is a Filipino politician from the first district of the province of Surigao del Norte, Philippines. He served as representative of the province's first legislative district from 2016 to 2025.

His parents Francisco Matugas and Sol Forcadilla-Matugas are former governors of Surigao del Norte.
