= Pilar, Surigao del Norte =

Municipality in Surigao del Norte, Philippines

Pilar
- Municipality
- Municipality of Pilar
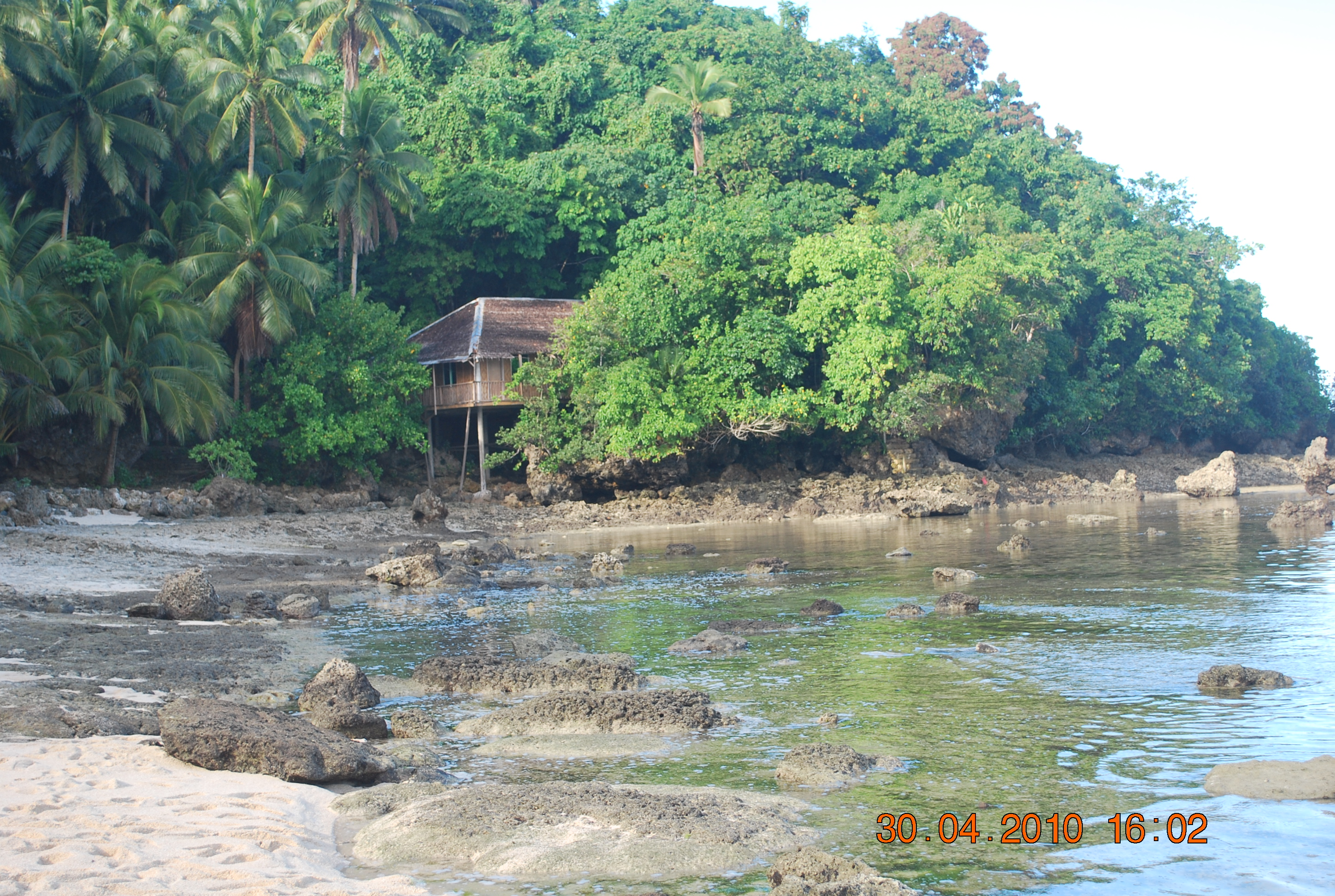
- Cottage at Magpupungko

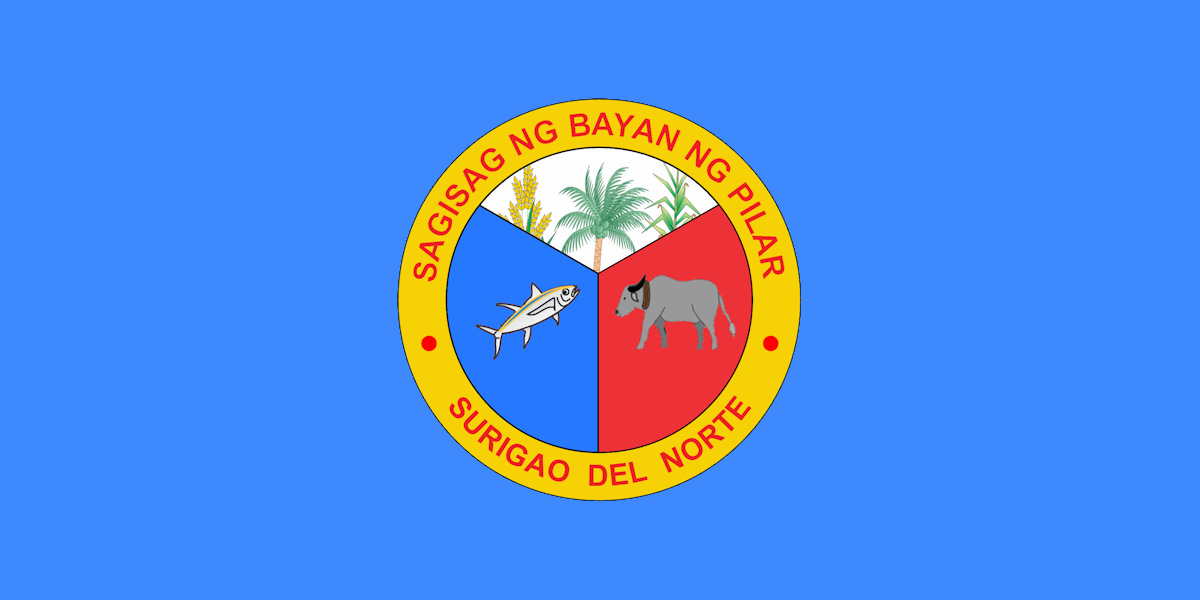
- Flag Seal

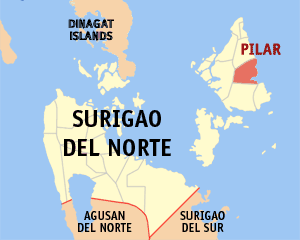
- Map of Surigao del Norte with Pilar highlighted
- Interactive map of Pilar
- Location within the Philippines
- Coordinates: 9°51′50″N 126°06′03″E
- Country: Philippines
- Region: Caraga
- Province: Surigao del Norte
- District: 1st district
- Founded: October 31, 1953
- Barangay: 15 (see Barangays)

Government
  - Type: Sangguniang Bayan
  - Mayor: Jeasa C. Gonzales (LAKAS)
  - Vice Mayor: Maria Liza G. Resurreccion (LAKAS)
  - Representative: Francisco Jose F. Matugas II
  - Councilor: Members: Teofredo E. Porpayas (LAKAS); Felicidad E. Buo (LAKAS); Kiziel M. Abucayan (NP); Gilrey A. Lofranco (LAKAS); John Kristopher O. Orquina (LAKAS); Gil L. Melo (LAKAS); Clemence G. Galindo (LAKAS); Kent M. Tubo (NP)
  - Electorate: 8,989 voters (2025)

Area
  - Total: 77.11 km^{2} (29.77 sq mi)
- Elevation: 27 m (89 ft)
- Highest elevation: 259 m (850 ft)
- Lowest elevation: 0 m (0 ft)

Population (2024 census)
  - Total: 11,135
  - Density: 144.4/km^{2} (374.0/sq mi)
  - Households: 2,569

Economy
  - Income class: 4th municipal income class
  - Poverty incidence: 13.97% (2023)
  - Revenue: ₱ 119.9 million (2024)
  - Assets: ₱ 299 million (2024)
  - Expenditure: ₱ 103.4 million (2024)
  - Liabilities: ₱ 38.52 million (2024)

Service provider
  - Electricity: Siargao Electric Cooperative (SIARELCO)
- Time zone: UTC+8 (PST)
- ZIP code: 8420
- PSGC: 1606716000
- IDD : area code: +63 (0)86
- Native languages: Surigaonon; Agusan; Cebuano; Tagalog

Pilar, officially the Municipality of Pilar (Surigaonon: Lungsod nan Pilar; Tagalog: Bayan ng Pilar), is a municipality in the province of Surigao del Norte, Philippines. According to the 2024 census, it has a population of 11,135 people.

It is located on Siargao Island, bounded by the municipality of San Isidro to the north, municipality of Del Carmen to the west, municipality of Dapa to south and Philippine Sea to the east. It used to be a barrio of Dapa until its creation as a separate municipality on October 31, 1953, by virtue of Executive Order No. 638 issued by then President Elpidio Quirino. Pilar has a natural harbor through a small inlet called Port Pilar.

== Geography ==
=== Barangays ===
Pilar is politically subdivided into 15 barangays. Each barangay consists of puroks while some have sitios.

- Asinan (Poblacion)
- Caridad
- Centro (Poblacion)
- Consolacion
- Datu
- Dayaohay
- Jaboy
- Katipunan
- Maasin
- Mabini
- Mabuhay
- Pilaring (Poblacion)
- Punta (Poblacion)
- Salvacion
- San Roque

=== Climate ===
Climate data for Pilar, Surigao del Norte
Month	Jan	Feb	Mar	Apr	May	Jun	Jul	Aug	Sep	Oct	Nov	Dec	Year
Mean daily maximum °C (°F)	27 (81)	27 (81)	28 (82)	29 (84)	30 (86)	29 (84)	30 (86)	30 (86)	30 (86)	29 (84)	29 (84)	28 (82)	29 (84)
Mean daily minimum °C (°F)	23 (73)	23 (73)	23 (73)	24 (75)	24 (75)	24 (75)	24 (75)	24 (75)	24 (75)	24 (75)	24 (75)	24 (75)	24 (75)
Average precipitation mm (inches)	161 (6.3)	132 (5.2)	112 (4.4)	87 (3.4)	136 (5.4)	169 (6.7)	146 (5.7)	148 (5.8)	132 (5.2)	156 (6.1)	176 (6.9)	170 (6.7)	1,725 (67.8)
Average rainy days	20.0	16.2	18.3	17.5	24.0	26.7	27.5	27.5	26.5	26.4	23.8	21.1	275.5
Source: Meteoblue

== Demographics ==
Population census of Pilar
Year	Pop.	±% p.a.
1960	5,227	—
1970	6,291	+1.87%
1975	7,504	+3.60%
1980	8,646	+2.87%
1990	7,873	−0.93%
1995	8,299	+0.99%
2000	8,401	+0.26%
2007	8,023	−0.63%
2010	9,456	+6.16%
2015	9,752	+0.59%
2020	10,374	+1.31%
2024	11,135	+1.71%
Source: Philippine Statistics Authority

=== Religion ===
Almost all inhabitant are Christians and majority follows Roman Catholicism. Pilar is a parish under the Roman Catholic Diocese of Surigao. The town got its name from its patron saint, Our Lady of the Pillar.

=== Language ===
Surigaonon is the local language. Cebuano, Filipino and English are also understood.

== Economy ==
Poverty incidence of Pilar (%)

Source: Philippine Statistics Authority

The town's economy is largely based on fishing and agriculture. Major agricultural produce are rice and coconut (copra).

== Tourism ==
Various homestay facilities are available in town for tourists.

=== Magpupungko Lagoons and Rock Formations ===
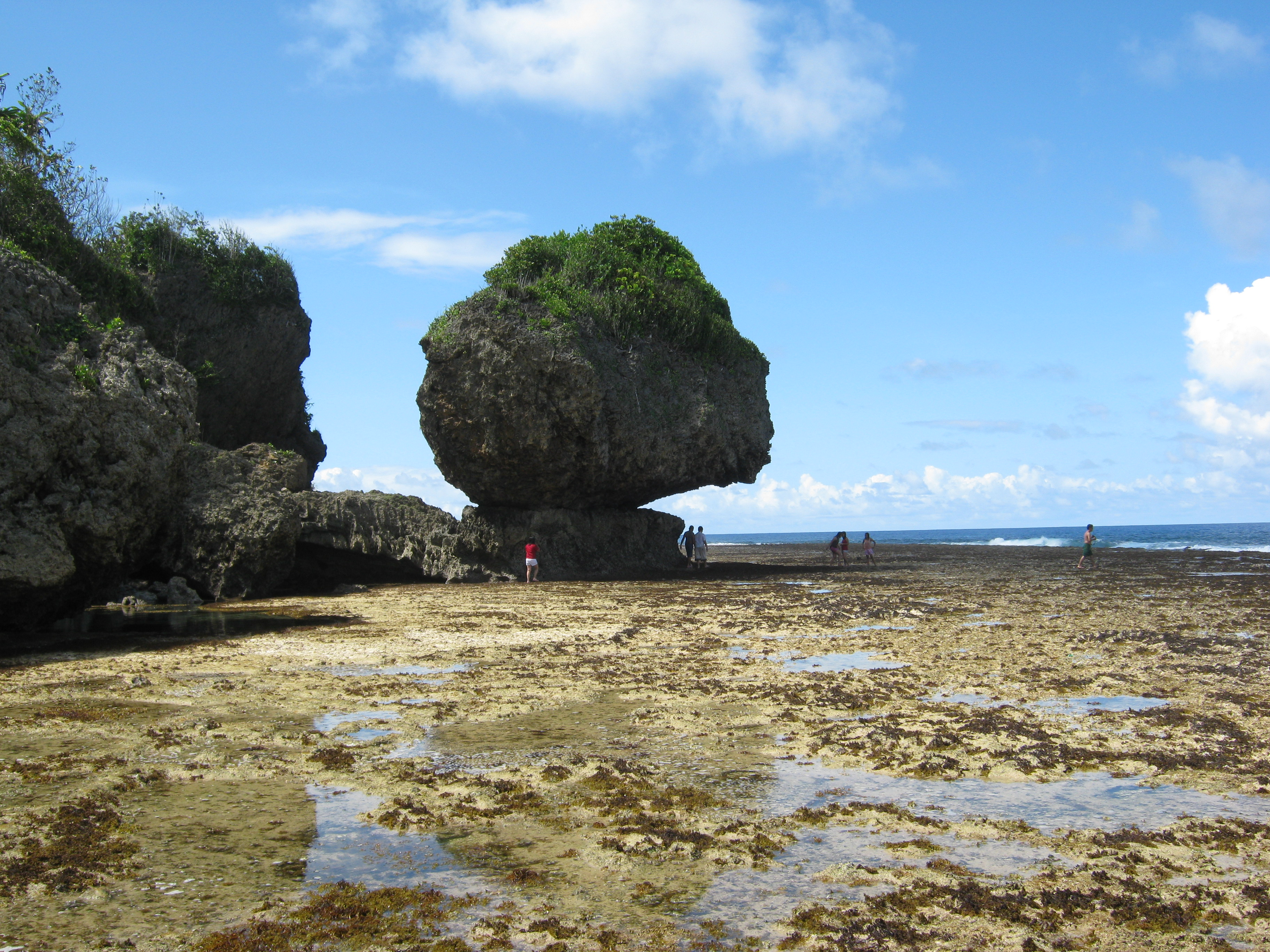
Magpupungko balancing rock

Magpupungko is the most popular tourist destination in Pilar. It is famous for its lagoons which can only be seen during low tide. It also features picturesque limestone rock formations, the most prominent of which is a large balancing rock from where the name "Magpupungko" comes from. It means "the one who sits", from the root word pungkò ("to sit in a squatting position").

=== Other Beaches and Rock Formations ===
Other areas that can be explored by tourists are Taglungnan Beach and Tagbayanga Islets, which are across town proper and can be reach in 15–20 minutes by boat ride. Other beaches are Lukod Beach and Caridad Beach.

=== Surfing ===
Pilar is also one of the surfing spots in Siargao and is less crowded. It is one and a half hour boat ride from General Luna, where the more popular surfing spot Cloud 9 is located. It holds many good lefts and is best surfed during NE swells. There are good breaks in front and near the town proper and in Barangay Caridad.

=== Game Fishing ===
Pilar is popular to game fishing enthusiasts. The town hosts an annual invitational sport fishing event dubbed as Siargao International Game Fishing Tournament.

=== Mangrove Forest ===
Pilar has an extensive mangrove forest reserve.

== Philippine Freshwater Crocodile ==
Thirty-six Philippine freshwater crocodile (Crocodylus mindorensis) were released in Paghongawan Marsh (misspelled by media as Paghowangan) in Barangay Jaboy last March 2013 as part of conservation effort to bolster the population of this endangered reptile. The released crocodiles are all yearlings and were bred in captivity. The marsh extends 300 acres (120 hectares) in the dry season and more than 1,500 acres (600 hectares) in the wet season. These crocodiles are not endemic to Siargao and are smaller compared to saltwater crocodiles which can be found in the western side of Siargao, in the mangrove forest of Del Carmen town.

== Infrastructure ==
=== Transportation ===
Pilar is connected to Surigao City through the Port of Dapa. Jeepneys ply between Pilar and Dapa daily. It is connected to Cebu City and Metro Manila through Sayak Airport in the adjacent Municipality of Del Carmen. Habal-habal (motorcycle) can also be rented to service transportation needs.

=== Healthcare ===
Pilar has a district hospital but now mostly serve lying-in and maternity services. There is also a rural health center in the town proper.

=== Telecommunications ===
The Philippine Long Distance Telephone Company provides fixed line services. Wireless mobile communications services are provided by Smart Communications and Globe Telecommunications.

== Education ==
Pilar is served by 2 high schools, Pilar National High School in the town proper and Pilar National High School - Caridad Annex in its biggest barangay, Caridad. There are also 12 elementary schools led by Pilar Central Elementary School.
