= Surigao del Norte's 1st congressional district =

Legislative district of the Philippines

- Constituency for the House of Representatives of the Philippines
- Map
- Location of Surigao del Norte within the Philippines
- Province: Surigao del Norte
- Region: Caraga
- Population: 128,117 (2020)
- Electorate: 104,691 (2022)
- Major settlements: 9 LGUs: Municipalities; Burgos; Dapa; Del Carmen; General Luna; Pilar; San Benito; San Isidro; Santa Monica; Socorro
- Area: 622.56 km^{2} (240.37 sq mi)

Current constituency
- Created: 1987
- Representative: Francisco Matugas
- Political party: Lakas–CMD; PS
- Congressional bloc: Majority

Surigao del Norte's 1st congressional district is one of the two congressional districts of the Philippines in the province of Surigao del Norte. It has been represented in the House of Representatives since 1987. The district encompasses the island chains off the northeast coast of mainland Surigao del Norte. Since the 2007 redistricting following the separation of Dinagat Islands, the district now comprises the Siargao and Bucas Grande municipalities of Burgos, Dapa, Del Carmen, General Luna, Pilar, San Benito, San Isidro, Santa Monica and Socorro. It also included Dinagat Islands until it was established as a distinct province in 2006. It is currently represented in the 20th Congress by Francisco Matugas of the Lakas–CMD and Padajon Surigao.

== Representation history ==
#	Image	Member	Term of office		Congress	Party	Electoral history	Constituent LGUs
#	Image	Member	Start	End	Congress	Party	Electoral history	Constituent LGUs
=== Surigao del Norte's 1st district for the House of Representatives of the Philippines ===
District created February 2, 1987 from Surigao del Norte's at-large district.
1		Glenda B. Ecleo	July 28, 1987	June 30, 1995	8th	UNIDO	Elected in 1987. Oath taking deferred.	1987–1992; Basilisa, Burgos, Cagdianao, Dapa, Del Carmen, Dinagat, General Luna, Libjo, Loreto, Pilar, San Benito, San Isidro, Santa Monica, Socorro, Tubajon
1		Glenda B. Ecleo	July 28, 1987	June 30, 1995	9th	Lakas	Re-elected in 1992.	1992–2007; Basilisa, Burgos, Cagdianao, Dapa, Del Carmen, Dinagat, General Luna, Libjo, Loreto, Pilar, San Benito, San Isidro, San Jose, Santa Monica, Socorro, Tubajon
2		Constantino H. Navarro Jr.	June 30, 1995	June 30, 2001	10th	Lakas	Elected in 1995.	1992–2007; Basilisa, Burgos, Cagdianao, Dapa, Del Carmen, Dinagat, General Luna, Libjo, Loreto, Pilar, San Benito, San Isidro, San Jose, Santa Monica, Socorro, Tubajon
2		Constantino H. Navarro Jr.	June 30, 1995	June 30, 2001	11th	LAMMP	Re-elected in 1998.	1992–2007; Basilisa, Burgos, Cagdianao, Dapa, Del Carmen, Dinagat, General Luna, Libjo, Loreto, Pilar, San Benito, San Isidro, San Jose, Santa Monica, Socorro, Tubajon
(1)		Glenda B. Ecleo	June 30, 2001	June 30, 2007	12th	Lakas	Elected in 2001.	1992–2007; Basilisa, Burgos, Cagdianao, Dapa, Del Carmen, Dinagat, General Luna, Libjo, Loreto, Pilar, San Benito, San Isidro, San Jose, Santa Monica, Socorro, Tubajon
(1)		Glenda B. Ecleo	June 30, 2001	June 30, 2007	13th	Lakas	Re-elected in 2004. Redistricted to Dinagat Islands's at-large district.	1992–2007; Basilisa, Burgos, Cagdianao, Dapa, Del Carmen, Dinagat, General Luna, Libjo, Loreto, Pilar, San Benito, San Isidro, San Jose, Santa Monica, Socorro, Tubajon
3		Francisco Matugas	June 30, 2007	June 30, 2016	14th	KAMPI (PS)	Elected in 2007.	1992–2007; Basilisa, Burgos, Cagdianao, Dapa, Del Carmen, Dinagat, General Luna, Libjo, Loreto, Pilar, San Benito, San Isidro, San Jose, Santa Monica, Socorro, Tubajon
3		Francisco Matugas	June 30, 2007	June 30, 2016	14th	Lakas (PS)	Elected in 2007.	2007–present Burgos, Dapa, Del Carmen, General Luna, Pilar, San Benito, San Isidro, Santa Monica, Socorro
3		Francisco Matugas	June 30, 2007	June 30, 2016	15th	Liberal (PS)	Re-elected in 2010.	2007–present Burgos, Dapa, Del Carmen, General Luna, Pilar, San Benito, San Isidro, Santa Monica, Socorro
3		Francisco Matugas	June 30, 2007	June 30, 2016	16th	Liberal (PS)	Re-elected in 2013.	2007–present Burgos, Dapa, Del Carmen, General Luna, Pilar, San Benito, San Isidro, Santa Monica, Socorro
4		Francisco Jose Matugas II	June 30, 2016	June 30, 2025	17th	Liberal (PS)	Elected in 2016.	2007–present Burgos, Dapa, Del Carmen, General Luna, Pilar, San Benito, San Isidro, Santa Monica, Socorro
4		Francisco Jose Matugas II	June 30, 2016	June 30, 2025	18th	PDP–Laban (PS)	Re-elected in 2019.	2007–present Burgos, Dapa, Del Carmen, General Luna, Pilar, San Benito, San Isidro, Santa Monica, Socorro
4		Francisco Jose Matugas II	June 30, 2016	June 30, 2025	19th	Lakas (PS)	Re-elected in 2022	2007–present Burgos, Dapa, Del Carmen, General Luna, Pilar, San Benito, San Isidro, Santa Monica, Socorro
(3)		Francisco Matugas	June 30, 2025	Incumbent	20th	Lakas–CMD (PS)	Elected in 2025.	2007–present Burgos, Dapa, Del Carmen, General Luna, Pilar, San Benito, San Isidro, Santa Monica, Socorro

== See also ==
- Legislative districts of Surigao del Norte
