= San Benito, Surigao del Norte =

Municipality in Surigao del Norte, Philippines

San Benito
- Municipality
- Municipality of San Benito
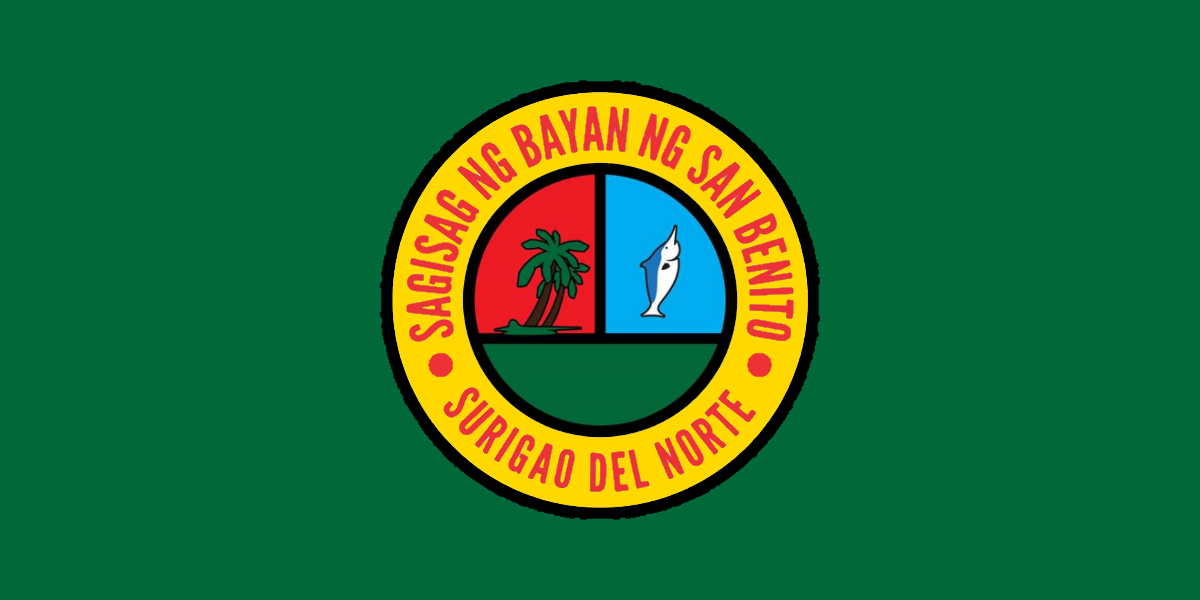
- Flag

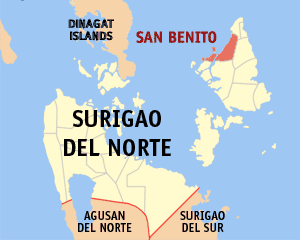
- Map of Surigao del Norte with San Benito highlighted
- Interactive map of San Benito
- Location within the Philippines
- Coordinates: 9°57′29″N 126°00′25″E
- Country: Philippines
- Region: Caraga
- Province: Surigao del Norte
- District: 1st district
- Founded: September 17, 1971
- Named for: Saint Benedict of Nursia
- Barangays: 6 (see Barangays)

Government
  - Type: Sangguniang Bayan
  - Mayor: Maria Gina S. Menil (LAKAS)
  - Vice Mayor: Emmanuel S. Menil (LAKAS)
  - Representative: Francisco Jose F. Matugas II
  - Councilor: Members: Charlito E. Mendavia LAKAS); Felix B. Sumando (LAKAS); Rosebie S. Rivas LAKAS); Elmer Q. Poculan (LAKAS); Aldrein C. Glimane (LAKAS); Delfin P. Labola (LAKAS); Cindy Khenn R. Agati (NP); Robert P. Borja LAKAS)
  - Electorate: 5,750 voters (2025)

Area
  - Total: 45.63 km^{2} (17.62 sq mi)
- Elevation: 20 m (66 ft)
- Highest elevation: 204 m (669 ft)
- Lowest elevation: 0 m (0 ft)

Population (2024 census)
  - Total: 5,880
  - Density: 129/km^{2} (334/sq mi)
  - Households: 1,339

Economy
  - Income class: 5th municipal income class
  - Poverty incidence: 15.3% (2023)
  - Revenue: ₱ 83.03 million (2024)
  - Assets: ₱ 264.1 million (2024)
  - Expenditure: ₱ 82.5 million (2024)
  - Liabilities: ₱ 87.91 million (2024)

Service provider
  - Electricity: Siargao Electric Cooperative (SIARELCO)
- Time zone: UTC+8 (PST)
- ZIP code: 8423
- PSGC: 1606718000
- IDD : area code: +63 (0)86
- Native languages: Surigaonon; Agusan; Cebuano; Tagalog
- Website: sanbenito.gov.ph

San Benito, officially the Municipality of San Benito (Surigaonon: Lungsod nan San Benito; Tagalog: Bayan ng San Benito), is a municipality in the province of Surigao del Norte, Philippines. According to the 2024 census, it has a population of 5,880 people.

== Etymology ==
San Benito is derived from the Spanish for Saint Benedict, the town's patron saint. A chapel was built in the area and had hosted the saint's relic. It was previously named Talisay, after the namesake trees (Terminalia catappa) that grew abundantly in the area.

== History ==
San Benito traces its origin as a barrio of the town of Sapao (now Sta. Monica). When Sapao was reverted to a barrio and became part of Numancia (now Del Carmen), San Benito also became part of Numancia and its largest barrio.

Surigao del Norte Representative Constantino Navarro Sr. authored and sponsored a bill to create San Benito as a municipality. The creation of the municipality was formalized on September 17, 1971, out of five barrios from the municipalities of Del Carmen and Sta. Monica, by virtue of Republic Act No. 6396.

== Geography ==
=== Barangays ===
San Benito is politically subdivided into 6 barangays. Each barangay consists of puroks while some have sitios.

- Bongdo
- Maribojoc
- Nuevo Campo
- San Juan
- Santa Cruz (Poblacion)
- Talisay (Poblacion)

=== Climate ===
Climate data for San Benito, Surigao del Norte
Month	Jan	Feb	Mar	Apr	May	Jun	Jul	Aug	Sep	Oct	Nov	Dec	Year
Mean daily maximum °C (°F)	27 (81)	28 (82)	28 (82)	30 (86)	30 (86)	30 (86)	29 (84)	30 (86)	30 (86)	29 (84)	29 (84)	28 (82)	29 (84)
Mean daily minimum °C (°F)	23 (73)	23 (73)	23 (73)	23 (73)	25 (77)	25 (77)	25 (77)	25 (77)	25 (77)	25 (77)	24 (75)	24 (75)	24 (75)
Average precipitation mm (inches)	210 (8.3)	161 (6.3)	123 (4.8)	85 (3.3)	148 (5.8)	186 (7.3)	164 (6.5)	157 (6.2)	141 (5.6)	190 (7.5)	223 (8.8)	200 (7.9)	1,988 (78.3)
Average rainy days	21.0	16.8	18.5	18.2	24.9	27.7	28.4	27.0	26.1	27.6	24.6	22.0	282.8
Source: Meteoblue

== Demographics ==
Population census of San Benito
Year	Pop.	±% p.a.
1975	3,202	—
1980	3,748	+3.20%
1990	4,315	+1.42%
1995	4,498	+0.78%
2000	4,750	+1.18%
2007	5,275	+1.46%
2010	5,505	+1.57%
2015	5,404	−0.35%
2020	5,663	+0.99%
2024	5,880	+0.91%
Source: Philippine Statistics Authority

== Economy ==
Poverty incidence of San Benito (%)

Source: Philippine Statistics Authority

San Benito is one of Siargao Island's richest fishing grounds. Fishing ranks second as the locals' source of income. Products of the municipality include coconut trees, copra, fish, and other agricultural crops like cassava, sweet potato (kamote), taro (gabi), rice, root crops, and corn.

Being on Siargao Island, the town is also a tourist destination, with attractions such as the Poneas Hilltop Hidden Lake, Kangkangon White Beach, Pagbasayan Islet, Litalit Islet, and Camblinling Naked Island.
