= Robert Lyndon Barbers =

Filipino politician

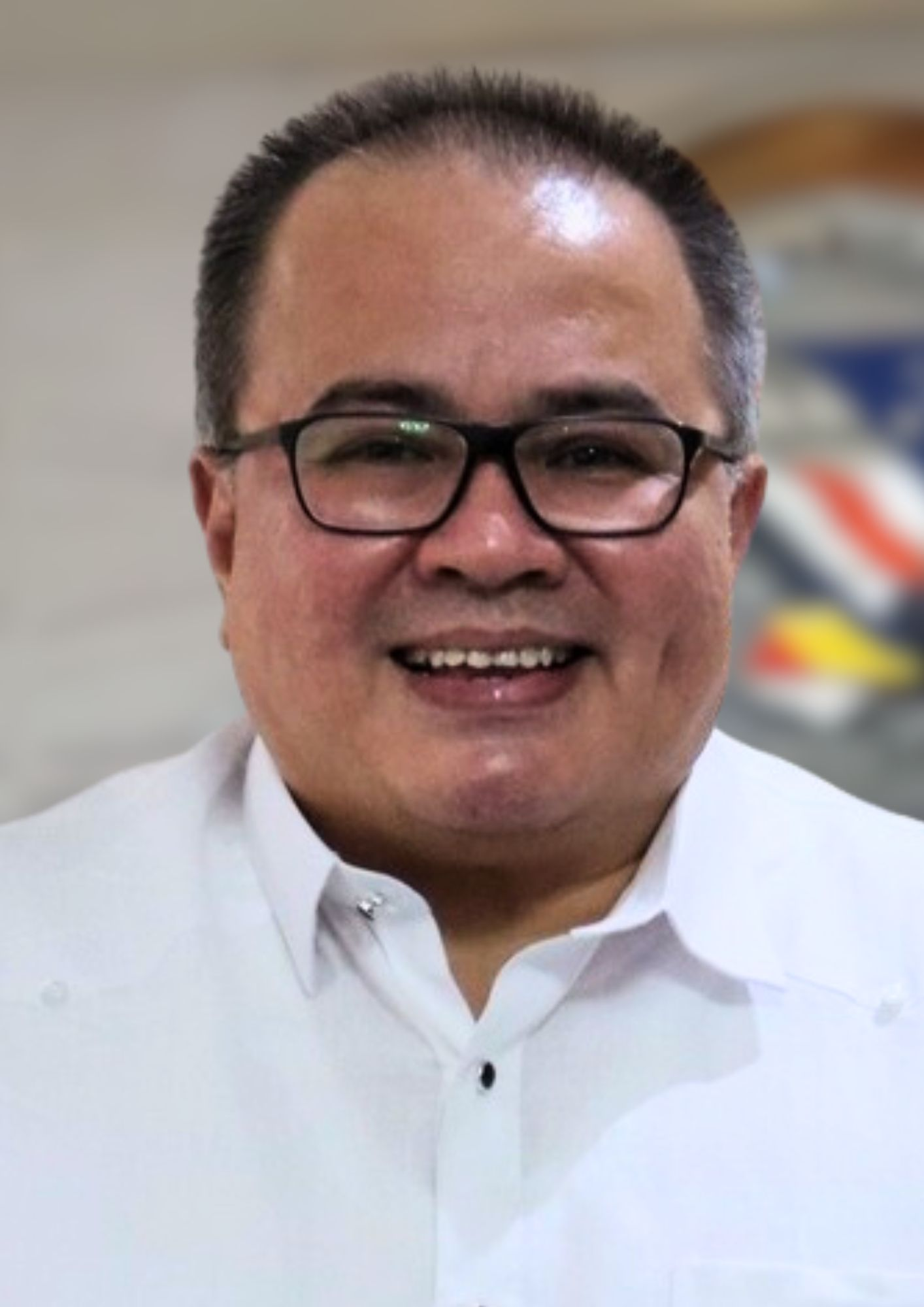
- Barbers in 2023

Governor of Surigao del Norte
- Incumbent
- Assumed office June 30, 2022
- Vice Governor: Eddie Gokiangkee Jr.
- Preceded by: Francisco Matugas
- In office June 30, 2001 – June 30, 2007
- Vice Governor: Rodolfo Navarro
- Preceded by: Francisco Matugas
- Succeeded by: Ace Barbers

Personal details
- Born: Robert Lyndon Smith Barbers; July 15, 1968 (age 58)
- Party: Nacionalista (2012–present)
- Other political affiliations: Lakas (2001–2012)
- Spouse: Mary Joyce C. Barbers
- Occupation: Politician

Robert Lyndon Smith Barbers is a Filipino politician who is governor of Surigao del Norte.

== Early life ==
Robert Lyndon Smith Barbers was born on July 15, 1968.

== Career ==
Barbers was first elected as governor of Surigao del Norte in 2001. His first year of governorship is maarked by an anti-illegal drugs campaign launching operations against drug syndicates in the province. He was the province executive until 2007.

In the 2007 elections, he ran for the position of House of Representatives member for Surigao del Norte's 2nd district, a position held by his brother Ace Barbers but lost.

In 2017, charges were filed against Barbers over his alleged links to the Fertilizer Fund scam in 2004. It was dismissed within the year, a decision affirmed in 2018.

He was elected Surigao del Norte governor again in the 2022 elections.

== Personal life ==
Robert Lyndon Barbers is married to Mary Joyce C. Barbers.
