= Igorot Stone Kingdom =

Cultural theme park in Baguio, Philippines

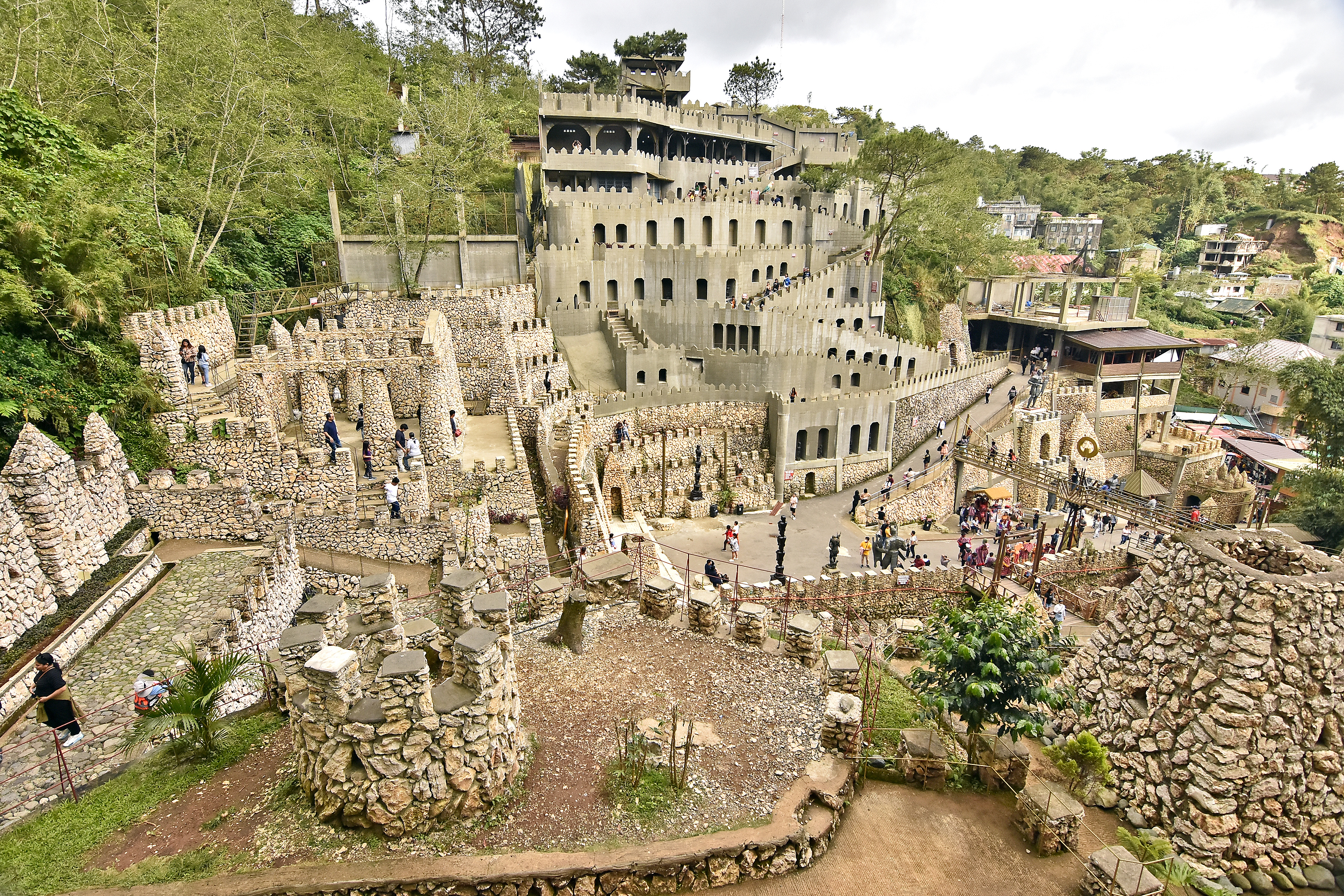
- A view of the Igorot Stone Kingdom in Baguio
- Interactive map of Igorot Stone Kingdom
- Location: Longlong Road, Pinsao Proper, Baguio, Philippines
- Coordinates: 16.431689°N 120.575128°E
- Status: Operating
- Opened: May 2021
- Owner: Pio Velasco
- Theme: Cordilleran stonework and folklore
- Area: 6,000 m^{2} (65,000 sq ft)

Igorot Stone Kingdom is a cultural theme park and tourist attraction in Baguio, Philippines. Built in 2021 by engineer Pio Velasco, it features stone structures inspired by Cordilleran engineering traditions and folklore. The park gained attention for its distinctive riprap-style stone walling and for representing elements of Igorot culture. It temporarily closed in 2022 due to permit and safety concerns but later reopened in 2023 after compliance with city regulations.

== History ==
=== Initial opening ===
Construction of Igorot Stone Kingdom began in 2020, during the COVID-19 community quarantine. According to reports, Velasco commissioned the park to highlight Igorot craftsmanship and to serve as a tribute to his mother, whom he described as a strong Cordilleran woman. The park opened to the public in May 2021 and quickly became one of Baguio’s most visited attractions.

Covering about 6,000 square meters (1.5 acres) along Longlong Road in Barangay Pinsao Proper, the site includes stone towers, terraces, and sculptures that blend traditional Cordilleran motifs with modern design.

=== Closure ===
In November 2022, Baguio City Mayor Benjamin Magalong ordered the temporary closure of the Igorot Stone Kingdom after the local government found that it was operating without the necessary business and building permits.

An assessment by the Asian Development Bank and the City Disaster Risk Reduction and Management Office classified the park’s location as having very high landslide exposure, while the Mines and Geosciences Bureau identified the area as prone to erosion.

City officials also noted that some stone structures were built without structural reinforcements.

The closure order followed several notices of violation issued earlier that year by the City Buildings and Architecture Office, which later filed a complaint for alleged violation of the National Building Code.

=== Legal proceedings and reopening ===
In March 2023, the Baguio City Prosecutor’s Office dismissed the criminal charges filed against the park’s owners for lack of merit, concluding that the required permits and compliance documents had been submitted.

Following the decision, the Baguio City government issued a provisional permit allowing the Igorot Stone Kingdom to reopen in April 2023, subject to several conditions including slope stability studies, a traffic management plan, and disclaimers clarifying that its displays were artistic representations rather than specific indigenous structures. The reopening was also confirmed by local media reports.

== Description ==
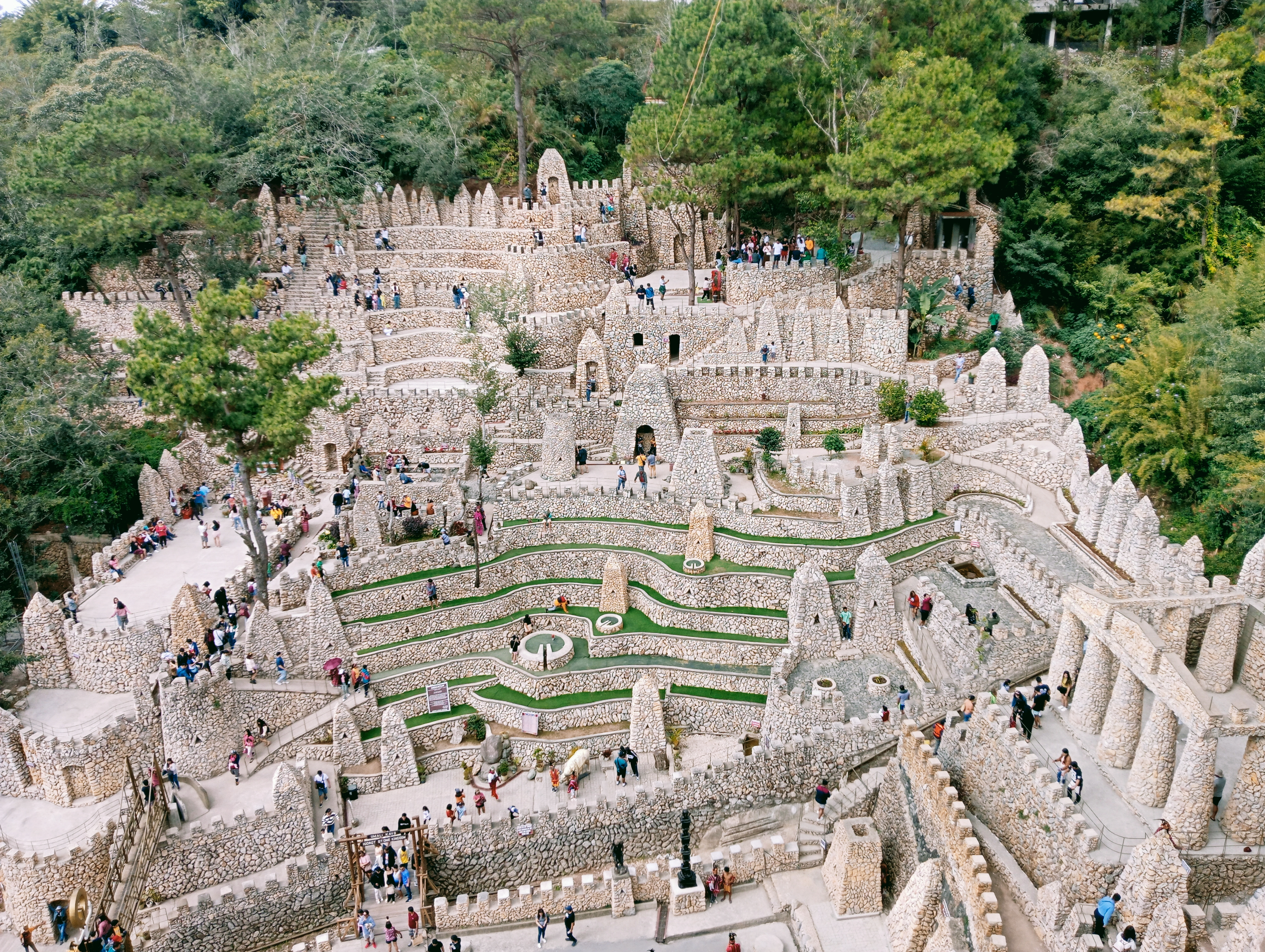
Aerial view of the Igorot Stone Kingdom

The Igorot Stone Kingdom is built on a mountainside property using riprap construction, a traditional Cordilleran technique where rocks and boulders are interlocked without mortar. For stability and safety, cement was later added between stones. The park features stone walls, towers, bridges, and statues representing Igorot myths and deities such as Kabunian, as well as structures inspired by the Banaue Rice Terraces.

While described as a fantasy-inspired park, its design draws heavily on indigenous architecture and aims to promote awareness of Igorot culture and craftsmanship.

== Cultural significance ==
Local and national media have identified the Igorot Stone Kingdom as a popular local tourist attraction contributing to Baguio’s post-pandemic tourism recovery. It has also been cited by the city council for promoting local culture and providing employment during the pandemic period.

== See also ==
- List of tourist attractions in the Philippines
