= Governor of Surigao del Norte =

Local chief executive

Provincial Governor of Surigao del Norte
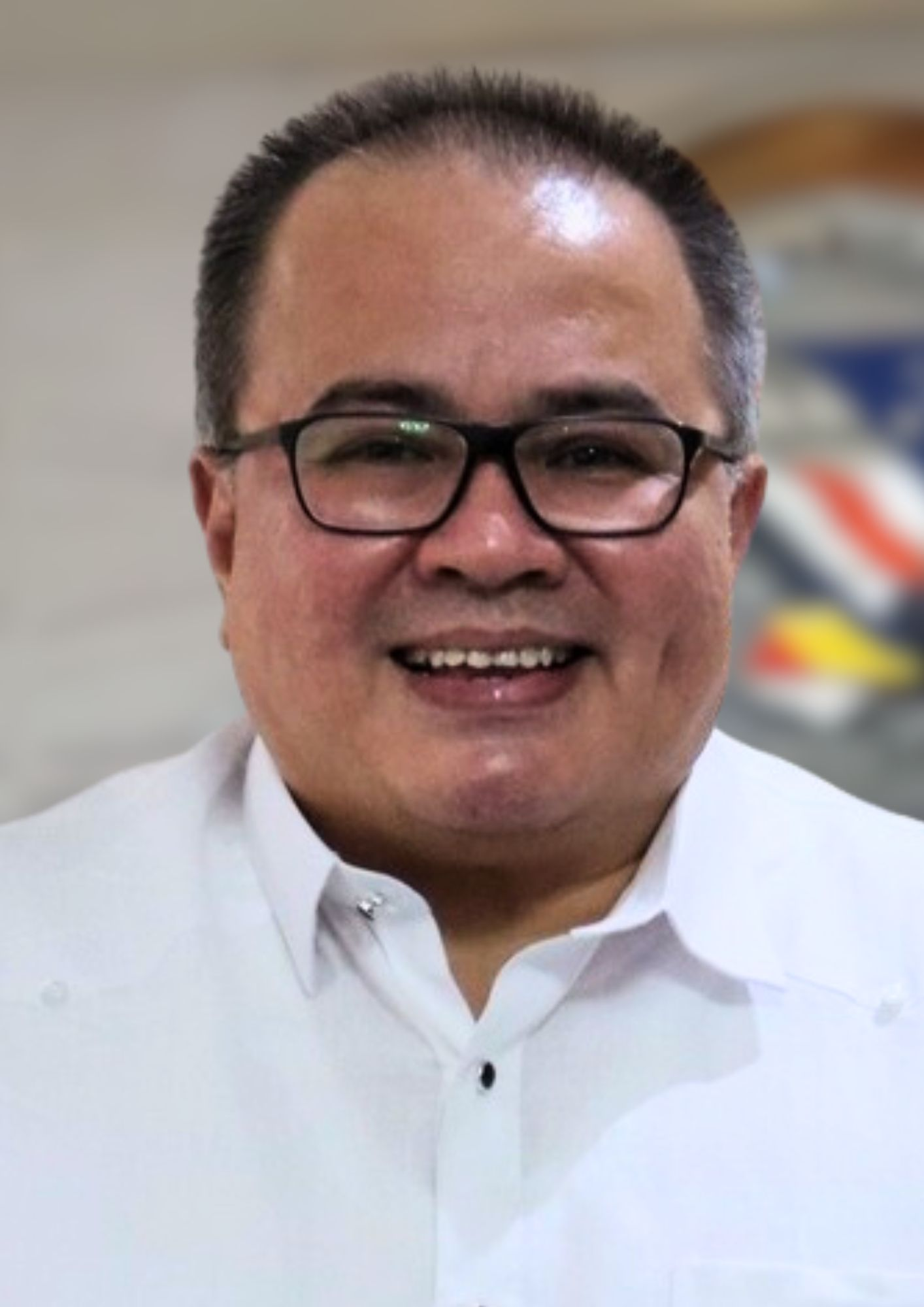
- Incumbent; Robert Lyndon Barbers since June 30, 2022
- Appointer: Elected via popular vote
- Term length: 3 years
- Inaugural holder: Constantino Navarro Sr.
- Formation: 160

The governor of Surigao del Norte (Filipino: Punong Panlalawigan ng Surigao del Norte), is the chief executive of the provincial government of Surigao del Norte.

== Provincial Governors of Surigao (1899-1960) ==
| | Governor | Term |
|---|---|---|
| 1 | Juan Gonzales | 1899 |
| 2 | Wenceslao Gonzales | 1900 |
| 3 | Prudencio Garcia Sr. | 1901-1903 |
| 4 | Daniel Toribio Sison | 1904-1908 |
| 5 | Rafael E. Eliot Sr. | 1909-1912 |
| 6 | Pio Kaimo | 1913-1916 |
| 7 | Perfecto S. de los Reyes | 1917-1919 |
| 8 | Ricaredo Gonzales | 1920-1922 |
| 9 | Pedro A. Coleto | 1923-1931 |
| 10 | Jose M. Vasquez | 1932-1936 |
| (9) | Pedro A. Coleto | 1937-1939 |
| 11 | Fernando P. Silvosa | 1952-1955 |
| 12 | Protolico P. Egay Sr. | 1944-1945 |
| 13 | Vicente L. Pimentel | 1946-1951 |
| (11) | Fernando P. Silvosa | 1952-1955 |
| 14 | Bernardino O. Almeda | 1956-1959 |

== Provincial Governors of Surigao del Norte (1960-present) ==
| No. | Image | Governor | Term |
|---|---|---|---|
| 1 | | Constantino Navarro Sr. | 1960-1965 |
| 2 | | Jose Sering | 1965-1980 |
| 3 | | Rolando Geotina | 1980-1986 |
| 4 | | Wencelito Andanar | 1986-1988 |
| 5 | | Moises E. Ecleo | 1988-1992 |
| 6 | | Francisco Matugas | 1992-2001 |
| 7 | | Robert Lyndon Barbers | 2001-2007 |
| 8 | | Ace Barbers | 2007-2010 |
| 9 | | Sol Matugas | 2010-2019 |
| (6) | | Francisco Matugas | 2019-2022 |
| (7) | | Robert Lyndon Barbers | 2022–present |
