= Santa Monica, Surigao del Norte =

Municipality in Surigao del Norte, Philippines

Santa Monica Sapao
- Municipality
- Municipality of Sta. Monica
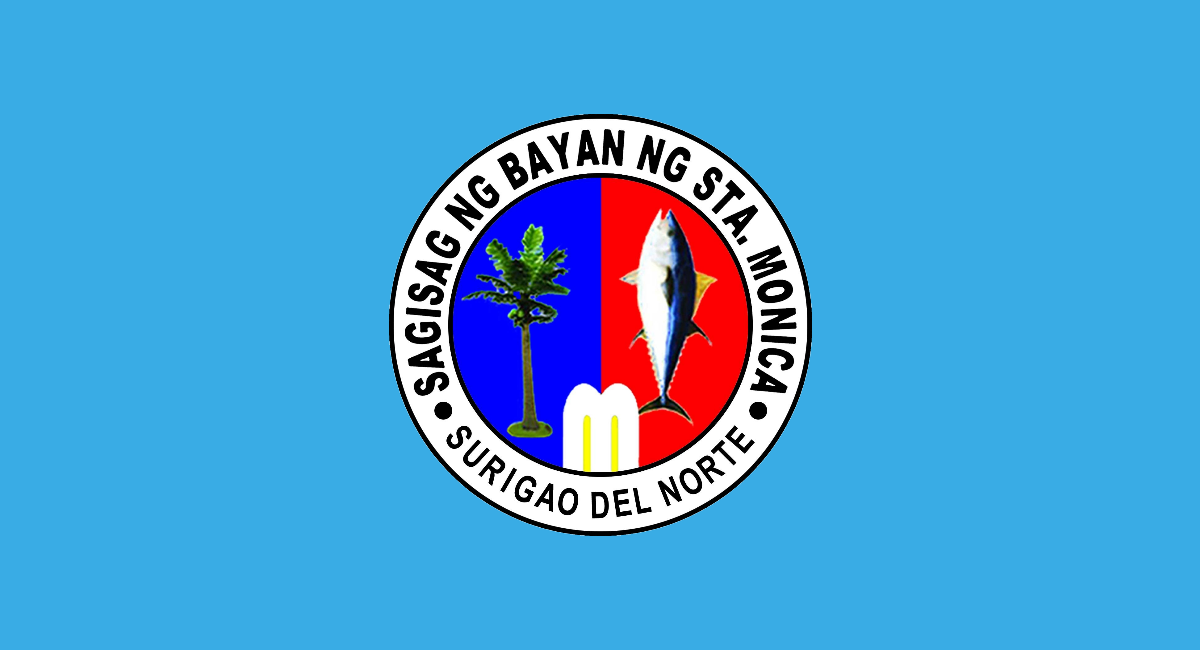
- Flag

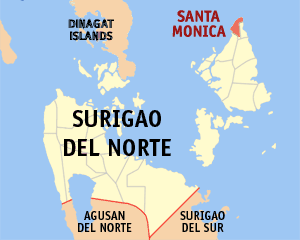
- Map of Surigao del Norte with Santa Monica highlighted
- Interactive map of Santa Monica
- Location within the Philippines
- Coordinates: 10°01′12″N 126°02′17″E
- Country: Philippines
- Region: Caraga
- Province: Surigao del Norte
- District: 1st district
- Renamed (as Santa Monica): June 17, 1967
- Named for: Saint Monica
- Barangays: 11 (see Barangays)

Government
  - Type: Sangguniang Bayan
  - Mayor: Ricardo L. Lasco (NP)
  - Vice Mayor: Mario A. Virtudazo (NP)
  - Representative: Francisco Jose T. Matugas (LAKAS)
  - Electorate: 9,709 voters (2025)

Area
  - Total: 39.19 km^{2} (15.13 sq mi)
- Elevation: 21 m (69 ft)
- Highest elevation: 183 m (600 ft)
- Lowest elevation: 0 m (0 ft)

Population (2024 census)
  - Total: 9,757
  - Density: 249.0/km^{2} (644.8/sq mi)
  - Households: 2,321

Economy
  - Income class: 5th municipal income class
  - Poverty incidence: 14.07% (2023)
  - Revenue: ₱ 92.22 million (2024)
  - Assets: ₱ 256.5 million (2024)
  - Expenditure: ₱ 86.02 million (2024)
  - Liabilities: ₱ 18.17 million (2024)

Service provider
  - Electricity: Siargao Electric Cooperative (SIARELCO)
- Time zone: UTC+8 (PST)
- ZIP code: 8422
- PSGC: 1606721000
- IDD : area code: +63 (0)86
- Native languages: Surigaonon; Agusan; Cebuano; Tagalog

Santa Monica, officially the Municipality of Sta. Monica (Surigaonon: Lungsod nan Santa Monica; Tagalog: Bayan ng Santa Monica), is a municipality in the province of Surigao del Norte, Philippines. According to the 2024 census, it has a population of 9,757 people.

It is also known as Sapao. Santa Monica is one of the two northernmost towns of Siargao Island. The other is the municipality of Burgos.

Although many sources refer to it as "Santa Monica" it is officially named "Sta. Monica".

== Etymology ==
Santa Monica is named after its patron saint, Saint Monica, in shortened Spanish term. It was originally known as Sapao, a name given by the first Spaniards who reached the area. According to one version of the story, a fisherman, upon being asked by the Spaniards about the name of the place, replied "no sapao," meaning he missed catching the school of fish. Another version suggests that a fisherman responded "sapao," meaning his banca was full of fish.

== History ==
Santa Monica was originally known as a pueblo (town) named Sapao during the Spanish regime. Eventually, Sapao was reverted into a barrio, part of the municipality of Numancia (now Del Carmen). It regained its municipal status on October 1, 1953, by virtue of Executive Order No. 623. It then consisted of barrios Alegria, Baybay, Bailan, Bitaug, Burgos, Cabugsan, Libertad, Rizal, and Sapao.

On June 17, 1967, the municipality of Sapao was renamed Santa Monica and five barrios, including Burgos, and three sitios were separated from it to form the new municipality of Burgos.

== Geography ==
=== Barangays ===
Santa Monica is politically subdivided into 11 barangays. Each barangay consists of puroks while some have sitios.

- Abad Santos
- Alegria
- Bailan
- Garcia
- Libertad
- Mabini
- Mabuhay (Poblacion)
- Magsaysay
- Rizal
- T. Arlan (Poblacion)
- Tangbo

=== Climate ===
Climate data for Santa Monica, Surigao del Norte
Month	Jan	Feb	Mar	Apr	May	Jun	Jul	Aug	Sep	Oct	Nov	Dec	Year
Mean daily maximum °C (°F)	27 (81)	27 (81)	28 (82)	29 (84)	30 (86)	29 (84)	30 (86)	30 (86)	30 (86)	29 (84)	29 (84)	28 (82)	29 (84)
Mean daily minimum °C (°F)	23 (73)	23 (73)	23 (73)	24 (75)	24 (75)	24 (75)	24 (75)	24 (75)	24 (75)	24 (75)	24 (75)	23 (73)	24 (74)
Average precipitation mm (inches)	161 (6.3)	132 (5.2)	112 (4.4)	87 (3.4)	136 (5.4)	169 (6.7)	146 (5.7)	148 (5.8)	132 (5.2)	156 (6.1)	176 (6.9)	170 (6.7)	1,725 (67.8)
Average rainy days	21.0	16.8	18.5	18.2	24.9	27.7	28.4	27.0	26.1	27.6	24.6	22.0	282.8
Source: Meteoblue

== Demographics ==
Population census of Santa Monica
Year	Pop.	±% p.a.
1903	1,462	—
1960	6,522	+2.66%
1970	5,438	−1.80%
1975	5,993	+1.97%
1980	6,272	+0.91%
1990	7,167	+1.34%
1995	7,219	+0.14%
2000	7,757	+1.55%
2007	7,916	+0.28%
2010	8,715	+3.56%
2015	8,808	+0.20%
2020	9,423	+1.43%
2024	9,757	+0.84%
Source: Philippine Statistics Authority

== Economy ==
Poverty incidence of Santa Monica (%)

Source: Philippine Statistics Authority
