= Burgos, Surigao del Norte =

Municipality in Surigao del Norte, Philippines

Burgos Unidad
- Municipality
- Municipality of Burgos
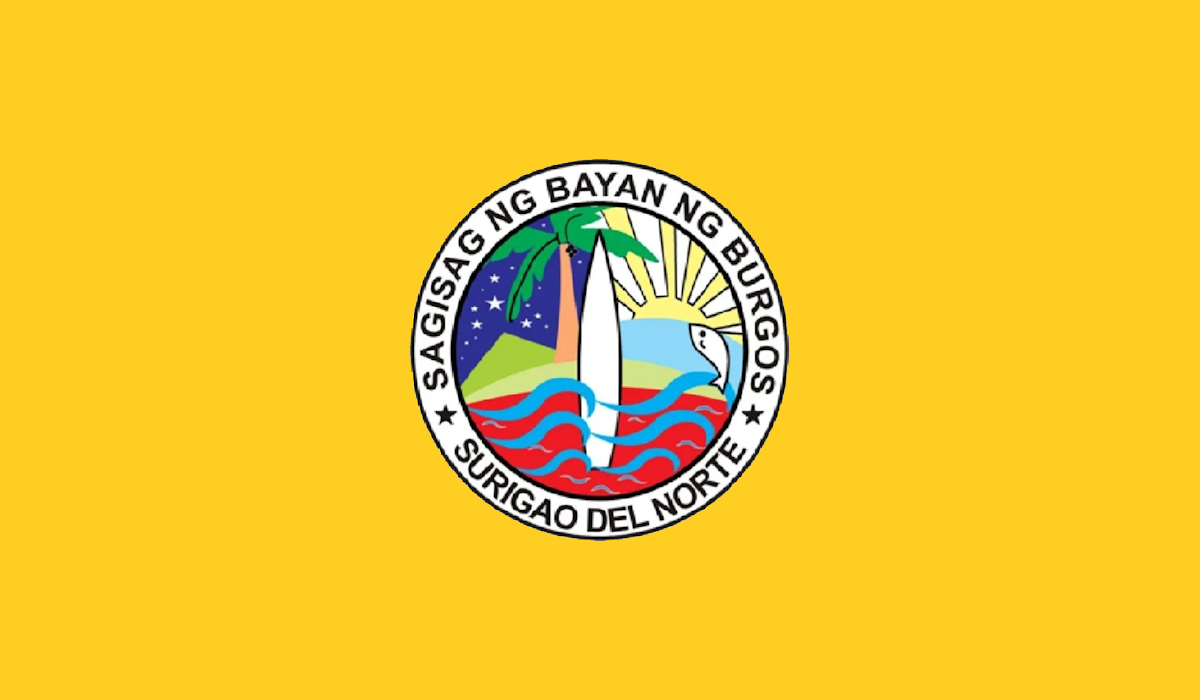
- Flag

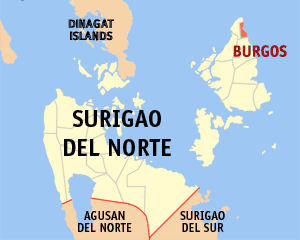
- Map of Surigao del Norte with Burgos highlighted
- Interactive map of Burgos
- Location within the Philippines
- Coordinates: 10°01′05″N 126°04′26″E
- Country: Philippines
- Region: Caraga
- Province: Surigao del Norte
- District: 1st district
- Founded: November 29, 1965
- Disestablished: February 17, 1966
- Reestablished: June 17, 1967
- Named for: Jose Burgos
- Barangays: 6 (see Barangays)

Government
  - Type: Sangguniang Bayan
  - Mayor: Emmanuel N. Arcena (LAKAS)
  - Vice Mayor: Anielyn B. Noguerraza (LAKAS)
  - Representative: Francisco Jose F. Matugas II
  - Councilor: Members: Renato A. Nogaliza (NP); Charie May B. Pomoy (LAKAS); Jey Marr E. Virtudazo (LAKAS); Chona M. Goña (LAKAS); Beberly E. Goña (LAKAS); Pedrita M. Domiños (LAKAS); Roger M. Pomoy (LAKAS); Edgardo M. Galagar (LAKAS)
  - Electorate: 4,501 voters (2025)

Area
  - Total: 19.27 km^{2} (7.44 sq mi)
- Elevation: 24 m (79 ft)
- Highest elevation: 183 m (600 ft)
- Lowest elevation: 0 m (0 ft)

Population (2024 census)
  - Total: 4,399
  - Density: 228.3/km^{2} (591.2/sq mi)
  - Households: 1,083

Economy
  - Income class: 5th municipal income class
  - Poverty incidence: 11.87% (2023)
  - Revenue: ₱ 78.28 million (2024)
  - Assets: ₱ 207.1 million (2024)
  - Expenditure: ₱ 73.61 million (2024)
  - Liabilities: ₱ 26.41 million (2024)

Service provider
  - Electricity: Siargao Electric Cooperative (SIARELCO)
- Time zone: UTC+8 (PST)
- ZIP code: 8424
- PSGC: 1606704000
- IDD : area code: +63 (0)86
- Native languages: Surigaonon; Agusan; Cebuano; Tagalog
- Website: www.burgos.gov.ph

Burgos, officially the Municipality of Burgos (Surigaonon: Lungsod nan Burgos; Tagalog: Bayan ng Burgos), is a municipality in the province of Surigao del Norte, Philippines. According to the 2024 census, it has a population of 4,399 people.

It is the smallest municipality in the province, both in population and area. Burgos is one of the two northernmost towns of Siargao Island. The other is municipality of Santa Monica.

== History ==
Burgos was formerly a sitio known as Sipan and later Unidad. It was later renamed as Burgos when it became a barrio of the municipality of Numancia (now Del Carmen) in 1925, and later Sapao (now Sta. Monica).

Burgos was converted into a town on November 29, 1965, but only lasted until February 17, 1966, as a result of an injunction filed by former Vice President Emmanuel Pelaez before the Supreme Court of the Philippines regarding the 77 newly created towns in the country. On June 17, 1967, Burgos was re-created as a municipality, consisting of barrios Burgos, Baybay, Bitang, Sipan, and San Mateo and sitios Patag, Natin-ao, and Mataub.

== Geography ==
=== Barangays ===
Burgos is politically subdivided into 6 barangays. Each barangay consists of puroks while some have sitios.

- Baybay
- Bitaug
- Matin-ao
- Poblacion 1
- Poblacion 2
- San Mateo

=== Climate ===
Climate data for Burgos, Surigao del Norte
Month	Jan	Feb	Mar	Apr	May	Jun	Jul	Aug	Sep	Oct	Nov	Dec	Year
Mean daily maximum °C (°F)	27 (81)	27 (81)	28 (82)	29 (84)	30 (86)	29 (84)	30 (86)	30 (86)	30 (86)	29 (84)	29 (84)	28 (82)	29 (84)
Mean daily minimum °C (°F)	23 (73)	23 (73)	23 (73)	24 (75)	24 (75)	25 (77)	24 (75)	24 (75)	24 (75)	24 (75)	24 (75)	23 (73)	24 (75)
Average precipitation mm (inches)	161 (6.3)	132 (5.2)	112 (4.4)	87 (3.4)	136 (5.4)	169 (6.7)	146 (5.7)	148 (5.8)	132 (5.2)	156 (6.1)	176 (6.9)	170 (6.7)	1,725 (67.8)
Average rainy days	20.0	16.2	18.3	17.5	24.0	26.7	27.5	27.5	26.5	26.4	23.8	21.0	275.4
Source: Meteoblue

== Demographics ==
Population census of Burgos
Year	Pop.	±% p.a.
1970	1,958	—
1975	2,584	+5.72%
1980	2,798	+1.60%
1990	2,617	−0.67%
1995	2,785	+1.17%
2000	3,043	+1.92%
2007	3,851	+3.30%
2010	4,058	+1.92%
2015	4,034	−0.11%
2020	4,185	+0.78%
2024	4,399	+1.20%
Source: Philippine Statistics Authority

== Economy ==
Poverty incidence of Burgos (%)

Source: Philippine Statistics Authority
