= San Isidro, Surigao del Norte =

Municipality in Surigao del Norte, Philippines

San Isidro
- Municipality
- Municipality of San Isidro
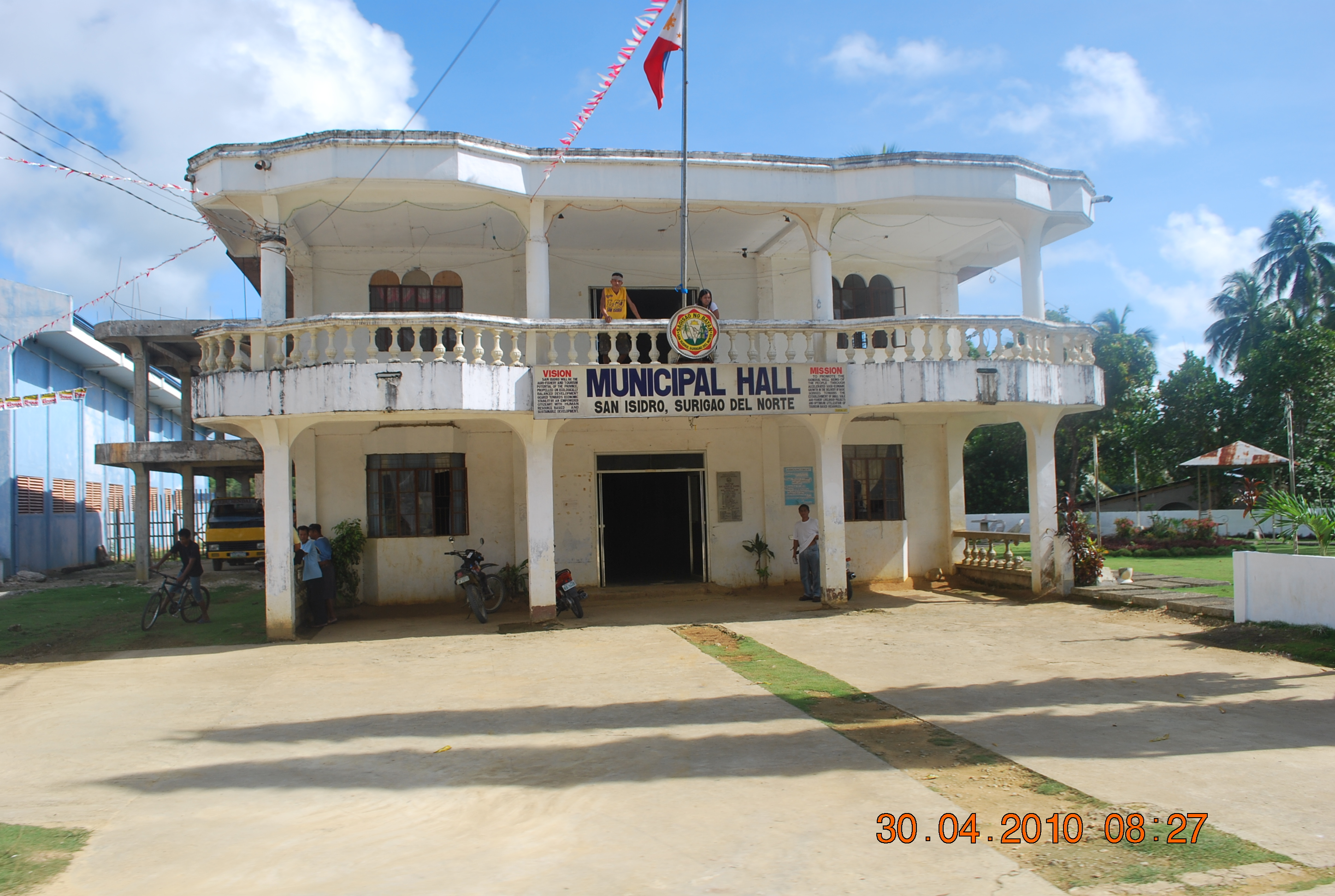
- Municipal Hall

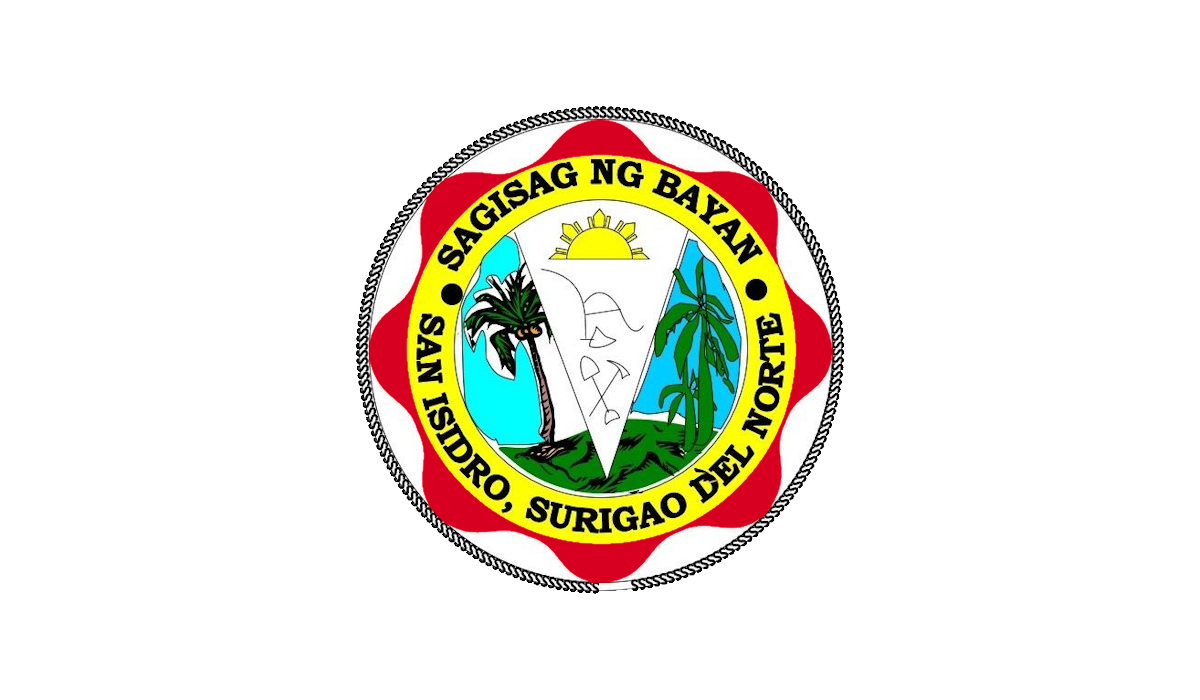
- Flag

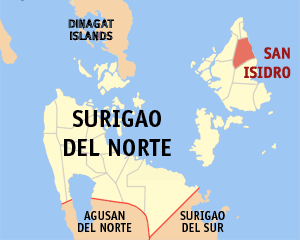
- Map of Surigao del Norte with San Isidro highlighted
- Interactive map of San Isidro
- Location within the Philippines
- Coordinates: 9°56′13″N 126°05′19″E
- Country: Philippines
- Region: Caraga
- Province: Surigao del Norte
- District: 1st district
- Founded: October 9, 1959
- Barangays: 12 (see Barangays)

Government
  - Type: Sangguniang Bayan
  - Mayor: Lamberto E. Domiños Jr.
  - Vice Mayor: Rudy D. Malaza
  - Representative: Francisco Jose F. Matugas II
  - Electorate: 8,276 voters (2025)

Area
  - Total: 42.03 km^{2} (16.23 sq mi)
- Elevation: 20 m (66 ft)
- Highest elevation: 232 m (761 ft)
- Lowest elevation: 0 m (0 ft)

Population (2024 census)
  - Total: 8,813
  - Density: 209.7/km^{2} (543.1/sq mi)
  - Households: 1,927

Economy
  - Income class: 5th municipal income class
  - Poverty incidence: 17.47% (2023)
  - Revenue: ₱ 91.38 million (2024)
  - Assets: ₱ 234.9 million (2024)
  - Expenditure: ₱ 84.42 million (2024)
  - Liabilities: ₱ 55.91 million (2024)

Service provider
  - Electricity: Siargao Electric Cooperative (SIARELCO)
- Time zone: UTC+8 (PST)
- ZIP code: 8421
- PSGC: 1606720000
- IDD : area code: +63 (0)86
- Native languages: Surigaonon; Agusan; Cebuano; Tagalog

San Isidro, officially the Municipality of San Isidro (Surigaonon: Lungsod nan San Isidro; Tagalog: Bayan ng San Isidro), is a municipality in the province of Surigao del Norte, Philippines. According to the 2024 census, it has a population of 8,813 people.

== History ==
Through Executive Order No. 359, issued by President Carlos P. Garcia on October 9, 1959, eight "barrios and sitios" of Numancia (later renamed Del Carmen), Surigao, were organized into the municipality of San Isidro.

== Geography ==
=== Barangays ===
San Isidro is politically subdivided into 12 barangays. Each barangay consists of puroks while some have sitios.

- Buhing Calipay
- Del Carmen (Poblacion)
- Del Pilar
- Macapagal
- Pacifico
- Pelaez
- Roxas
- San Miguel
- Santa Paz
- Santo Niño
- Tambacan
- Tigasao

=== Climate ===
Climate data for San Isidro, Surigao del Sur
Month	Jan	Feb	Mar	Apr	May	Jun	Jul	Aug	Sep	Oct	Nov	Dec	Year
Mean daily maximum °C (°F)	27 (81)	27 (81)	28 (82)	29 (84)	30 (86)	29 (84)	30 (86)	30 (86)	30 (86)	29 (84)	29 (84)	28 (82)	29 (84)
Mean daily minimum °C (°F)	23 (73)	23 (73)	23 (73)	24 (75)	24 (75)	24 (75)	24 (75)	24 (75)	24 (75)	24 (75)	24 (75)	24 (75)	24 (75)
Average precipitation mm (inches)	161 (6.3)	132 (5.2)	112 (4.4)	87 (3.4)	136 (5.4)	169 (6.7)	146 (5.7)	148 (5.8)	132 (5.2)	156 (6.1)	176 (6.9)	170 (6.7)	1,725 (67.8)
Average rainy days	20.0	16.2	18.3	17.5	24.0	26.7	27.5	27.5	26.5	26.4	23.8	21.1	275.5
Source: Meteoblue

== Demographics ==
Population census of San Isidro
Year	Pop.	±% p.a.
1960	2,630	—
1970	3,829	+3.82%
1975	5,609	+7.96%
1980	7,513	+6.02%
1990	5,245	−3.53%
1995	5,791	+1.87%
2000	6,058	+0.97%
2007	6,229	+0.38%
2010	6,973	+4.19%
2015	7,325	+0.94%
2020	8,519	+3.23%
2024	8,813	+0.82%
Source: Philippine Statistics Authority

== Economy ==
Poverty incidence of San Isidro (%)

Source: Philippine Statistics Authority
