= Padajon Surigao =

Political party in the Philippines

- Leader: Francisco Matugas
- Founded: 2007
- National affiliation: PFP (2026–present); Lakas–CMD (2009–2010; 2024–2026); PDP–Laban (2018–2024); Liberal (2010–2018)

The Padajon Surigao (PS) is a Surigao del Norte regional political party in the Philippines, closely affiliated with the Kabalikat ng Malayang Pilipino (Kampi) and later, Lakas–CMD.

There are no results available of the last elections for the House of Representatives, but according to the website of the House, the party holds two out of 235 seats (state of the parties, June 2007).

The party, in alliance with Kampi and Lakas, won most seats in the 2010 elections.
