= Dapa, Surigao del Norte =

Municipality in Surigao del Norte, Philippines

Dapa
- Municipality
- Municipality of Dapa
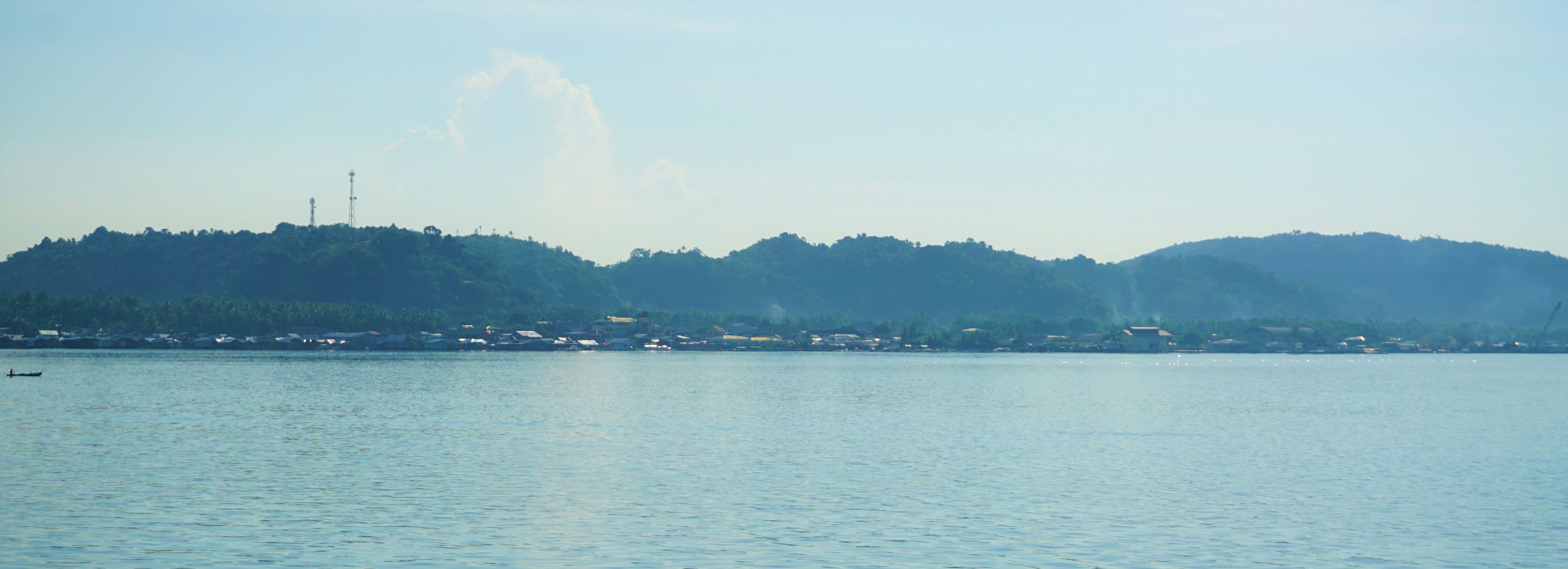
- Dapa from the Philippine Sea

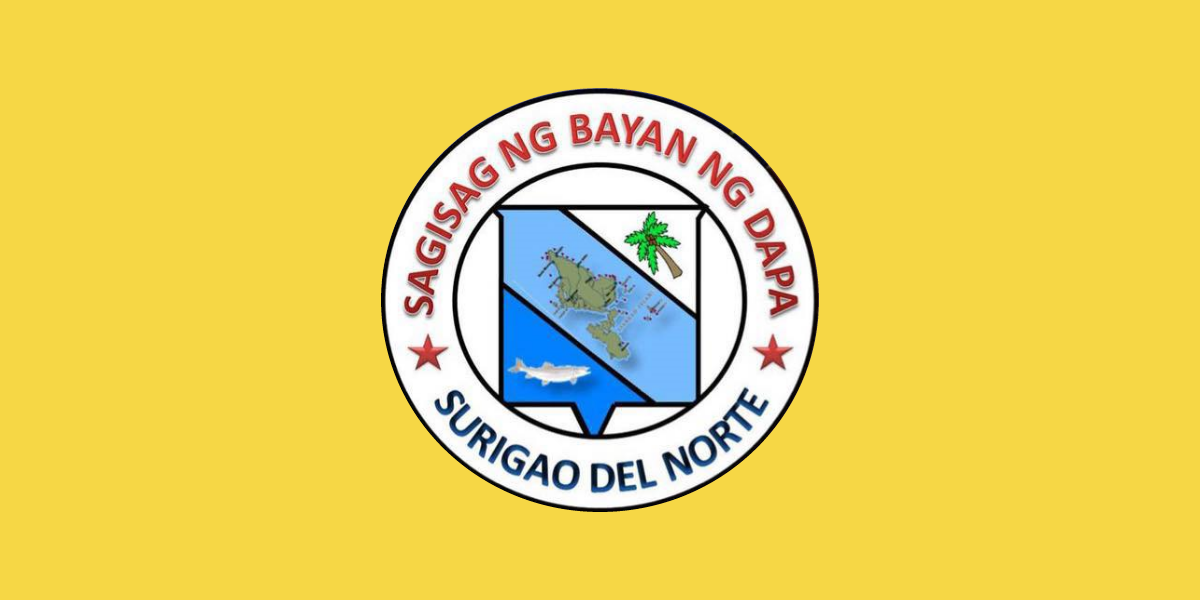
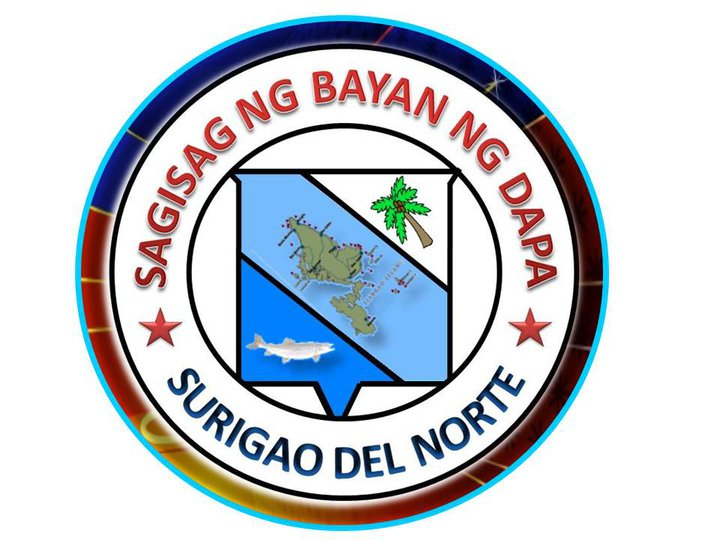
- Flag Seal

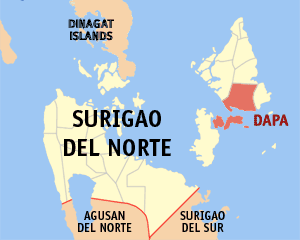
- Map of Surigao del Norte with Dapa highlighted
- Interactive map of Dapa
- Location within the Philippines
- Coordinates: 9°45′28″N 126°03′10″E
- Country: Philippines
- Region: Caraga
- Province: Surigao del Norte
- District: 1st district
- Barangays: 29 (see Barangays)

Government
  - Type: Sangguniang Bayan
  - Mayor: Elizabeth T. Matugas (LAKAS)
  - Vice Mayor: Gerry M. Abejo (LAKAS)
  - Representative: Francisco T. Matugas
  - Municipal Council: Members: Mackenley A. Tesiorna (LAKAS); Eric B. Almaden (LAKAS); Herlend T. Navarro (LAKAS); Marlon M. Coro (LAKAS); Carlito C. Dones (LAKAS); Chivas G. Dulguime (LAKAS); Myrna P. Catulay (LAKAS); Marian T. Solloso (NP)
  - Electorate: 24,658 voters (2025)

Area
  - Total: 91.90 km^{2} (35.48 sq mi)
- Elevation: 22 m (72 ft)
- Highest elevation: 278 m (912 ft)
- Lowest elevation: 0 m (0 ft)

Population (2024 census)
  - Total: 31,392
  - Density: 341.6/km^{2} (884.7/sq mi)
  - Households: 6,591

Economy
  - Income class: 2nd municipal income class
  - Poverty incidence: 13.62% (2023)
  - Revenue: ₱ 266.4 million (2024)
  - Assets: ₱ 958.1 million (2024)
  - Expenditure: ₱ 179.2 million (2024)
  - Liabilities: ₱ 481.6 million (2024)

Service provider
  - Electricity: Siargao Electric Cooperative (SIARELCO)
- Time zone: UTC+8 (PST)
- ZIP code: 8417
- PSGC: 1606707000
- IDD : area code: +63 (0)86
- Native languages: Surigaonon; Agusan; Cebuano; Tagalog

Dapa, officially the Municipality of Dapa (Surigaonon: Lungsod nan Dapa; Tagalog: Bayan ng Dapa), is a municipality in the province of Surigao del Norte, Philippines. According to the 2024 census, it has a population of 31,392 people.

== Etymology ==
The town's name "Dapa" is a corrupted form of the vernacular term "Hapa." It was adopted by the local inhabitants as the permanent name of their settlement originally known as Taghaligue. This renaming served as a lasting reminder of the Moro raids that occurred during the early years of the last century under the Spanish colonization of the Philippines.

== Geography ==
Most of the municipality is situated on Siargao Island, but Middle Bucas Grande and East Bucas Grande Islands are also within its jurisdiction. It is known as the "Growth Center of the beautiful islands of Siargao".

=== Barangays ===
Dapa is politically subdivided into 29 barangays. Each barangay consists of puroks while some have sitios.

- Bagakay
- Barangay 1 (Poblacion)
- Barangay 10 (Poblacion)
- Barangay 11 (Poblacion)
- Barangay 12 (Poblacion)
- Barangay 13 (Poblacion)
- Barangay 2 (Poblacion)
- Barangay 3 (Poblacion)
- Barangay 4 (Poblacion)
- Barangay 5 (Poblacion)
- Barangay 6 (Poblacion)
- Barangay 7 (Poblacion)
- Barangay 8 (Poblacion)
- Barangay 9 (Poblacion)
- Buenavista
- Cabawa
- Cambas-ac
- Consolacion
- Corregidor
- Dagohoy
- Don Paulino
- Jubang
- Montserrat
- Osmeña
- San Carlos
- San Miguel
- Santa Fe
- Santa Filomena
- Union

Barangays 1 through 13 constitute Dapa's poblacion. Barangay Don Paulino is synonymous with the village of Giwan. Barangay Union is synonymous with the village of Union.

=== Climate ===
Climate data for Dapa, Surigao del Norte
Month	Jan	Feb	Mar	Apr	May	Jun	Jul	Aug	Sep	Oct	Nov	Dec	Year
Mean daily maximum °C (°F)	27 (81)	27 (81)	28 (82)	29 (84)	30 (86)	29 (84)	30 (86)	30 (86)	30 (86)	29 (84)	29 (84)	28 (82)	29 (84)
Mean daily minimum °C (°F)	23 (73)	23 (73)	23 (73)	24 (75)	24 (75)	24 (75)	24 (75)	24 (75)	24 (75)	24 (75)	24 (75)	24 (75)	24 (75)
Average precipitation mm (inches)	161 (6.3)	132 (5.2)	112 (4.4)	87 (3.4)	136 (5.4)	169 (6.7)	146 (5.7)	148 (5.8)	132 (5.2)	156 (6.1)	176 (6.9)	170 (6.7)	1,725 (67.8)
Average rainy days	20.0	16.2	18.3	17.5	24.0	26.7	27.5	27.5	26.5	26.4	23.8	21.0	275.4
Source: Meteoblue (modeled/calculated data, not measured locally)

== Demographics ==
Population census of Dapa
Year	Pop.	±% p.a.
1903	3,590	—
1918	15,769	+10.37%
1939	11,313	−1.57%
1948	14,492	+2.79%
1960	13,878	−0.36%
1970	13,309	−0.42%
1975	14,628	+1.91%
1980	16,481	+2.41%
1990	17,396	+0.54%
1995	16,435	−1.06%
2000	19,508	+3.74%
2007	22,184	+1.79%
2010	23,492	+2.11%
2015	23,787	+0.24%
2020	29,006	+4.26%
2024	31,392	+1.92%
Source: Philippine Statistics Authority

Surigaonon is the common local language, while Cebuano, Filipino, and English are also spoken.

== Sports ==
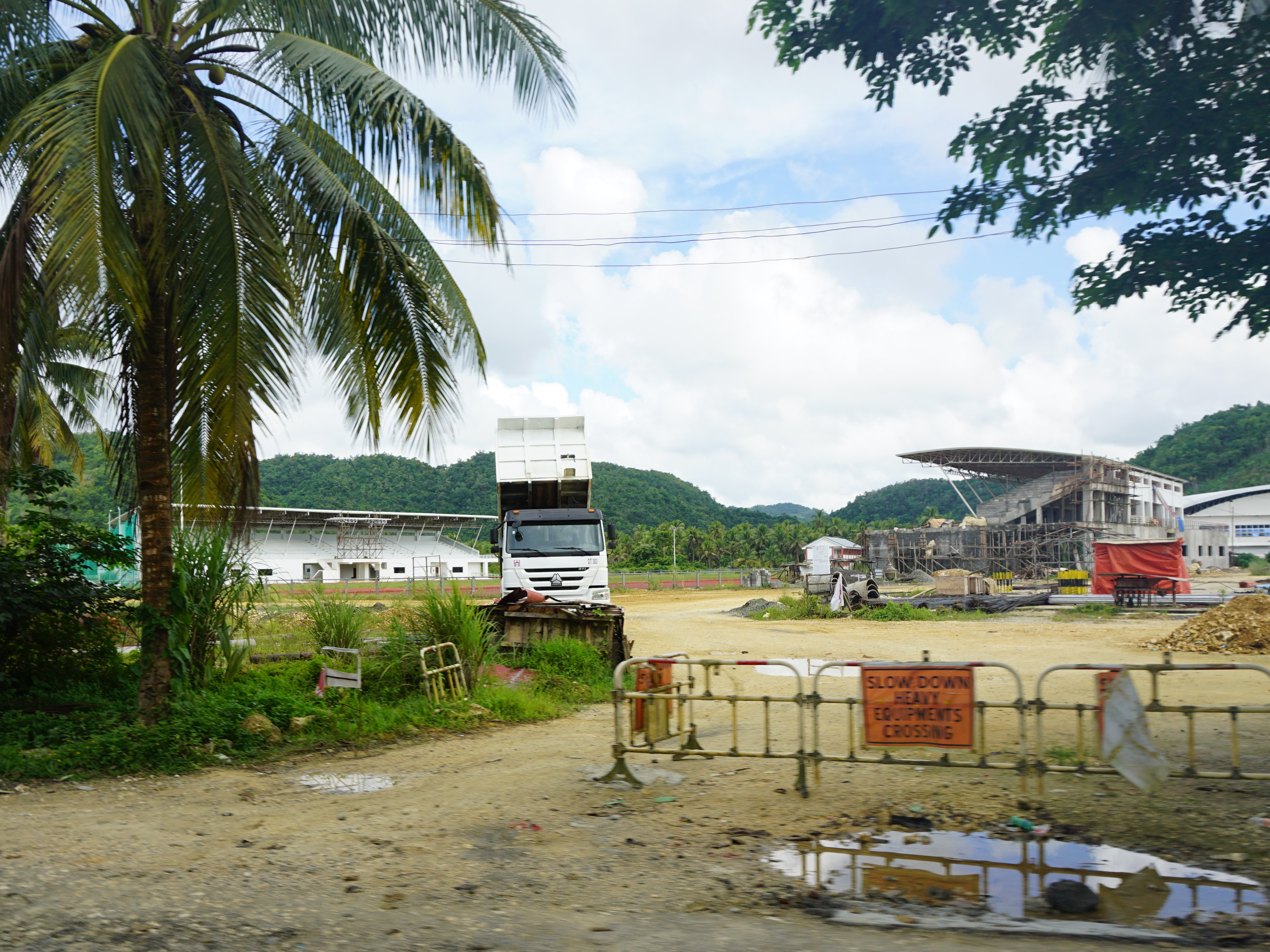
Siargao Sports Complex under construction

The Siargao Island Sports Complex is a sports complex with a cost of PP300 million, it can accommodate 5,000 persons, expected to be finished by 2017 or early 2018, but opened and inaugurated in January 2020. Once completed, Siargao Sports Complex will host the regional games, which will mark its first hosting rights in the history of Caraga Region.

== Infrastructure ==
=== Telecommunication ===
The Philippine Long Distance Telephone Company provides fixed line services. Wireless mobile communications services are provided by Smart Communications and Globe Telecommunications.

== Education ==
Dapa is considered as the center of education in the island. The newly established Siargao National Science High School is the home of scholar students who are gifted in the field of science and mathematics. It may as well develop a strong science culture among high schools in the island.

Colleges:

- Siargao Island Institute of Technology
- Siargao National College of Science and Technology

High schools:

- Dapa National High School
- Consolacion National High School
- Union National High School
- Dagohoy National High School
- Siargao National Science High School
- San Nicolas School

== Media ==
- DXSS, Radyo Kidlat.
