= Del Carmen, Surigao del Norte =

Municipality in Surigao del Norte, Philippines

Del Carmen Numancia
- Municipality
- Municipality of Del Carmen
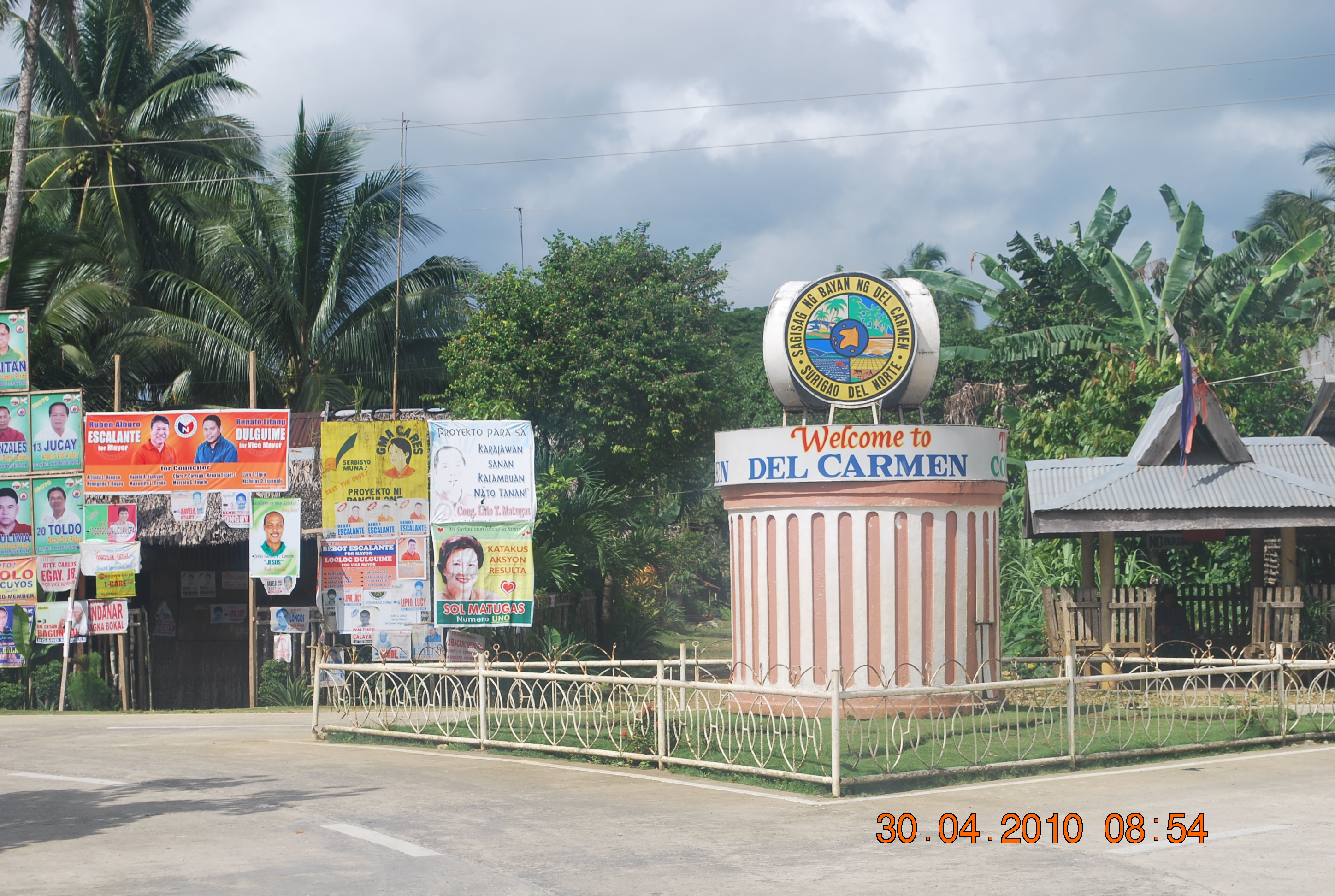
- Del Carmen welcome sign

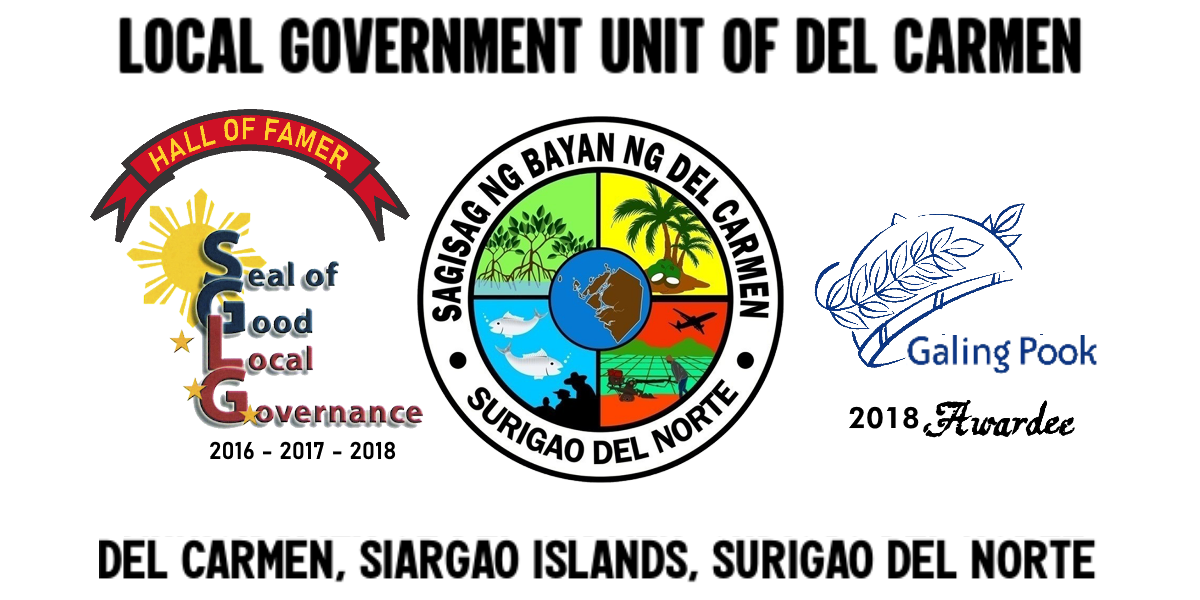
- Flag

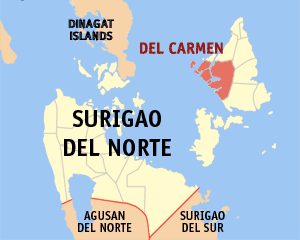
- Map of Surigao del Norte with Del Carmen highlighted
- Interactive map of Del Carmen
- Location within the Philippines
- Coordinates: 9°52′08″N 125°58′12″E
- Country: Philippines
- Region: Caraga
- Province: Surigao del Norte
- District: 1st district
- Barangays: 20 (see Barangays)

Government
  - Type: Sangguniang Bayan
  - Mayor: Alfredo M. Coro II (LAKAS)
  - Vice Mayor: Renato L. Dulguime (LAKAS)
  - Representative: Francisco Jose F. Matugas II
  - Municipal Council: Members: Walthon D. Calayag (LAKAS); Pablo C. Alburo Jr. (LAKAS); Geny Lou C. Petallo (LAKAS); Jesus G. Comon (IND); Bobie C. Paitan (LAKAS); Arlinda L. Donoso LAKAS); Shyra Mae S. Jucay ((LAKAS); Wellman D. Coro (LAKAS)
  - Electorate: 13,341 voters (2025)

Area
  - Total: 151.68 km^{2} (58.56 sq mi)
- Elevation: 13 m (43 ft)
- Highest elevation: 278 m (912 ft)
- Lowest elevation: 0 m (0 ft)

Population (2024 census)
  - Total: 20,786
  - Density: 137.04/km^{2} (354.93/sq mi)
  - Households: 4,723

Economy
  - Income class: 3rd municipal income class
  - Poverty incidence: 15.81% (2023)
  - Revenue: ₱ 164.6 million (2024)
  - Assets: ₱ 533.7 million (2024)
  - Expenditure: ₱ 143.4 million (2024)
  - Liabilities: ₱ 223.7 million (2024)

Service provider
  - Electricity: Siargao Electric Cooperative (SIARELCO)
- Time zone: UTC+8 (PST)
- ZIP code: 8418
- PSGC: 1606708000
- IDD : area code: +63 (0)86
- Native languages: Surigaonon; Agusan; Cebuano; Tagalog
- Website: www.visitdelcarmen.com

Del Carmen, officially the Municipality of Del Carmen (Surigaonon: Lungsod nan Del Carmen; Tagalog: Bayan ng Del Carmen), is a municipality in the province of Surigao del Norte, Philippines. According to the 2024 census, it has a population of 20,786 people. The municipality was formerly called Numancia until 1966 when it was changed to its present name, after its patroness, the Virgin of Carmel. It is located on Siargao Island and home to Sayak Airport, the island's main airport.

== Geography ==
=== Barangays ===
Del Carmen is politically subdivided into 20 barangays. Each barangay consists of puroks while some have sitios.

- Antipolo
- Alburo (Bagakay)
- Bitoon
- Cabugao
- Cancohoy
- Caub
- Del Carmen (Poblacion)
- Domoyog
- Esperanza
- Halian
- Jamoyaon
- Katipunan
- Lobogon
- Mabuhay
- Mahayahay
- Quezon
- San Fernando
- San Jose (Poblacion)
- Sayak
- Tuboran

=== Climate ===
Climate data for Del Carmen, Surigao del Norte
Month	Jan	Feb	Mar	Apr	May	Jun	Jul	Aug	Sep	Oct	Nov	Dec	Year
Mean daily maximum °C (°F)	27 (81)	28 (82)	28 (82)	30 (86)	30 (86)	30 (86)	29 (84)	30 (86)	30 (86)	29 (84)	29 (84)	28 (82)	29 (84)
Mean daily minimum °C (°F)	23 (73)	23 (73)	23 (73)	23 (73)	25 (77)	25 (77)	25 (77)	25 (77)	25 (77)	25 (77)	24 (75)	24 (75)	24 (75)
Average precipitation mm (inches)	210 (8.3)	161 (6.3)	123 (4.8)	85 (3.3)	148 (5.8)	186 (7.3)	164 (6.5)	157 (6.2)	141 (5.6)	190 (7.5)	223 (8.8)	200 (7.9)	1,988 (78.3)
Average rainy days	21.0	16.8	18.5	18.2	24.9	27.7	28.4	27.0	26.1	27.6	24.6	22.0	282.8
Source: Meteoblue (modeled/calculated data, not measured locally)

== Demographics ==
Population census of Del Carmen
Year	Pop.	±% p.a.
1903	3,435	—
1939	11,051	+3.30%
1948	16,746	+4.73%
1960	10,830	−3.57%
1970	11,186	+0.32%
1975	10,597	−1.08%
1980	11,768	+2.12%
1990	11,786	+0.02%
1995	12,316	+0.83%
2000	13,558	+2.08%
2007	14,892	+1.30%
2010	17,136	+5.24%
2015	18,392	+1.36%
2020	20,127	+1.92%
2024	20,786	+0.78%
Source: Philippine Statistics Authority

== Economy ==
Poverty incidence of Del Carmen (%)

Source: Philippine Statistics Authority

== Education ==
- Surigao State College of Technology - Del Carmen Campus

== See also ==
- List of renamed cities and municipalities in the Philippines
