= Legislative districts of Surigao del Sur =

The legislative districts of Surigao del Sur are the representations of the province of Surigao del Sur in the various national legislatures of the Philippines. The province is currently represented in the lower house of the Congress of the Philippines through its first and second congressional districts.

== History ==
Prior to gaining separate representation, areas now under the jurisdiction of Surigao del Sur were represented under the former province of Surigao (1907–1961).

The enactment of Republic Act No. 2786 on June 19, 1960 split the old Surigao province into Surigao del Norte and Surigao del Sur, and provided the new provinces separate representations in Congress. The new province of Surigao del Sur first elected its own representative in the 1961 elections.

Surigao del Sur was represented in the Interim Batasang Pambansa as part of Region XI from 1978 to 1984, and returned one representative, elected at large, to the Regular Batasang Pambansa in 1984. The province was reapportioned into two congressional districts under the new Constitution which was proclaimed on February 11, 1987, and elected members to the restored House of Representatives starting that same year.

== 1st District ==
- City: Tandag (became city 2007)
- Municipalities: Bayabas, Cagwait, Cantilan, Carmen, Carrascal, Cortes, Lanuza, Lianga, Madrid, Marihatag, San Agustin, San Miguel, Tago
- Population (2020): 369,785

| Period | Representative |
|---|---|
| 8th Congress; 1987–1992 | Mario S. Ty |
| 9th Congress; 1992–1995 | Mario S. Ty |
| 10th Congress; 1995–1998 | Mario S. Ty |
| 11th Congress; 1998–2001 | Prospero A. Pichay, Jr. |
| 12th Congress; 2001–2004 | Prospero A. Pichay, Jr. |
| 13th Congress; 2004–2007 | Prospero A. Pichay, Jr. |
| 14th Congress; 2007–2010 | Philip A. Pichay |
| 15th Congress; 2010–2013 | Philip A. Pichay |
| 16th Congress; 2013–2016 | Philip A. Pichay (Note: Unseated by the Supreme Court on January 26, 2016 after losing electoral protest lodged by Mary Elizabeth Ty-Delgado.) |
| 16th Congress; 2013–2016 | Mary Elizabeth Ty-Delgado (Note: Replaced Philip Pichay after being declared rightful representative by the Supreme Court on January 26, 2016; served for the remainder of the 16th Congress.) |
| 17th Congress; 2016–2019 | Prospero A. Pichay, Jr. |
| 18th Congress; 2019–2022 | Prospero A. Pichay, Jr. |
| 19th Congress; 2022–2025 | Romeo S. Momo Sr. |
| 20th Congress; 2025–2028 | Romeo S. Momo Sr. |

== 2nd District ==
- City: Bislig (became city 2000)
- Municipalities: Barobo, Hinatuan, Lingig, Tagbina
- Population (2020): 272,470

| Period | Representative |
|---|---|
| 8th Congress; 1987–1992 | Ernesto T. Estrella |
| 9th Congress; 1992–1995 | Ernesto T. Estrella |
| 10th Congress; 1995–1998 | Jesnar R. Falcon |
| 11th Congress; 1998–2001 | Jesnar R. Falcon |
| 12th Congress; 2001–2004 | Jesnar R. Falcon |
| 13th Congress; 2004–2007 | Peter Paul Jed C. Falcon |
| 14th Congress; 2007–2010 | Florencio C. Garay |
| 15th Congress; 2010–2013 | Florencio C. Garay |
| 16th Congress; 2013–2016 | Florencio C. Garay |
| 17th Congress; 2016–2019 | Johnny T. Pimentel |
| 18th Congress; 2019–2022 | Johnny T. Pimentel |
| 19th Congress; 2022–2025 | Johnny T. Pimentel |
| 20th Congress; 2025–2028 | Alexander T. Pimentel |

== Lone District (defunct) ==
| Period | Representative |
|---|---|
| 5th Congress; 1961–1965 | Vicente L. Pimentel, Sr. |
| 6th Congress; 1965–1969 | Gregorio P. Murillo, Sr. |
| 7th Congress; 1969–1972 | Jose G. Puyat, Jr. |

== At-Large (defunct) ==
| Period | Representative |
|---|---|
| Regular Batasang Pambansa; 1984–1986 | Higino C. Llaguno, Jr. |

== See also ==
- Legislative district of Surigao
