= Kamayo language =

Austronesian language spoken in Philippines

Kamayo
- Native to: Philippines
- Region: Surigao del Sur and Davao Oriental
- Ethnicity: Kamayo people Mandayas
- Native speakers: (360,000 cited 2000 census)
- Language family: Austronesian: Malayo-Polynesian; Philippine; Central Philippine; Mansakan; North Mansakan; Kamayo
- Dialects: Kamayo North; Kamayo South

Language codes
- ISO 639-3: kyk
- Glottolog: kama1363

Kamayo (Kinamayo or alternatively spelled Camayo), also called Kadi, Kinadi, or Mandaya, is a minor Austronesian language of the central eastern coast of Mindanao in the Philippines.

== Distribution ==
Spoken in some areas of Surigao del Sur (the city of Bislig and the municipalities of Barobo, Hinatuan, Lingig, Tagbina, Lianga, San Agustin & Marihatag) and Davao Oriental, Kamayo varies from one municipality to another. Lingiganons are quite different from other municipalities in the way they speak the Kamayo language. Ethnologue also reports that Kamayo is spoken in the Agusan del Sur Province border areas, and in Davao Oriental Province between Lingig and Boston.

=== Dialects ===
Kamayo is a language widely used by the Mandayas in the Davao Oriental areas. It is closely related to Tandaganon and Surigaonon. Dialect variations are caused by mixed dialect communications such as the Cebuano language in barangays Mangagoy and Pob. Bislig. The towns of Barobo, Hinatuan, and Lingig has a distinct version spoken. A suffix is usually added to most adjectives in the superlative form; for example, the word gamay in Cebuano ('small') is gamayay while the word dako ('big') is spoken as dako-ay in Bislig.

Kamayo dialects can be classified as North Kamayo and South Kamayo.

== Phonology ==
Vowels
	Front	Central	Back
Close	i		u uː
Near-close	ɪ		ʊ
Open		a aː	(ɔ)

/ɔ/ is only heard in a diphthong, /ɔi/.

Consonants
		Labial	Alveolar	Palatal	Velar	Glottal
Nasal		m	n		ŋ	
Plosive	voiceless	p	t		k	
Plosive	voiced	b	d		ɡ	
Fricative			s			h
Rhotic			r			
Approximant		w	l	j		

== Vocabulary ==
Common phrases

Kamayo	Tagalog	English
Adi / Ngani	Dito	Here
Ngadto	Doon	There
Ampan / Wara	Wala	Nothing
Aron	Meron	Have
Basi / Basin	Baka	Maybe
Butang	Lagay	Put
Hain	Saan	Where
Idtu	Ayon	That
Inday	Ewan	I don't know
Ini / Ngini	Ito	This
Itun	Ayan	That is
Kamang	Kuha	Take
Kinu	Kailan	When
Madayaw	Mabuti	Good
Maraat	Pangit	Ugly
Nanga sa	Bakit	Why
Unaan / Naan	Ano	What
Pila	Magkano	How much
Sinu / Sin-u	Sino	Who
Tagi	Bigay	Give
Unuhon	Paano	How
Wara	Wala	None
Isu	Bata	Child
hinuod	Matanda	Old person
Irong	Ilong	Nose
Huo	Oo	Yes
Diri	Hindi	No
Bayho	Mukha	Face
Alima	Kamay	Hand
Siki	Paa	Foot
Paa	Hita	Thigh
Pasu-ay	Mainit	Hot

== See also ==
- Languages of the Philippines
