= Surigao del Sur's 2nd congressional district =

Legislative district of the Philippines

- Constituency for the House of Representatives of the Philippines
- Location of Surigao del Sur within the Philippines
- Province: Surigao del Sur
- Region: Caraga
- Population: 272,470 (2020)
- Electorate: 188,264 (2022)
- Major settlements: 5 LGUs: Cities; Bislig; Municipalities; Barobo; Hinatuan; Lingig; Tagbina
- Area: 1,522.06 km^{2} (587.67 sq mi)

Current constituency
- Created: 1987
- Representative: Alexander Pimentel
- Political party: PFP
- Congressional bloc: Majority

Surigao del Sur's 2nd congressional district is one of the two congressional districts of the Philippines in the province of Surigao del Sur. It has been represented in the House of Representatives since 1987. The district consists of the city of Bislig and the southern municipalities of Barobo, Hinatuan, Lingig and Tagbina. It is currently represented in the 20th Congress by Alexander Pimentel of the Partido Federal ng Pilipinas (PFP).

== Representation history ==
#	Image	Member	Term of office		Congress	Party	Electoral history	Constituent LGUs
#	Image	Member	Start	End	Congress	Party	Electoral history	Constituent LGUs
=== Surigao del Sur's 2nd district for the House of Representatives of the Philippines ===
District created February 2, 1987 from Surigao del Sur's at-large district.
1		Ernesto T. Estrella	June 30, 1987	June 30, 1995	8th	LDP	Elected in 1987.	1987–present Barobo, Bislig, Hinatuan, Lingig, Tagbina
1		Ernesto T. Estrella	June 30, 1987	June 30, 1995	9th	Lakas	Re-elected in 1992.	1987–present Barobo, Bislig, Hinatuan, Lingig, Tagbina
2		Jesnar R. Falcon	June 30, 1995	June 30, 2004	10th	Independent	Elected in 1995.	1987–present Barobo, Bislig, Hinatuan, Lingig, Tagbina
2		Jesnar R. Falcon	June 30, 1995	June 30, 2004	11th	LAMMP	Re-elected in 1998.	1987–present Barobo, Bislig, Hinatuan, Lingig, Tagbina
2		Jesnar R. Falcon	June 30, 1995	June 30, 2004	12th	Lakas	Re-elected in 2001.	1987–present Barobo, Bislig, Hinatuan, Lingig, Tagbina
3		Peter Paul Jed C. Falcon	June 30, 2004	June 30, 2007	13th	KAMPI	Elected in 2004.	1987–present Barobo, Bislig, Hinatuan, Lingig, Tagbina
4		Florencio C. Garay	June 30, 2007	June 30, 2016	14th	Nacionalista	Elected in 2007.	1987–present Barobo, Bislig, Hinatuan, Lingig, Tagbina
4		Florencio C. Garay	June 30, 2007	June 30, 2016	15th	Liberal	Re-elected in 2010.	1987–present Barobo, Bislig, Hinatuan, Lingig, Tagbina
4		Florencio C. Garay	June 30, 2007	June 30, 2016	16th	Liberal	Re-elected in 2013.	1987–present Barobo, Bislig, Hinatuan, Lingig, Tagbina
5		Johnny T. Pimentel	June 30, 2016	June 30, 2025	17th	Liberal	Elected in 2016.	1987–present Barobo, Bislig, Hinatuan, Lingig, Tagbina
5		Johnny T. Pimentel	June 30, 2016	June 30, 2025	18th	PDP–Laban	Re-elected in 2019.	1987–present Barobo, Bislig, Hinatuan, Lingig, Tagbina
5		Johnny T. Pimentel	June 30, 2016	June 30, 2025	19th	NUP	Re-elected in 2022.	1987–present Barobo, Bislig, Hinatuan, Lingig, Tagbina
6		Alexander Pimentel	June 30, 2025	Incumbent	20th	PFP	Elected in 2025.	1987–present Barobo, Bislig, Hinatuan, Lingig, Tagbina

== See also ==
- Legislative districts of Surigao del Sur
