= Urbiztondo (surname) =

Urbiztondo is a surname. Notable people with the surname include:

- Felixberto Urbiztondo (1941–2018), Filipino politician
- Josh Urbiztondo (born 1983), Filipino basketball player
- Juan Antonio de Urbiztondo, Marquis of La Solana (1803–1857), Spanish military officer
