= Panaraga Beach =

Beach and tourist spot in Surigao del Sur, Philippines

Coordinates: 8°32′55″N 126°14′15″E

Panaraga Beach is a tourist area in Barobo, Surigao del Sur, Philippines.

Panaraga beach has a beautiful view with a stretch of blue sea and natural white sand.currently being carried out various supporting the needs of tourists in order to provide comfort.

Panaraga Beach has a history with people from Ponorogo, East Java. Ponorogo ship anchored on the beach with a large ship so that the beach is called Panaraga by the surrounding community, which then makes good relations with residents around the coast, Ponorogo people give farming lessons and self-defense to residents around the coast.

Ponorogo in Javanese is written in Panaraga.
