= Felixberto Urbiztondo =

Filipino politician (1941–2018)

Felixberto S. Urbiztondo
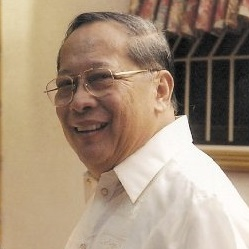
- Picture of Felixberto urbiztondo Urbiztondo in the 2010s

Mayor of Barobo
- In office June 30, 2010 – March 31, 2018
- Preceded by: Arturo Ronquillo
- Succeeded by: Joey S. Pama (interim)

Personal details
- Born: September 24, 1941 Tambis, Barobo Surigao del Sur
- Died: March 31, 2018 (aged 76) Davao City, Philippines
- Party: Liberal
- Spouse: Josefina Dasig
- Children: 3
- Education: University of the East
- Occupation: Mayor, Attorney at Law
- Profession: Politician, Attorney

Felixberto "Berting" Salang Urbiztondo (September 24, 1941 – March 31, 2018) was a Filipino lawyer and politician. He served as the mayor of Barobo, Surigao del Sur for three terms. Passing away while still in office on March 31, 2018, he was a member of the Liberal Party. He was the son of the first mayor of Barobo, Felix P. Urbiztondo (served from 1961 to 1967). In the 2010 Philippine general election, Urbiztondo won convincingly against three other mayoral candidates (Allan Bernal, Matias Caybot and Mary Grace Sanchez). In 2013, Urbiztondo won re-election with a landslide victory over opponent Allan Bernal and repeated the same feat three years later to win a third consecutive term, this time versus Arturo Ronquillo; he won all 22 barangays and over 7,000 votes of 22,000 registered voters.

== Early life and career ==
Born in September 24, 1941 in the Barangay of Tambis, Barobo, Surigao del Sur, Urbiztondo was the youngest of three children, the only son of Felix P. Urbiztondo and Baldomera Salang. He went on to study at University of the East. He became a lawyer in 1974 and practiced law under his father-in-law Nicodemus Dasig's private law firm in Metro Manila until 1981.

== Personal life ==
He married Josefina Dasig on January 12, 1969. They have three children.

Preceded by Arturo Ronquillo	Mayor of Barobo, Surigao del Sur; 2010 - 2013 / 2013 - 2016 / 2016 - 2018 Elected 3 Terms	Succeeded by Interim - Vice Mayor Joey S. Pama
