= Lianga =

Municipality in Surigao del Sur, Philippines

- Municipality
- Municipality of Lianga
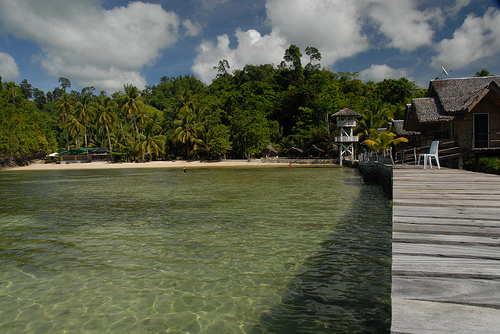
- Kansilad Beach Resort in Lianga

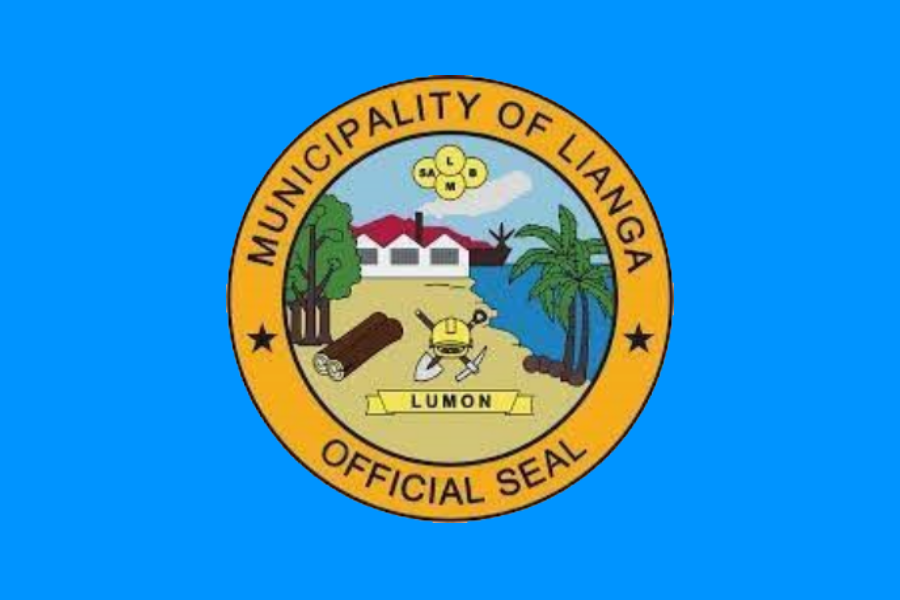
- Flag Seal
- Nicknames: Magkono Capital of Surigao; Seafood Capital of Surigao del Sur
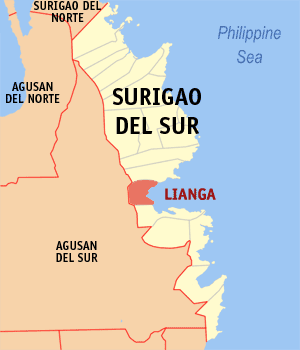
- Map of Surigao del Sur with Lianga highlighted
- Interactive map of Lianga
- Location within the Philippines
- Coordinates: 8°37′59″N 126°05′36″E
- Country: Philippines
- Region: Caraga
- Province: Surigao del Sur
- District: 1st district
- Founded: October 17, 1919
- Barangays: 13 (see Barangays)

Government
  - Type: Sangguniang Bayan
  - Mayor: Dr. Amado M. Layno, Jr.
  - Vice Mayor: Francis Ferdinand G. Layno
  - Representative: Romeo S. Momo Sr.
  - Electorate: 25,350 voters (2025)

Area
  - Total: 161.12 km^{2} (62.21 sq mi)
- Elevation: 86 m (282 ft)
- Highest elevation: 517 m (1,696 ft)
- Lowest elevation: 0 m (0 ft)

Population (2024 census)
  - Total: 34,213
  - Density: 212.34/km^{2} (549.97/sq mi)
  - Households: 7,788

Economy
  - Income class: 2nd municipal income class
  - Poverty incidence: 19.04% (2023)
  - Revenue: ₱ 182.1 million (2024)
  - Assets: ₱ 264.9 million (2024)
  - Expenditure: ₱ 92.47 million (2024)
  - Liabilities: ₱ 25.05 million (2024)

Service provider
  - Electricity: Surigao del Sur 2 Electric Cooperative (SURSECO 2)
- Time zone: UTC+8 (PST)
- ZIP code: 8307
- PSGC: 1606811000
- IDD : area code: +63 (0)86
- Native languages: Surigaonon; Agusan; Cebuano; Tagalog
- Website: www.lianga.gov.ph

Lianga, officially the Municipality of Lianga (Surigaonon: Lungsod nan Lianga; Tagalog: Bayan ng Lianga), is a municipality in the province of Surigao del Sur, Philippines. According to the 2024 census, Lianga has a population of 34,213 people.

== Etymology and legends ==
A couple of centuries ago, along the bay facing the bluish sea of the Pacific Ocean, was a place like those in fairy tales. The white beaches were traversed by two rivers, one in the south and the other in the north. A little distance from the shoreline, the landscape started to rise until it reached its peak in the west, which is one of the ranges of the enchanted Mount Diwata. The place was thickly forested, blanketed with big trees, varieties of wild flowers, aerial plants, and vines. On the ground, wild animals of different species roam around the area. White, colorful birds and other winged creatures flit from tree to tree. Nature's music, like the chirping of birds, the humming of bees, and other wood-land insects intermingling with the sound of roaring waves, could be heard from a distance. This truly translates to the feeling of being born free in nature. The place was breathtaking to behold. Indeed, it was paradise where nature remained undisturbed.

Then men settled along the cove near the river in the south. It was said that these early inhabitants were the Manobos, who were ruled by a chieftain (datu). Their clothes were made of woven abaca fiber and adorned with multi-colored beads. Land and water resources were abundant; hence, they loved to hunt in the forest, gather shells along the shores, and fish in the rivers. There was peace and harmony among the early inhabitants. They were happy and content. Later, however, as their tribes increased, their descendants thought of moving to surrounding areas, so there was rivalry as to who would own which pieces of land. Whenever disputes over land ownership and quarrels among themselves occurred, they were settled in a duel alongside the river in the north. Whoever won was proclaimed a "Daugan" or "Mananaog" by the chieftain (datu). The place became popular; hence, the river was named Pananag-an.

People going to the other side of the river have to wade across it slowly as the current was swift; it always took them such time to reach the other side of the river, and they often say to themselves, "Langan pagtabok" or "Malangan kita" (It delays to cross or we will be delayed). One day, as the old folks claimed, a foreigner passed by the place. After having crossed the river, he asked the people the name of the place. Thinking that the stranger was asking what they were doing, they answered, "Langan pagtabok". The foreigner heard "Langan" and thought it was the name of the place, then people started calling the whole settlement "Langan". Later, with the influence of the Spanish "Li" alphabet, Langan was pronounced "Liangan". As generations passed, the final "N" in Llangan was dropped, and the "Ll" sound was changed to "Li", hence saying that is how Lianga got its name.

== History ==
Lianga is one of the oldest towns of the province of Surigao del Sur by virtue of Executive Order No. 27 on October 17, 1919. The municipality of Lianga is centrally located in the province of Surigao del Sur. It is situated along the Lianga Bay facing the Pacific Ocean and cradled by its shorelines and the Diwata Mountains. Its latitude is 30 and longitude is within 12635 and is bounded on the north by the Municipality of San Agustin, on the south by the Municipality of Barobo, on the west by the province of Agusan del Sur and the east lies the Pacific Ocean. It is 90.0 kilometers to the south of Tandag City, the capital of the province, 237 kilometers from Davao City, 121 kilometers from Butuan and 16 kilometers from Prosperidad, the capital town of Agusan del Sur (via Lianga–Los Arcos Road).

In the history of Caraga Region, Lianga was part of the encomienda way back in 1655 under the command of Sergeant Martin Sanchez dela Cuesta. This encomienda covered Palaso (Cantilan). Tandag as its capital, Tago, Marihatag and Lianga. From 1904 to 1936, the head of the town was called President, per record obtained, the first elected president of Lianga was Cornelio Layno, whose two-year term covered the period from 1904 to 1906. The first elected mayor was Otilio Navarro, who served from 1937 to 1940. From then on, there were seven elected mayors of Lianga from 1941 up to the present. Within these periods, two became mayors by succession, another two by appointment.

Almost half a century ago, the territorial land area of Lianga was vast, considering the fact that the present municipalities of San Agustin, Marihatag and Barobo were once a part of Lianga. The births of these three municipalities were the results of political subdivisions authored by the political leaders of the undivided Surigao. San Agustin, formerly called Oteiza, was the first daughter municipality of Lianga created under Executive Order No. 445 in 1951, during the presidency of Elpidio Quirino. The governor of Surigao that time was Vicente L. Pimentel. Four years later, the Municipality of Marihatag was created under Republic Act No. 1261 on June 10, 1955. As the population of Lianga increased, it was not spared from further political subdivision. The electorate in the southern barrios of Lianga moved for the creation of another municipality, called the Municipality of Barobo, as the seat of the municipal government. The creation of the Municipality of Barobo was made through Executive Order no. 407 and 2786 on October 24, 1960. Of the three municipalities created from the municipality of Lianga, Marihatag has the largest land area. Among these four municipalities formerly referred to as the "BLOM" Area (for Barobo, Lianga, Oteiza, and Marihatag) Lianga, the mother municipality has the smallest land area with only 15,000 hectares.

Significant development in Lianga has been noted since 1960 with the creation of Surigao del Sur as a province (Republic Act 2786). It was more evident in the 1970s to 1980s when the coastal barangay of Diatagon [Jiatagon] became the hub of socio–economic activities with the Lianga Bay Logging Company Incorporated [LBLCI] which was a rich source of income. The town of Lianga, too that time started to gain a breakthrough not only in the infrastructure projects such as roads and government buildings but also in income derived from taxes especially from forest products used by the wood processing plant of LBLCI. Barangay Saint Christine has become the minor urban center and Lianga was classified as the influence center of the satellite municipalities of San Agustin, Marihatag, and Barobo.

Lianga is a relatively urbanized area where 13,830 or 55.30% of the total population live in the three urban centers of Barangays Poblacion, Saint Christine, and Diatagon [Jiatagon] and 11,175 or 44.70% lives in the remaining rural barangay with a municipal population density equivalent to 98.70% person/km^{2}. The economic situation in the municipality poses great challenges to its leader and people. Its economy remains predominantly agricultural. It is gifted by its geographic location but is not adequately blessed by nature with substantial endowment necessary to propel itself into a developing economy. The major crop is coconut, covering an area of 4,236 hectares. Rice ranks second with an area of 1,890 hectares. Other crops are corn, banana, and abaca. The Poblacion and Barangay Diatagon [Jiatagon] are the trading centers with most of the commodities coming from Davao, Butuan, and Surigao. The poor road condition limits the economic activities in the area.

== Geography ==
=== Barangays ===
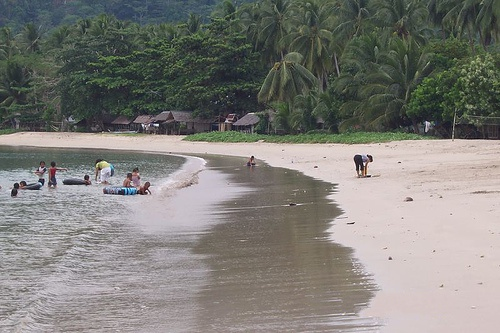
Pugad Beach Resort

Lianga is politically subdivided into 13 barangays. Each barangay consists of puroks, while some have sitios.

- Anibongan
- Ban-as
- Banahao
- Baucawe
- Diatagon [Jiatagon] (also has a large public market)
- Ganayon
- Liatimco
- Manyayay [which also contains Exemeria]
- Payasan
- Poblacion
- Saint Christine
- San Isidro
- San Pedro

=== Climate ===
Climate data for Lianga
Month	Jan	Feb	Mar	Apr	May	Jun	Jul	Aug	Sep	Oct	Nov	Dec	Year
Mean daily maximum °C (°F)	28.8 (83.8)	29.0 (84.2)	29.8 (85.6)	30.9 (87.6)	31.5 (88.7)	31.4 (88.5)	31.5 (88.7)	31.6 (88.9)	31.6 (88.9)	31.2 (88.2)	30.4 (86.7)	29.4 (84.9)	30.6 (87.1)
Daily mean °C (°F)	25.2 (77.4)	25.3 (77.5)	25.8 (78.4)	26.6 (79.9)	27.2 (81.0)	27.0 (80.6)	27.1 (80.8)	27.1 (80.8)	27.0 (80.6)	26.9 (80.4)	26.3 (79.3)	25.7 (78.3)	26.4 (79.6)
Mean daily minimum °C (°F)	21.6 (70.9)	21.6 (70.9)	21.9 (71.4)	22.4 (72.3)	23.0 (73.4)	22.7 (72.9)	22.7 (72.9)	22.7 (72.9)	22.5 (72.5)	22.6 (72.7)	22.2 (72.0)	22.0 (71.6)	22.3 (72.2)
Average rainfall mm (inches)	639 (25.2)	486 (19.1)	401 (15.8)	288 (11.3)	259 (10.2)	217 (8.5)	205 (8.1)	194 (7.6)	205 (8.1)	220 (8.7)	334 (13.1)	532 (20.9)	3,980 (156.6)
Source: Climate-Data.org

Lianga has a tropical rainforest climate (Af) with heavy to very heavy rainfall year-round.

== Demographics ==
Population census of Lianga
Year	Pop.	±% p.a.
1903	5,471	—
1918	8,789	+3.21%
1939	15,770	+2.82%
1948	15,872	+0.07%
1960	17,182	+0.66%
1970	18,742	+0.87%
1975	19,897	+1.21%
1980	22,981	+2.92%
1990	24,908	+0.81%
1995	25,005	+0.07%
2000	25,014	+0.01%
2007	27,006	+1.06%
2010	28,905	+2.50%
2015	29,493	+0.38%
2020	33,869	+2.95%
2024	34,213	+0.24%
Source: Philippine Statistics Authority

== Economy ==
Poverty incidence of Lianga (%)

Source: Philippine Statistics Authority

== Culture ==
=== Festival ===
Inatu Festival – "Inatu" is from the kamayo language means "our very own". The festival is celebrated annually on October, but recent events shifted it to be celebrated in August 2025.

== Education ==
- North Eastern Mindanao State University – Lianga Campus
- Lianga National Comprehensive High School
- R. Moreno Integrated School
- St. Christine National High School (Fishery)
- Anibongan National High School
- Davisol National High School
- Diatagon Catholic High School (Private) and 19 Elementary Schools including Our Lady of Pompei School (Private)

=== Lumad schools ===
There are several Lumad community schools built by Lumad tribes themselves.

- Alternative Learning Center for Agricultural and Livelihood Development (ALCADEV) Inc.
- Tribal Filipino Program of Surigao del Sur (TRIFPSS) Inc.

These Lumad schools have been in the vanguard in fighting for the ancestral lands and the rights of the Lumad.

The Department of Education (Deped) recognized the Lumad community schools and the ALCADEV system through the Indigenous framework of education now observed by alternative tribal schools nationwide. The policy framework was signed in 2012 by then-Secretary Armin Luistro.

2015 Lianga Massacre

On September 1, 2015, executive director of ALCADEV was killed right inside the school premises while two other Lumad leaders, Dionel Campos, and Datu Bello Sinzo were killed in front of the community by the paramilitary group Magahat-Bagani.

National Literacy Awards

These Lumad schools in Lianga have been awarded the Most Outstanding Literacy Program of Caraga region and in the Philippines for several years. This award is given by the Department of Education – Literacy Coordinating Council.

== Tourism ==
- Bao-bao Falls – Barangay Diatagon
- Puro or Lianga Lighthouse – Barangay Poblacion
- Tagago Beach – Barangay Poblacion
- Kansilad Beach – Barangay Ganayon
- Lawis Beach – Barangay Banahao
- Causeway Beach – Barangay St. Christine
- Mahogany Road – Barangay Diatagon
- Little Nest or Tagaytay – Barangay San Pedro
- Pocto Cave – Barangay Manyayay
- Pamutuanan Cave – Barangay Liatimco
- Gran Ola Eco Surf Camp – Barangay Banahao (Lawis)
- Ocean Point Beach Resort – Barangay Banahao (Lawis)
- Baugo Seaside Resort – Barangay Baucawe
- Busay Falls – Barangay Payasan
- Ancestral Houses – Barangay Poblacion
- Baywalk – Barangay Poblacion
- Olè Beach + Resto – Barangay Poblacion
- Davisol Mountain Trekking – Barangay Manyayay
- Casa Lovena by the Sea Resort – Barangay Baucawe
