= Barobo =

Municipality in Surigao Del Sur, Philippines

- Municipality
- Municipality of Barobo
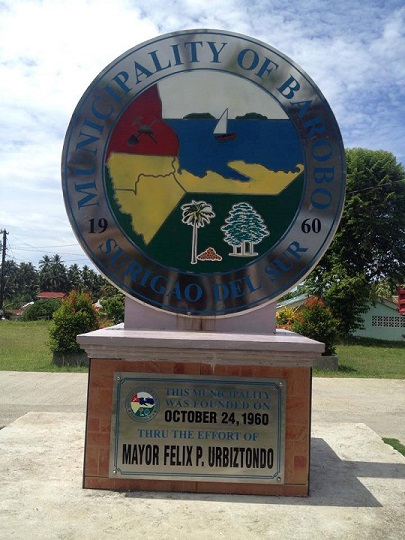
- Barobo plaque with official seal

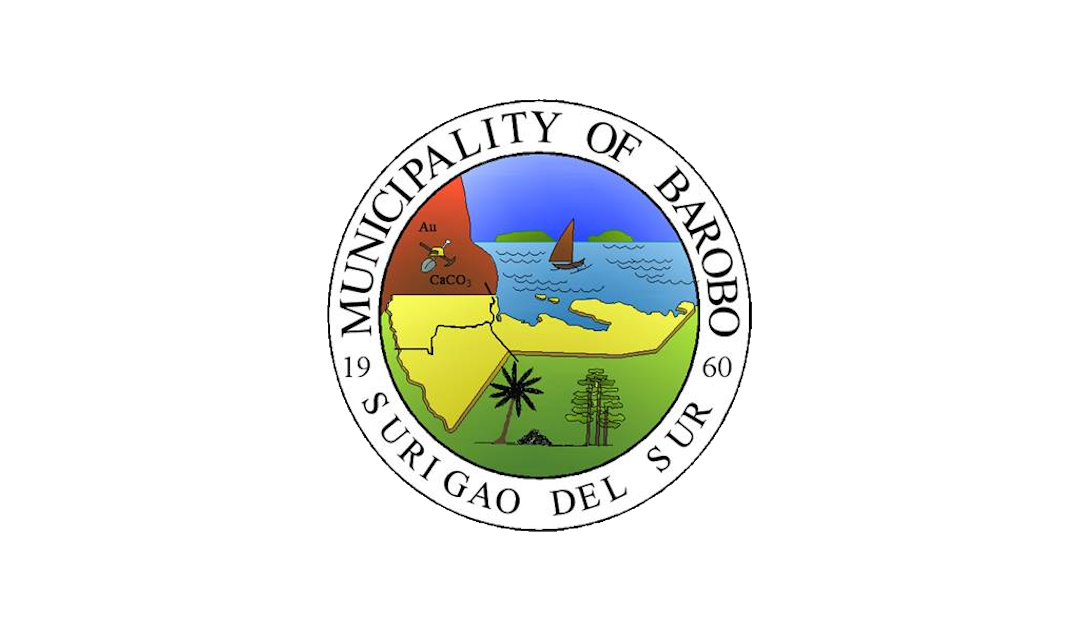
- Flag Seal
- Nickname: The Breathtaking Paradise of the Pacific
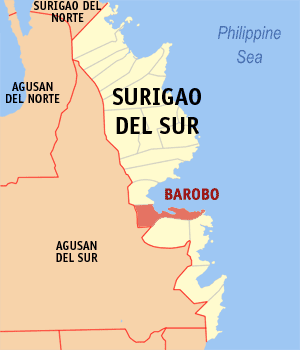
- Map of Surigao del Sur with Barobo highlighted
- Interactive map of Barobo
- Location within the Philippines
- Coordinates: 8°31′45″N 126°07′18″E
- Country: Philippines
- Region: Caraga
- Province: Surigao del Sur
- District: 2nd district
- Founded: October 24, 1960
- Barangays: 22 (see Barangays)

Government
  - Type: Sangguniang Bayan
  - Mayor: Ronito L. Martizano
  - Vice Mayor: Allan C. Bernal
  - Representative: Alexander T. Pimentel
  - Electorate: 39,312 voters (2025)

Area
  - Total: 242.50 km^{2} (93.63 sq mi)
- Elevation: 48 m (157 ft)
- Highest elevation: 279 m (915 ft)
- Lowest elevation: 0 m (0 ft)

Population (2024 census)
  - Total: 53,729
  - Density: 221.56/km^{2} (573.85/sq mi)
  - Households: 12,015
- Demonym: Barobohanon

Economy
  - Income class: 1st municipal income class
  - Poverty incidence: 20.54% (2023)
  - Revenue: ₱ 303.4 million (2024)
  - Assets: ₱ 604.1 million (2024)
  - Expenditure: ₱ 221.9 million (2024)
  - Liabilities: ₱ 117.5 million (2024)

Service provider
  - Electricity: Surigao del Sur 1 Electric Cooperative (SURSECO 1)
- Time zone: UTC+8 (PST)
- ZIP code: 8309
- PSGC: 1606801000
- IDD : area code: +63 (0)86
- Native languages: Surigaonon; Agusan; Cebuano; Kamayo; Tagalog
- Website: www.barobo.gov.ph

Barobo, officially the Municipality of Barobo (Surigaonon: Lungsod nan Barobo; Tagalog: Bayan ng Barobo) is a municipality in the province of Surigao del Sur, Philippines. According to the 2024 census, it has a population of 53,729 people.

== History ==
Legend has it that the Manobo tribesmen first inhabited the area in the central part of Surigao del Sur. Sometime in the 1930s, five families who were engaged in fishing landed in the up-end of the river, and settled in the area for easy access to the fishing grounds. The area became known for its bountiful fish catch, and therefore more people from neighboring areas also came and settled. The distinctive visual quality of the area was an endemic species of tree known as "barobo" (diplodiscus paniculatus), which was plentiful on the site of the settlement. Subsequently, the place became popularly known as Barobo.

Barobo subsequently became a barrio under the municipality of Lianga. The creation of the province of Surigao del Sur under R.A. No. 2786, series of June 1960, created the municipality of Barobo on October 24, 1960, by virtue of Executive Order No. 407 issued by President Carlos P. Garcia. Thus the Municipality of Barobo was carved out (in a shape resembling that of a cigar pipe) from its mother municipality, Lianga.

== Geography ==
Barobo lies in the central part of the province of Surigao del Sur. It is located between 8'34'00" and 8'25'00" latitude and 125'59"00 and 126'22'4" longitude. It is bounded on the north by Lianga Bay and the municipality of Lianga, on the south by the municipality of Tagbina, on the southeast by the municipality of Hinatuan, on the east by the Pacific Ocean, and on the west by the municipality of San Francisco, Agusan del Sur.

It has total land area of 24,250 hectares (59,900 acres). It is linked by a national road to the provincial capital of Tandag, Surigao del Sur, of 103 kilometers (64 mi) and the gateway to the regional center of the Caraga Region in Butuan of 107 kilometers (66 mi).

=== Tourism ===
15,000 hectares (37,000 acres) of its total land is used for the tourism industry with declared tourist destinations namely, Turtle Island, Cabgan Island, Vanishing Islet, Pongpong Resort, Pagbutuanan Cave, Bogac Cold Spring, Beto Lagoon, Panaraga Beach Resorts and Dapdap Beach Resorts. The Barobo River was named as the cleanest urban river in the country by numerous blogging award-giving bodies.

=== Barangays ===
Barobo is politically subdivided into 22 barangays. Each barangay consists of puroks while some have sitios.

- Amaga
- Bahi
- Cabacungan
- Cambagang
- Causwagan
- Dapdap
- Dughan
- Gamut
- Guinhalinan
- Javier
- Kinayan
- Mamis
- Poblacion
- Guinhalinan
- Rizal
- San Jose
- San Roque
- San Vicente (Poblacion)
- Sua
- Sudlon
- Tambis
- Unidad
- Wakat

=== Climate ===
Climate data for Barobo
Month	Jan	Feb	Mar	Apr	May	Jun	Jul	Aug	Sep	Oct	Nov	Dec	Year
Mean daily maximum °C (°F)	29.0 (84.2)	29.1 (84.4)	30.1 (86.2)	31.1 (88.0)	31.7 (89.1)	31.6 (88.9)	31.7 (89.1)	31.9 (89.4)	31.9 (89.4)	31.5 (88.7)	30.7 (87.3)	29.7 (85.5)	30.8 (87.5)
Daily mean °C (°F)	25.3 (77.5)	25.4 (77.7)	26.1 (79.0)	26.8 (80.2)	27.4 (81.3)	27.2 (81.0)	27.2 (81.0)	27.3 (81.1)	27.3 (81.1)	27.1 (80.8)	26.5 (79.7)	25.9 (78.6)	26.6 (79.9)
Mean daily minimum °C (°F)	21.7 (71.1)	21.8 (71.2)	22.1 (71.8)	22.6 (72.7)	23.2 (73.8)	22.9 (73.2)	22.7 (72.9)	22.8 (73.0)	22.7 (72.9)	22.7 (72.9)	22.4 (72.3)	22.2 (72.0)	22.5 (72.5)
Average rainfall mm (inches)	639 (25.2)	482 (19.0)	402 (15.8)	297 (11.7)	264 (10.4)	227 (8.9)	207 (8.1)	198 (7.8)	211 (8.3)	221 (8.7)	325 (12.8)	535 (21.1)	4,008 (157.8)
Source: Climate-Data.org

Barobo has a tropical rainforest climate (Af) with heavy to very heavy rainfall year-round.

== Demographics ==
Population census of Barobo
Year	Pop.	±% p.a.
1970	16,717	—
1975	21,090	+4.77%
1980	23,346	+2.05%
1990	32,991	+3.52%
1995	32,226	−0.44%
2000	34,558	+1.51%
2007	40,933	+2.36%
2010	43,663	+2.38%
2015	49,730	+2.51%
2020	53,146	+1.41%
2024	53,729	+0.26%
Source: Philippine Statistics Authority

=== Language ===
A native Barobohanon speaks Kamayo, a minor language spoken in the area of Barobo and also in Bislig, San Agustin and Marihatag, Surigao del Sur province in the southern Philippines. It has 7,565 speakers (2000, WCD). The dialect known as "Kamayo" varies from one municipality to another — Lingiganons are quite different from other municipalities on the way they speak the Kamayo language.

== Economy ==
Poverty incidence of Barobo (%)

Source: Philippine Statistics Authority
