= Hinatuan Enchanted River =

River in Surigao del Sur, Philippines

Hinatuan Enchanted River Hinatuan Sacred River
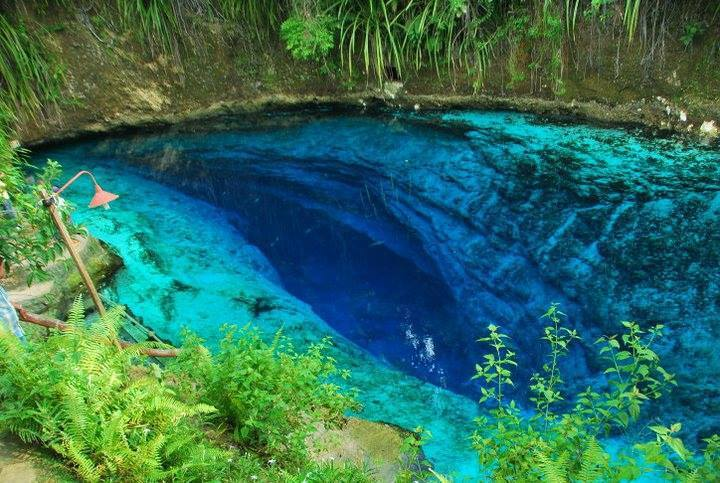

- Location within Mindanao mainland Location within Philippines

Location
- Country: Philippines
- Region: Caraga
- Province: Surigao del Sur
- City/municipality: Hinatuan

Physical characteristics
- Mouth: Hinatuan Bay
  - location: Hinatuan
  - coordinates: 8°22′11″N 126°20′18″E
- Length: 0.27 km (0.17 mi)
- Discharge
  - location: Philippine Sea

The Hinatuan Enchanted River, also called the Hinatuan Sacred River, is a deep spring river on the island of Mindanao in the Philippines. It flows into the Philippine Sea and the Pacific Ocean at Barangay Talisay, Hinatuan, Surigao del Sur. It is found between the boundaries of Barangays of Talisay and Cambatong. It earned the moniker "enchanted river" from the diplomat Modesto Farolan who described the river in his poem entitled "Rio Encantado".

== Geography ==
Hinatuan Bay, which is the habitat of various species of turtles, is located at its mouth. Its mouth also offers a safe anchorage against storms and typhoons.

== Exploration ==
The first exploration to the cave of the Hinatuan Enchanted River was made by Alex Santos in 1999. The major exploration to the cave system started eleven years later when a group of three cave divers led by Dr. Alfonso Amores with team members Bernil Gastardo and Emgee Guillermo entered the cave in February 2010. The major exploration led to the discovery of a hidden cave opening at 30 metres (98 ft) depth. Succeeding expeditions have been made that led to the discovery of the underwater cave's chamber. During its sixth expedition on June 17, 2014, Dr. Amores died after failing to exit the narrow entrance to the cave due to a cardiac arrest at 40 metres (130 ft) depth inside the narrow tunnel to the Mayor's Chamber of the cave in the Hinatuan Enchanted River.

Explorations continued in March 2015 aiming to explore the area beyond its 82 metres (269 ft) depth and are now led by Bernil Gastardo under contract with GIZ, University of San Carlos-Biology Department, and DENR-BMB under the project Hinatuan Enchanted River Underwater Cave System Rapid Source Assessment (HERUCS). Beginning on March 20, a collaborative 5-day assessment and mapping of the ecosystem was conducted by the University of San Carlos and the Filipino Cave Divers (FCD).

== Legends ==
The river's unusual colors and unexplored depths have inspired various local legends. One story tells of fairies that added the colors of sapphire and jade to the river to make its unique shade. Local fisherfolk also report seeing fish in the river that cannot be caught through any means. According to locals, the river was called the Enchanted River because of the engkantos that dwell there. Their legends also say that the river is haunted by supernatural beings which act as its protectors.

== Preservation ==
Since 2017, the local government of Hinatuan has prohibited tourists from swimming in the main pool due to preservation and maintenance. However, they have designated a swimming area for tourists near the center of the lagoon which is 10 metres (33 ft) away from the main pool. The daily fish feeding schedule was also changed from 12 noon to 3 in the afternoon. This is done by playing the "Hymn of Hinatuan".
