= Cagwait =

Municipality in Surigao del Sur, Philippines

- Municipality
- Municipality of Cagwait
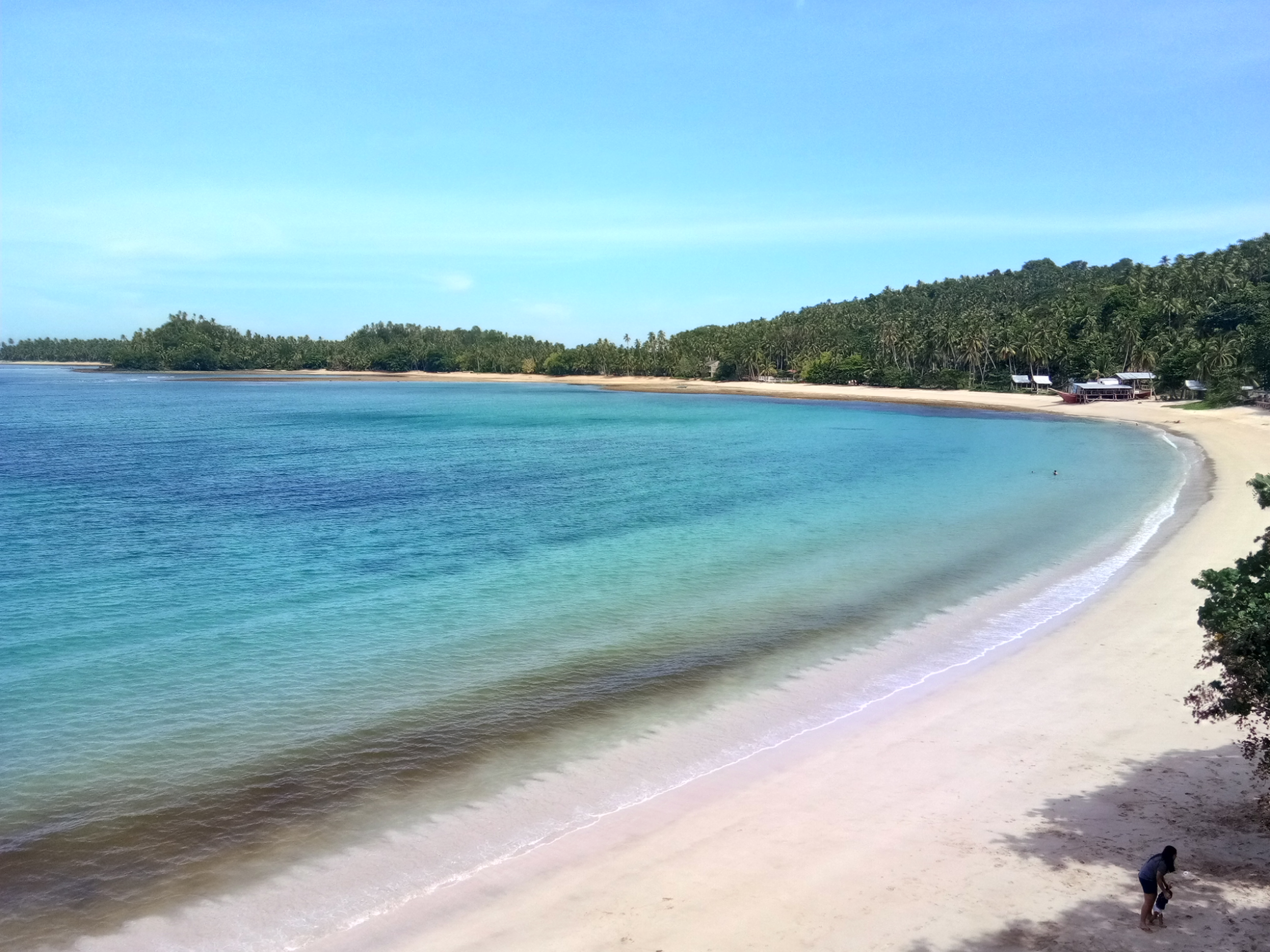
- Cagwait White Beach

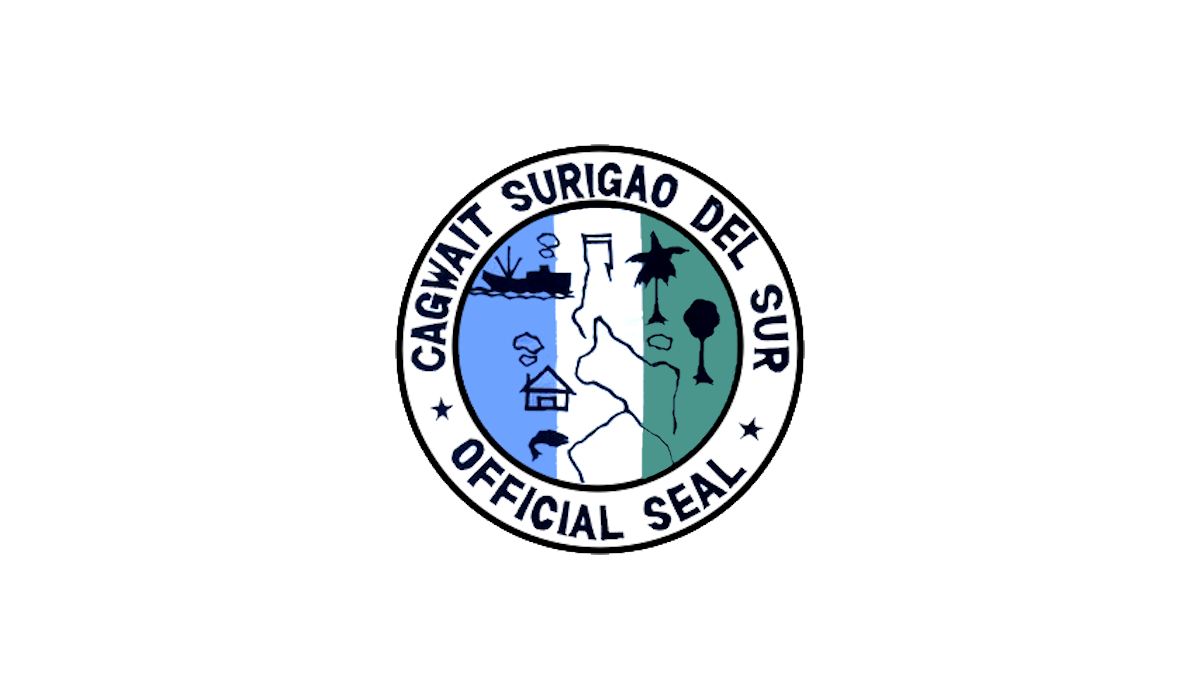
- Flag

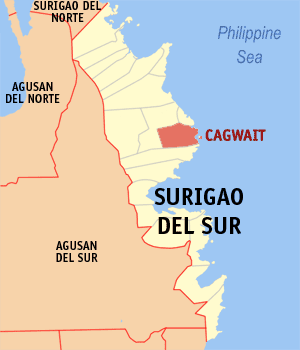
- Map of Surigao del Sur with Cagwait highlighted
- Interactive map of Cagwait
- Location within the Philippines
- Coordinates: 8°55′05″N 126°18′06″E
- Country: Philippines
- Region: Caraga
- Province: Surigao del Sur
- District: 1st district
- Founded: 1782
- Barangays: 11 (see Barangays)

Government
  - Type: Sangguniang Bayan
  - Mayor: Glenn G. Batiancila
  - Vice Mayor: Melchie C. Tuscano
  - Representative: Romeo S. Momo Sr.
  - Electorate: 15,905 voters (2025)

Area
  - Total: 214.10 km^{2} (82.66 sq mi)
- Elevation: 51 m (167 ft)
- Highest elevation: 275 m (902 ft)
- Lowest elevation: 0 m (0 ft)

Population (2024 census)
  - Total: 22,305
  - Density: 104.18/km^{2} (269.83/sq mi)
  - Households: 5,060

Economy
  - Income class: 2nd municipal income class
  - Poverty incidence: 17.2% (2023)
  - Revenue: ₱ 190 million (2024)
  - Assets: ₱ 727.3 million (2024)
  - Expenditure: ₱ 73.38 million (2024)
  - Liabilities: ₱ 162.7 million (2024)

Service provider
  - Electricity: Surigao del Sur 2 Electric Cooperative (SURSECO 2)
- Time zone: UTC+8 (PST)
- ZIP code: 8304
- PSGC: 1606804000
- IDD : area code: +63 (0)86
- Native languages: Surigaonon; Agusan; Cebuano; Tagalog
- Website: www.cagwait.gov.ph

Cagwait, officially the Municipality of Cagwait (Surigaonon: Lungsod nan Cagwait; Tagalog: Bayan ng Cagwait), is a municipality in the province of Surigao del Sur, Philippines. According to the 2024 census, it has a population of 22,305 people.

== History ==
Cagwait was spelled "Cacuait" or "Caguait" during the Spanish and American colonial period.

== Geography ==
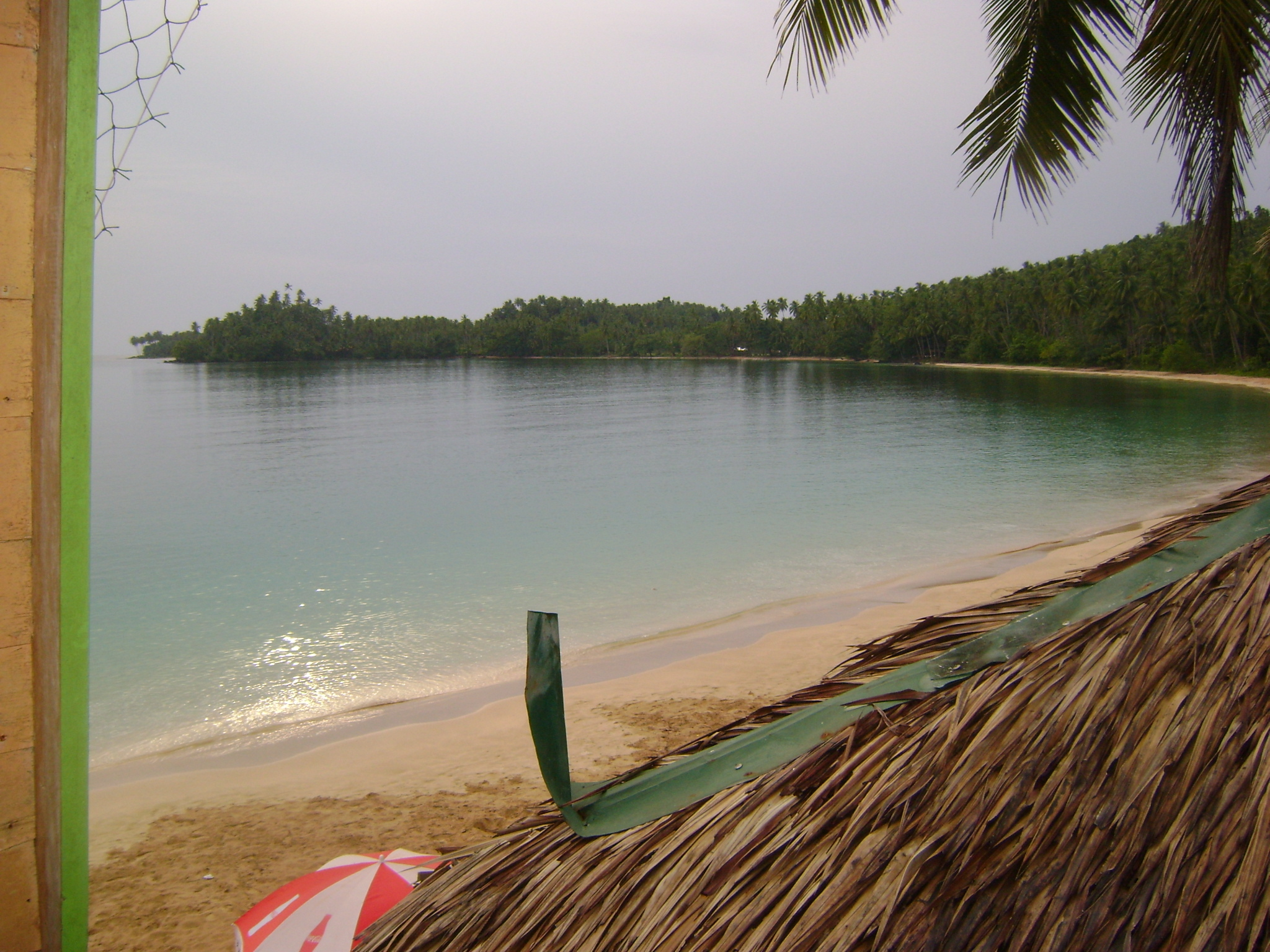
Seashore at a beach located in Cagwait

Cagwait is politically subdivided into 11 barangays.

Cagwait is about 32 kilometres (20 mi) southeast of Tandag, the capital town of Surigao del Sur. It is bounded by the towns of Bayabas on the north, Marihatag on the south, the Diwata mountains on the west and the Pacific Ocean in the east. It has a total land area of 21,410 hectares (52,900 acres).

=== Barangays ===
Cagwait is politically subdivided into 11 barangays. Each barangay consists of puroks while some have sitios.

- Aras-asan
- Bacolod
- Bitaugan East
- Bitaugan West
- La Purisima (Palhe)
- Lactudan
- Mat-e
- Poblacion
- Tawagan
- Tubo-tubo
- Unidad

=== Climate ===
Climate data for Cagwait
| Month | Jan | Feb | Mar | Apr | May | Jun | Jul | Aug | Sep | Oct | Nov | Dec | Year |
|---|---|---|---|---|---|---|---|---|---|---|---|---|---|
| Mean daily maximum °C (°F) | 28.9 (84.0) | 29.0 (84.2) | 29.9 (85.8) | 31.0 (87.8) | 31.8 (89.2) | 31.8 (89.2) | 31.7 (89.1) | 32.0 (89.6) | 32.0 (89.6) | 31.5 (88.7) | 30.5 (86.9) | 29.6 (85.3) | 30.8 (87.5) |
| Daily mean °C (°F) | 25.5 (77.9) | 25.5 (77.9) | 26.1 (79.0) | 27.0 (80.6) | 27.7 (81.9) | 27.6 (81.7) | 27.4 (81.3) | 27.6 (81.7) | 27.5 (81.5) | 27.3 (81.1) | 26.6 (79.9) | 26.1 (79.0) | 26.8 (80.3) |
| Mean daily minimum °C (°F) | 22.2 (72.0) | 22.1 (71.8) | 22.4 (72.3) | 23.0 (73.4) | 23.6 (74.5) | 23.4 (74.1) | 23.2 (73.8) | 23.3 (73.9) | 23.1 (73.6) | 23.1 (73.6) | 22.8 (73.0) | 22.6 (72.7) | 22.9 (73.2) |
| Average rainfall mm (inches) | 715 (28.1) | 604 (23.8) | 444 (17.5) | 321 (12.6) | 264 (10.4) | 182 (7.2) | 192 (7.6) | 155 (6.1) | 172 (6.8) | 207 (8.1) | 451 (17.8) | 619 (24.4) | 4,326 (170.4) |
Source: Climate-Data.org

Cagwait has a tropical rainforest climate (Af) with heavy to very heavy rainfall year-round and with extremely heavy rainfall in January.

== Demographics ==
Population census of Cagwait
| Year | Pop. | ±% p.a. |
|---|---|---|
| 1960 | 7,654 | — |
| 1970 | 10,622 | +3.33% |
| 1975 | 11,861 | +2.24% |
| 1980 | 14,160 | +3.61% |
| 1990 | 16,868 | +1.77% |
| 1995 | 17,001 | +0.15% |
| 2000 | 18,577 | +1.92% |
| 2007 | 19,899 | +0.95% |
| 2010 | 18,899 | −1.86% |
| 2015 | 20,384 | +1.45% |
| 2020 | 21,747 | +1.37% |
| 2024 | 22,305 | +0.61% |
Source: Philippine Statistics Authority

== Economy ==
Poverty incidence of Cagwait (%)

Source: Philippine Statistics Authority

Cagwait has an all-weather port at Barangay Bitaugan West (named Aras-asan Port by the Philippine Ports Authority) secured by the natural protection of Arangasa Islands. It has also an abandoned aerodrome made and used by the private planes of Aras-asan Timber Company, Inc. (ARTIMCO) during its peak of timber operation in the late 1970s.

Barangay Poblacion is the seat of governance, while the center of trade of the municipality is in Barangay Aras-asan. It houses three rural banks, two pawnshops, three bakeshops, a radio station, a public terminal and public market. Telecommunication is on par with other neighboring municipalities using cell phones, and Internet via GPRS, and cable television are available. There are also good tourist inns, beach resorts and homestay (bread and breakfast). Motorized tricycles, jeepneys, and buses ply its roads and concrete highways.

Cagwait was the home of the now defunct company ARTIMCO, Inc., one of the largest suppliers of timber in the country. Its land holdings became a sanctuary of the Philippine Eagle. Its land holdings became a sanctuary of the Philippine Eagle which was discovered by Charles Lindbergh during his wildlife expedition. He also discovered the beautiful white-sand beach cove of Cagwait which he described as similar to Waikiki Beach in Hawaii.

Cagwait beach is the venue for the popular annual Kaliguan festival. Normally held towards the end of June, the festival is held over three days. A temporary stage is constructed on the beach and features music and a beauty pageant known as Perlas Ng Kaliguan. The most recent festival held in June 2019 was the 23rd annual Kaliguan festival.

== Notable personalities ==
- Elmar Sillador – 1992 Philippine National Police Medal of Valor recipient
