= Lingig =

Municipality in Surigao del Sur, Philippines

- Municipality
- Municipality of Lingig
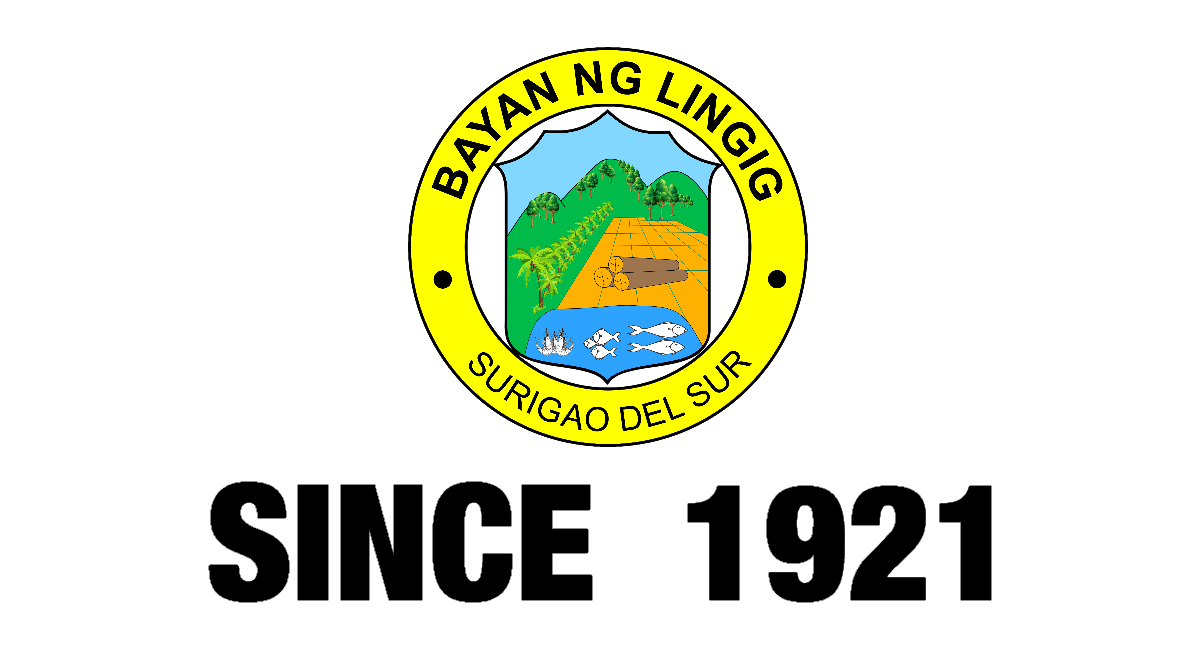
- Flag

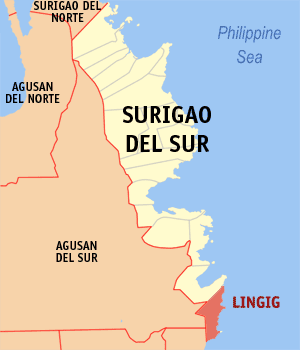
- Map of Surigao del Sur with Lingig highlighted
- Interactive map of Lingig
- Location within the Philippines
- Coordinates: 8°02′17″N 126°24′46″E
- Country: Philippines
- Region: Caraga
- Province: Surigao del Sur
- District: 2nd district
- Barangays: 18 (see Barangays)

Government
  - Type: Sangguniang Bayan
  - Mayor: Elmer P. Evangelio
  - Vice Mayor: Arnold Malaque
  - Representative: Alexander T. Pimentel
  - Electorate: 24,720 voters (2025)

Area
  - Total: 305.17 km^{2} (117.83 sq mi)
- Elevation: 101 m (331 ft)
- Highest elevation: 1,625 m (5,331 ft)
- Lowest elevation: 0 m (0 ft)

Population (2024 census)
  - Total: 35,203
  - Density: 115.36/km^{2} (298.77/sq mi)
  - Households: 8,593

Economy
  - Income class: 1st municipal income class
  - Poverty incidence: 24.8% (2023)
  - Revenue: ₱ 224.1 million (2024)
  - Assets: ₱ 451.9 million (2024)
  - Expenditure: ₱ 242.6 million (2024)
  - Liabilities: ₱ 160.9 million (2024)

Service provider
  - Electricity: Surigao del Sur 1 Electric Cooperative (SURSECO 1)
- Time zone: UTC+8 (PST)
- ZIP code: 8312
- PSGC: 1606812000
- IDD : area code: +63 (0)86
- Native languages: Surigaonon; Agusan; Cebuano; Kamayo; Tagalog
- Website: www.lgulingig.webs.com

Lingig, officially the Municipality of Lingig, is a municipality in the province of Surigao del Sur, Philippines. According to the 2024 census, it had a population of 35,203 people.

The municipality is around one and a half hour away from Barangay Mangagoy, Bislig by bus. It is a border town of Surigao del Sur with Davao Oriental.

== Geography ==
=== Barangays ===
Lingig is politically subdivided into 18 barangays. Each barangay consists of puroks while some have sitios.

- Anibongan
- Barcelona
- Bogak
- Bongan
- Handamayan
- Mahayahay
- Mandus
- Mansa-ilao
- Pagtila-an
- Palo Alto
- Poblacion
- Rajah Cabungso-an
- Sabang
- Salvacion
- San Roque
- Tagpoporan (Tagpupuran)
- Union
- Valencia

=== Climate ===
Climate data for Lingig
Month	Jan	Feb	Mar	Apr	May	Jun	Jul	Aug	Sep	Oct	Nov	Dec	Year
Mean daily maximum °C (°F)	29.5 (85.1)	29.5 (85.1)	30.5 (86.9)	31.3 (88.3)	31.7 (89.1)	31.6 (88.9)	31.6 (88.9)	31.9 (89.4)	32.0 (89.6)	31.7 (89.1)	31.1 (88.0)	30.2 (86.4)	31.1 (87.9)
Daily mean °C (°F)	25.7 (78.3)	25.6 (78.1)	26.3 (79.3)	26.9 (80.4)	27.4 (81.3)	27.2 (81.0)	27.1 (80.8)	27.3 (81.1)	27.3 (81.1)	27.1 (80.8)	26.7 (80.1)	26.2 (79.2)	26.7 (80.1)
Mean daily minimum °C (°F)	21.8 (71.2)	21.8 (71.2)	22.1 (71.8)	22.6 (72.7)	23.1 (73.6)	22.8 (73.0)	22.6 (72.7)	22.7 (72.9)	22.6 (72.7)	22.6 (72.7)	22.4 (72.3)	22.2 (72.0)	22.4 (72.4)
Average rainfall mm (inches)	757 (29.8)	561 (22.1)	495 (19.5)	347 (13.7)	256 (10.1)	165 (6.5)	148 (5.8)	132 (5.2)	140 (5.5)	200 (7.9)	314 (12.4)	644 (25.4)	4,159 (163.9)
Source: Climate-Data.org

Lingig has a tropical rainforest climate (Af) with heavy to very heavy rainfall year-round and with extremely heavy rainfall in January.

== Demographics ==
Population census of Lingig
Year	Pop.	±% p.a.
1903	730	—
1939	5,397	+5.71%
1948	4,462	−2.09%
1960	11,225	+7.99%
1970	13,836	+2.11%
1975	19,172	+6.76%
1980	19,993	+0.84%
1990	21,015	+0.50%
1995	23,477	+2.10%
2000	26,487	+2.62%
2007	28,269	+0.90%
2010	31,544	+4.07%
2015	31,485	−0.04%
2020	35,142	+2.34%
2024	35,203	+0.04%
Source: Philippine Statistics Authority

== Economy ==
Poverty incidence of Lingig (%)

Source: Philippine Statistics Authority
