= Surigao del Sur =

- Province
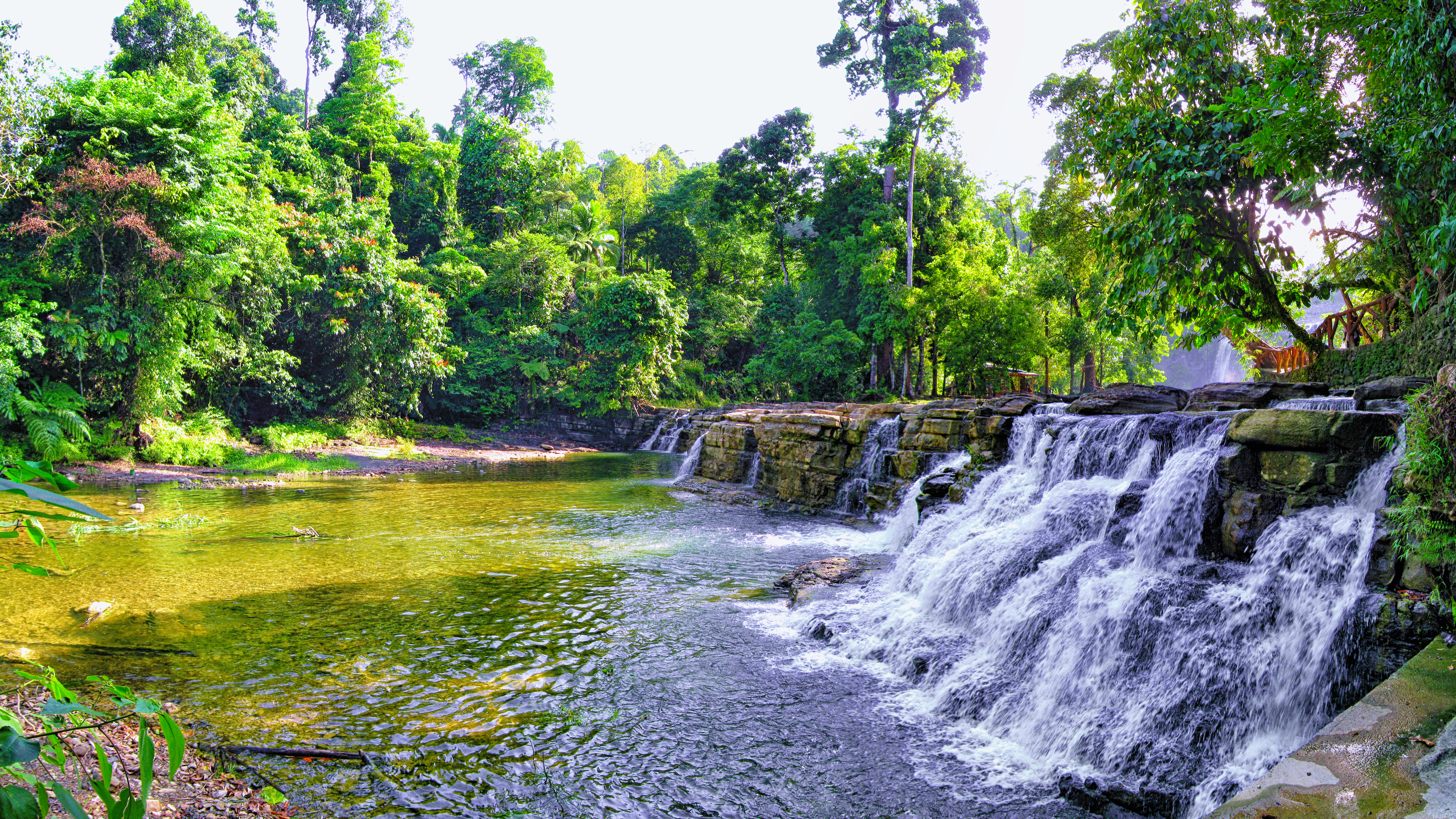
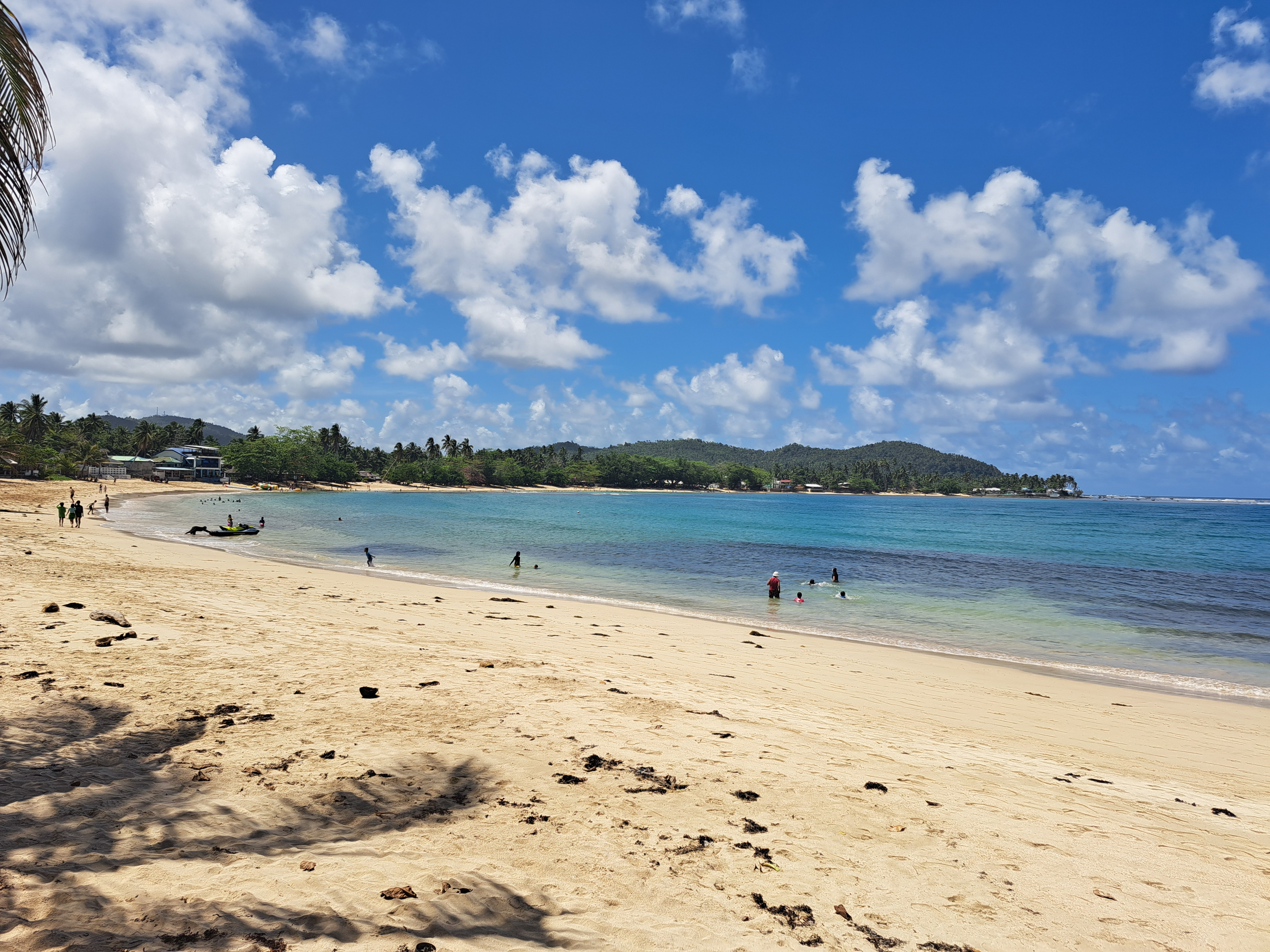
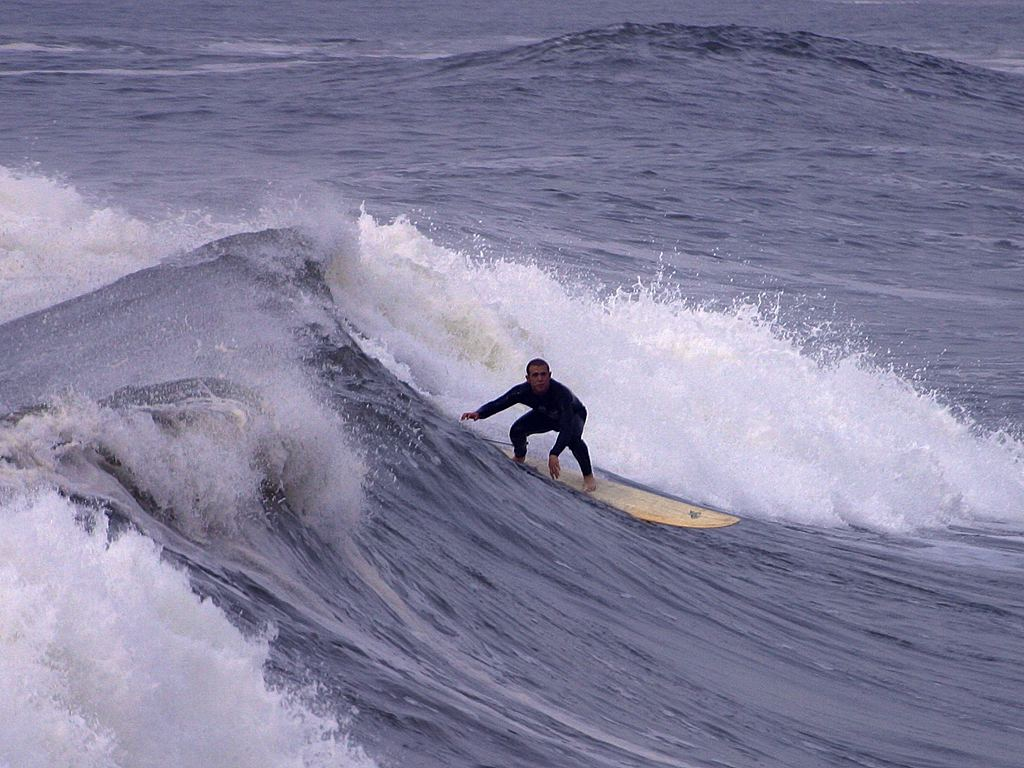
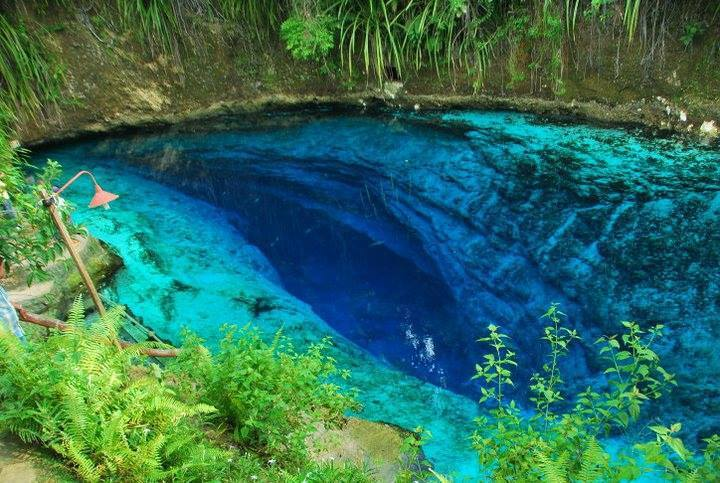
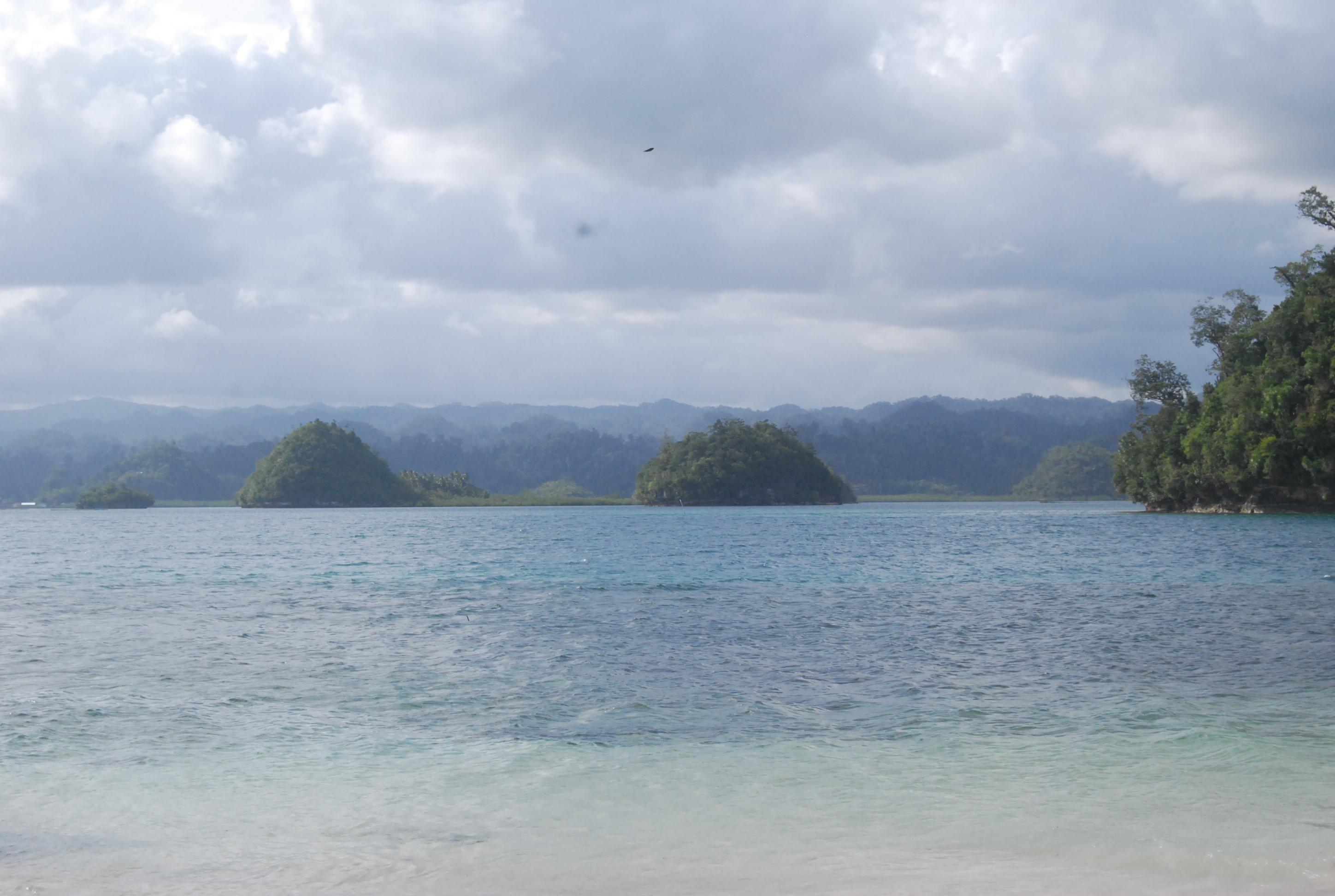
- (from top: left to right) Tinuy-an Falls in Bislig, White beach in Cagwait, surfer in beach of Lanuza, Hinatuan River, Britania Islands, and San Nicolas de Tolentino Cathedral

- Seal
- Nickname: Shangri-La by the Pacific
- Location in the Philippines
- Interactive map of Surigao del Sur
- Coordinates: 8°40′N 126°00′E
- Country: Philippines
- Region: Caraga
- Founded: June 19, 1960
- Capital: Tandag
- Largest city: Bislig

Government
  - Type: Sangguniang Panlalawigan
  - Governor: Johnny T. Pimentel (NUP)
  - Vice Governor: Manuel O. Alameda (PFP)
  - Legislature: Surigao del Sur Provincial Board
  - Electorate: 476,689 voters (2025)

Area
  - Total: 4,932.70 km^{2} (1,904.53 sq mi)
  - Rank: 21st out of 82
- Highest elevation (Mount Diuata): 611 m (2,005 ft)

Population (2024 census)
  - Total: 648,858
  - Rank: 47th out of 82
  - Density: 131.542/km^{2} (340.693/sq mi)
  - Rank: 66th out of 82
  - Households: 150,551
- Demonym: South Surigaonon

Divisions
  - Independent cities: 0
  - Component cities: 2: Bislig; Tandag
  - Municipalities: 17: Barobo; Bayabas; Cagwait; Cantilan; Carmen; Carrascal; Cortes; Hinatuan; Lanuza; Lianga; Lingig; Madrid; Marihatag; San Agustin; San Miguel; Tagbina; Tago
  - Barangays: 309
  - Districts: Legislative districts of Surigao del Sur

Economy
  - Income class: 1st provincial income class
  - Poverty incidence: 10.3% (2023)
  - Revenue: ₱ 2,491 million (2024)
  - Assets: ₱ 9,430 million (2024)
  - Expenditure: ₱ 2,117 million (2024)
  - Liabilities: ₱ 3,367 million (2024)
- Time zone: UTC+8 (PHT)
- PSGC: 166800000
- IDD : area code: +63 (0)86
- ISO 3166 code: PH-SUR
- Spoken languages: Surigaonon; Kamayo; Cebuano; Agusan; Tagalog; English
- Website: www.surigaodelsur.gov.ph

Surigao del Sur (Surigaonon: Probinsya nan Surigao del Sur; Cebuano: Habagatang Surigao; Tagalog: Timog Surigao), officially the Province of Surigao del Sur, is a province in the Philippines located in the Caraga region in Mindanao. Its capital is Tandag City while Bislig is the most populous city in the province. Surigao del Sur is situated at the eastern coast of Mindanao and faces the Philippine Sea to the east.

== Etymology ==
There are two hypotheses on the original meaning of "Surigao" among linguists, depending on the original root word. If the root word was taken to be sulig ("sprout" or "spring up"), then Surigao may have derived from suligao ("spring water"), likely referring to the Surigao River (known as "Suligaw" in Mandaya) that empties at the northern tip of the island of Mindanao. Early historical accounts record the name of the river as Suligao, Surigao, or Zurigan.

Another possibility is that it is derived from Visayan surogao or suyogao, meaning "water current". From suyog (also sulog or surog), "current"; cf. Sinulog, Sulu, and Tausug (Suluk).

== History ==
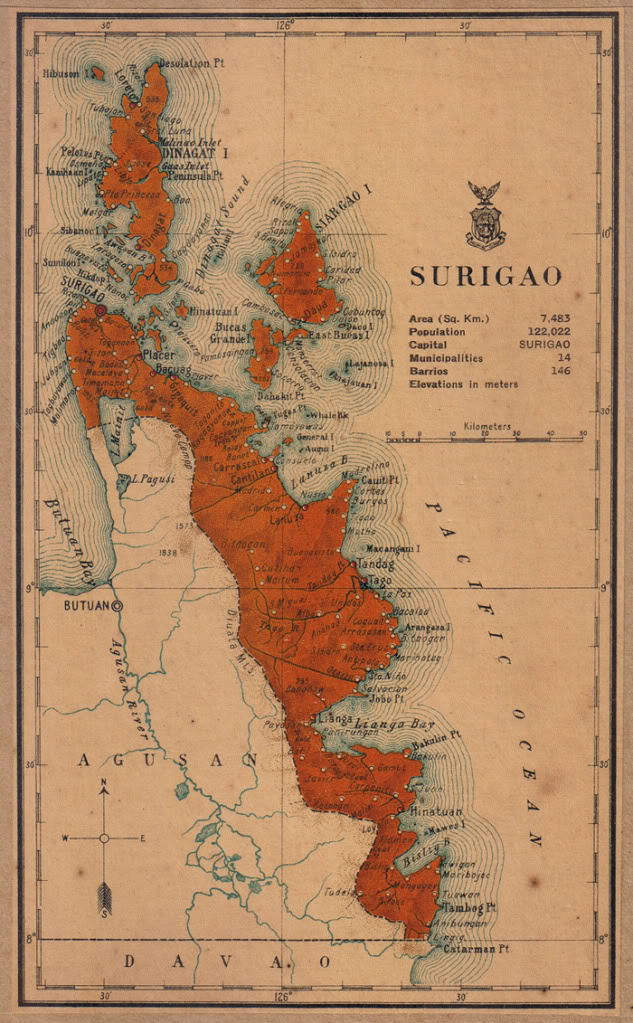
An old map showing the current territories of the province as part of the historical province of Surigao

=== Early history ===
In precolonial times, the region of Surigao was inhabited by the Visayan Surigaonon people in the coastal areas, as well as Lumad groups in the interiors like the Mandaya, Mansaka, Mamanwa and Manobo.

=== Spanish colonial era ===
During the Spanish Occupation in 1860, six military districts were created in Mindanao, with Surigao and Agusan forming the "East District". In 1870, the district was renamed to "Distrito de Surigao".

=== American colonial era ===
In 1901, Distrito de Surigao became chartered province. Agusan became an independent province in 1907 during the American era, when it was separated from Surigao.

=== Philippine independence ===
==== Foundation ====
Surigao del Sur was created as the 56th Philippine province on June 19, 1960, through Republic Act 2786, separated from its mother province, Surigao, on September 18, 1960.

At the time of its inception, it was classified as 4th Class province with an annual income of over ₱300,000.00. Seven years later, because of rapid increase of revenue collection particularly from the logging ventures, it has been reclassified as Ist Class B and in 1980 as Ist Class A with an estimated annual income of around ₱13,000,000. It has been reclassified as 2nd Class with a revenue adding up to ₱315,888,300.63.

Recaredo B. Castillo was the appointed first governor and subsequently elected governor while Vicente L. Pimentel was the first elected congressman.

The province was formed with 13 municipalities. Six more were added, raising the number to 19 with Tandag as the capital. Two of its municipalities have been elevated to cities; the first was Bislig City.

=== Contemporary ===
The capital town Tandag became a component city by virtue of Republic Act No. 9392 which sought to convert the town into a city. The law was ratified on June 23, 2007. However, the cityhood status was lost twice in the years 2008 and 2010 after the LCP questioned the validity of the cityhood law. The cityhood status was reaffirmed after the court finalized its ruling on February 15, 2011 which declared the cityhood law constitutional.

House Bill No. 2336 of the 19th Congress seeks to separate the southern part of the province to be formed as the new Province of Surigao Oriental. Once the bill is signed into law it will be approved and ratified in a referendum.

== Geography ==
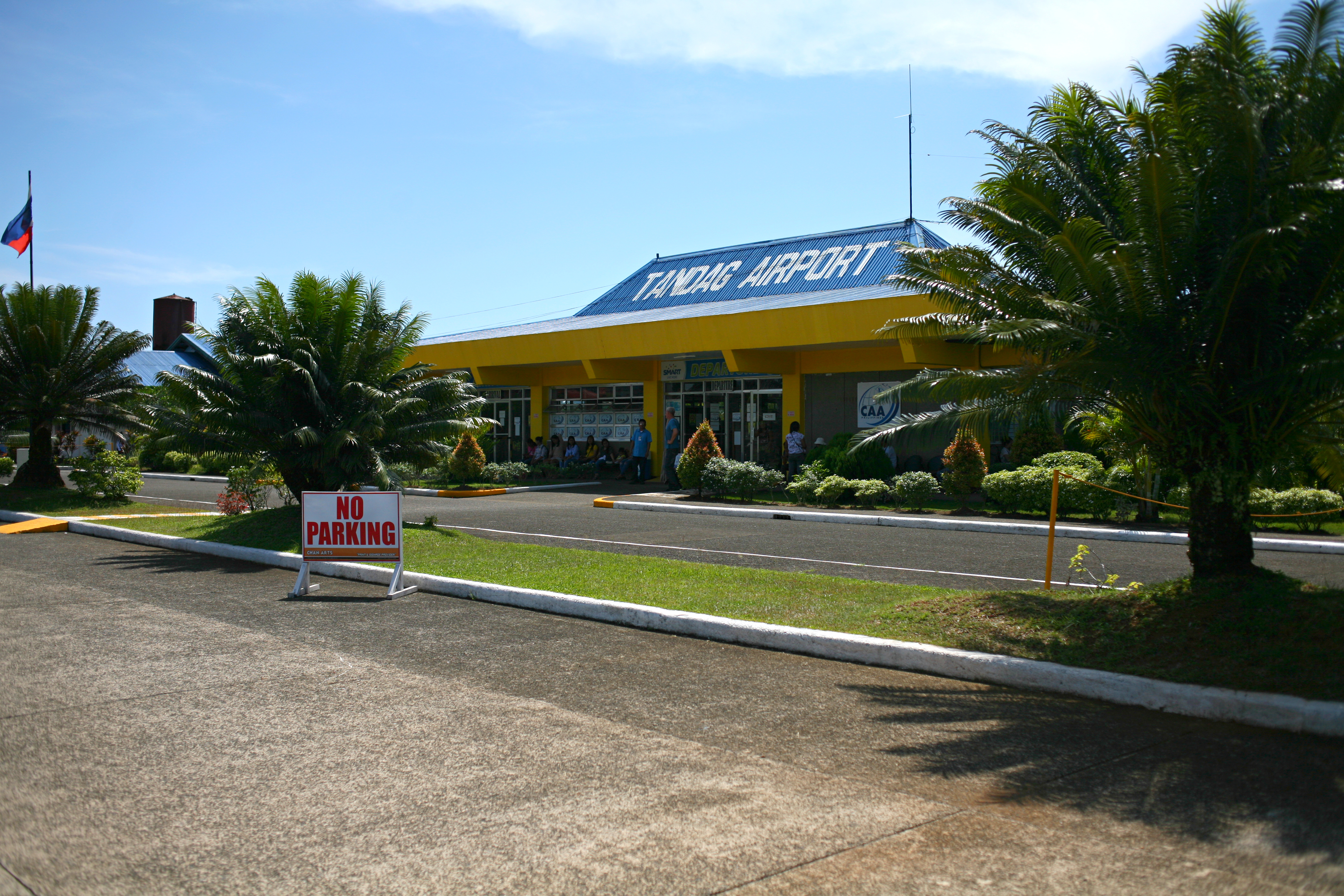
Tandag Airport

Surigao del Sur is located along the northeastern coast of Mindanao facing the Philippine Sea between 125°40' to 126°20' east longitudes and 7°55' and 9°20' north latitudes. It is bounded on the northwest by the province of Surigao del Norte, on the southeast by Davao Oriental, on the west and southwest by Agusan del Norte and Agusan del Sur.

Situated west is the Diwata Mountain Range, isolating the province from the rest of Mindanao. To the east lies the Philippine Sea. The Mindanao Deep, one of the deepest trenches in the world, is situated a few kilometers east of the coastline.

=== Land area ===
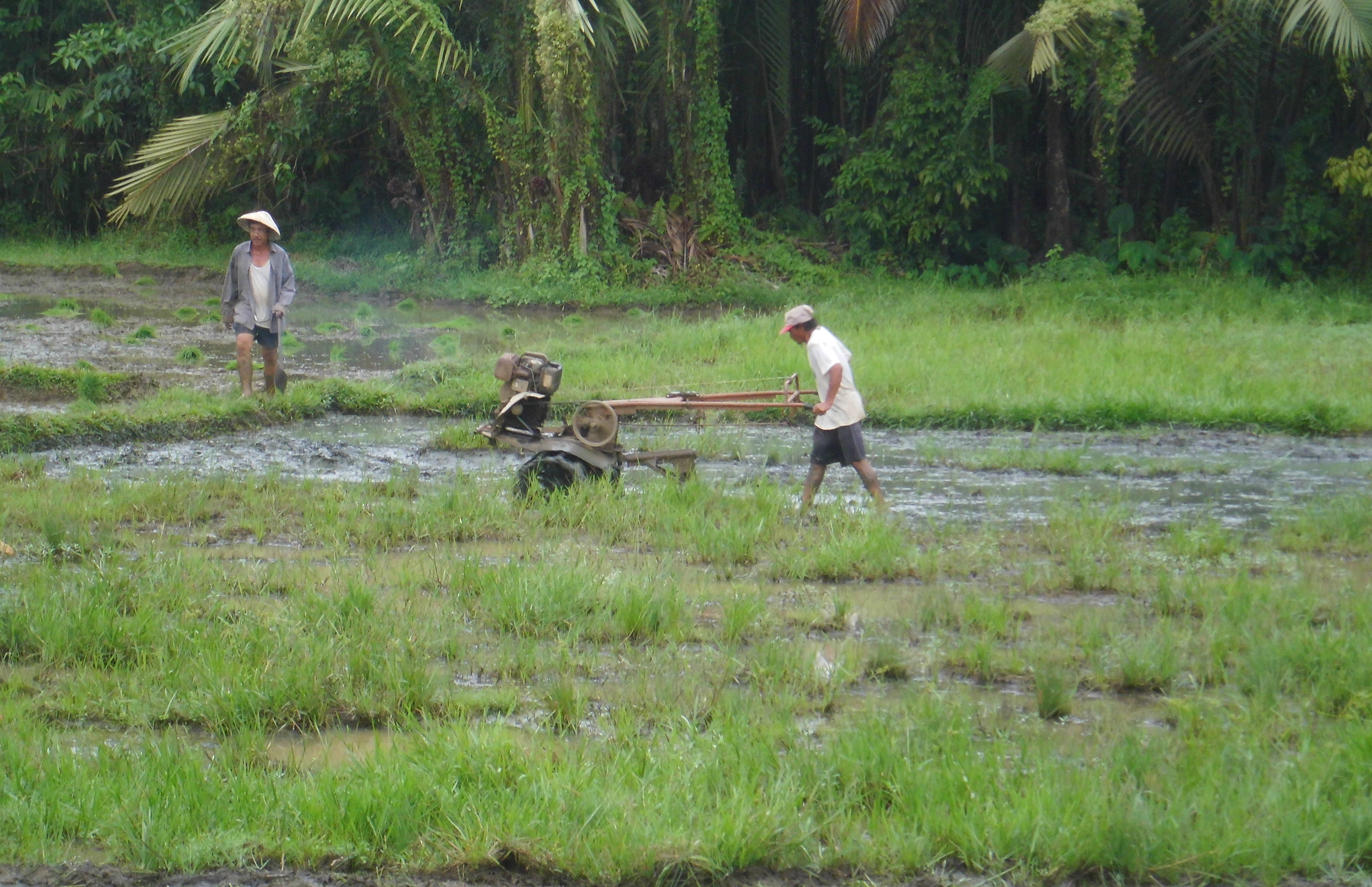
Ricefield in Cantilan

The land area of the province is 4,932.70 square kilometres (1,904.53 sq mi) representing 27.75 percent of the total land area of Caraga Administrative Region and about 5.14 percent and 1.74 percent of the total land area of Mindanao and Philippines, respectively. The province is elongated in shape, extending from the northeastern portion at Carrascal to the southernmost municipality of Lingig. It is approximately 300 kilometres (190 mi) in length and 50 kilometres (31 mi) at its widest point which runs from Cagwait to San Miguel.

Municipal-wise, San Miguel has the biggest land area accounting for 11.31% (558 square kilometers) of the total provincial land area while Bayabas has the smallest constituting only about 2.39% (117.84 square kilometers).

Of the 5,230.50 square kilometres (2,019.51 sq mi) land, only 1,703.72 square kilometres (657.81 sq mi) or 32.22 percent are classified as alienable and disposable (A and D) while 3,583.523 square kilometres (1,383.606 sq mi) or 67.78 percent are forest land. Tagbina has the biggest share of alienable and disposable land with 234.21 square kilometres (90.43 sq mi) or about 56.51 percent of its land area followed by Hinatuan with 202.52 square kilometres (78.19 sq mi) or 63.56 percent of its land area.

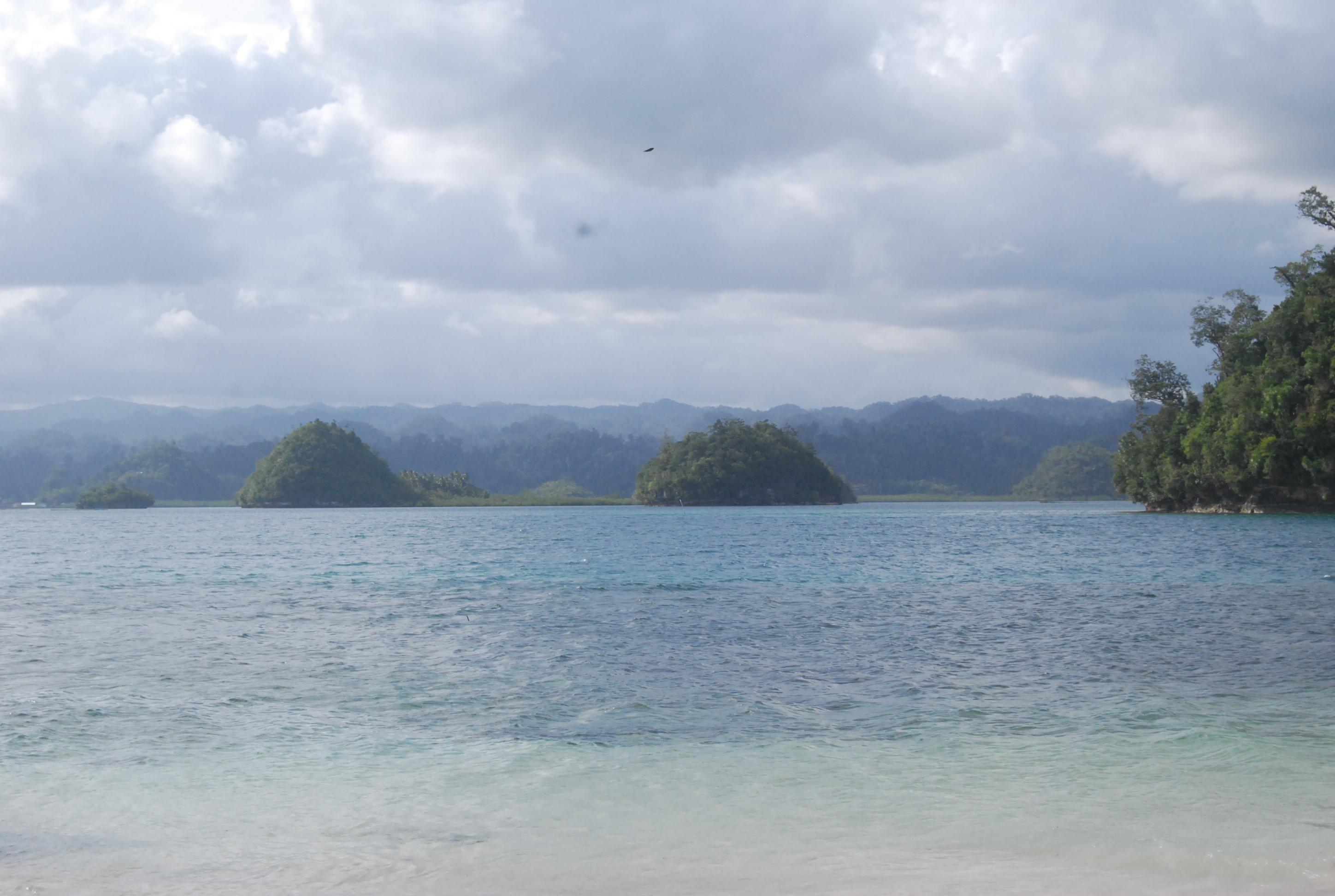
The Britania Group of Islands

Of the 3,583.523 square kilometres (1,383.606 sq mi) of forest land, 636.076 square kilometres (245.590 sq mi) are protection forest, 2,582.43 square kilometres (997.08 sq mi) production forest, 12.68 square kilometres (4.90 sq mi) are non-forest agriculture and 352.337 square kilometres (136.038 sq mi) are for non-forest mining. As of today, the province still has vast areas of remaining old growth and mossy forest.

=== Climate ===
The province falls under Type II climate of the Philippines, characterized by rainfall distributed throughout the year, although there is a distinct rainy season which begins from the month of November and ends in March. However, the climatic behavior of the province for the past few years has shown variations wherein the onset of the rainy seasons no longer occurs on the usual time. Months with low rainfall are from July to October with September as the driest month. Wet months are from November to June with January as the wettest month.

Surigao del Sur is one of the top 20 most vulnerable provinces to climate change in the Philippines.

Climate data for Surigao del Sur
Month	Jan	Feb	Mar	Apr	May	Jun	Jul	Aug	Sep	Oct	Nov	Dec	Year
Mean daily maximum °C (°F)	29.6 (85.3)	30.0 (86.0)	30.8 (87.4)	31.6 (88.9)	32.0 (89.6)	32.2 (90.0)	32.3 (90.1)	32.5 (90.5)	32.5 (90.5)	32.2 (90.0)	31.2 (88.2)	30.6 (87.1)	31.5 (88.6)
Mean daily minimum °C (°F)	23.4 (74.1)	23.2 (73.8)	23.6 (74.5)	24.2 (75.6)	24.4 (75.9)	24.3 (75.7)	24.1 (75.4)	24.3 (75.7)	24.1 (75.4)	24.0 (75.2)	23.9 (75.0)	23.7 (74.7)	23.9 (75.1)
Average rainy days	24	21	20	19	16	16	14	14	13	17	17	21	212
Source: Storm247

=== Administrative divisions ===
Surigao del Sur comprises 17 municipalities and two cities, further subdivided into 309 barangays. There are two congressional districts encompassing all cities and towns.

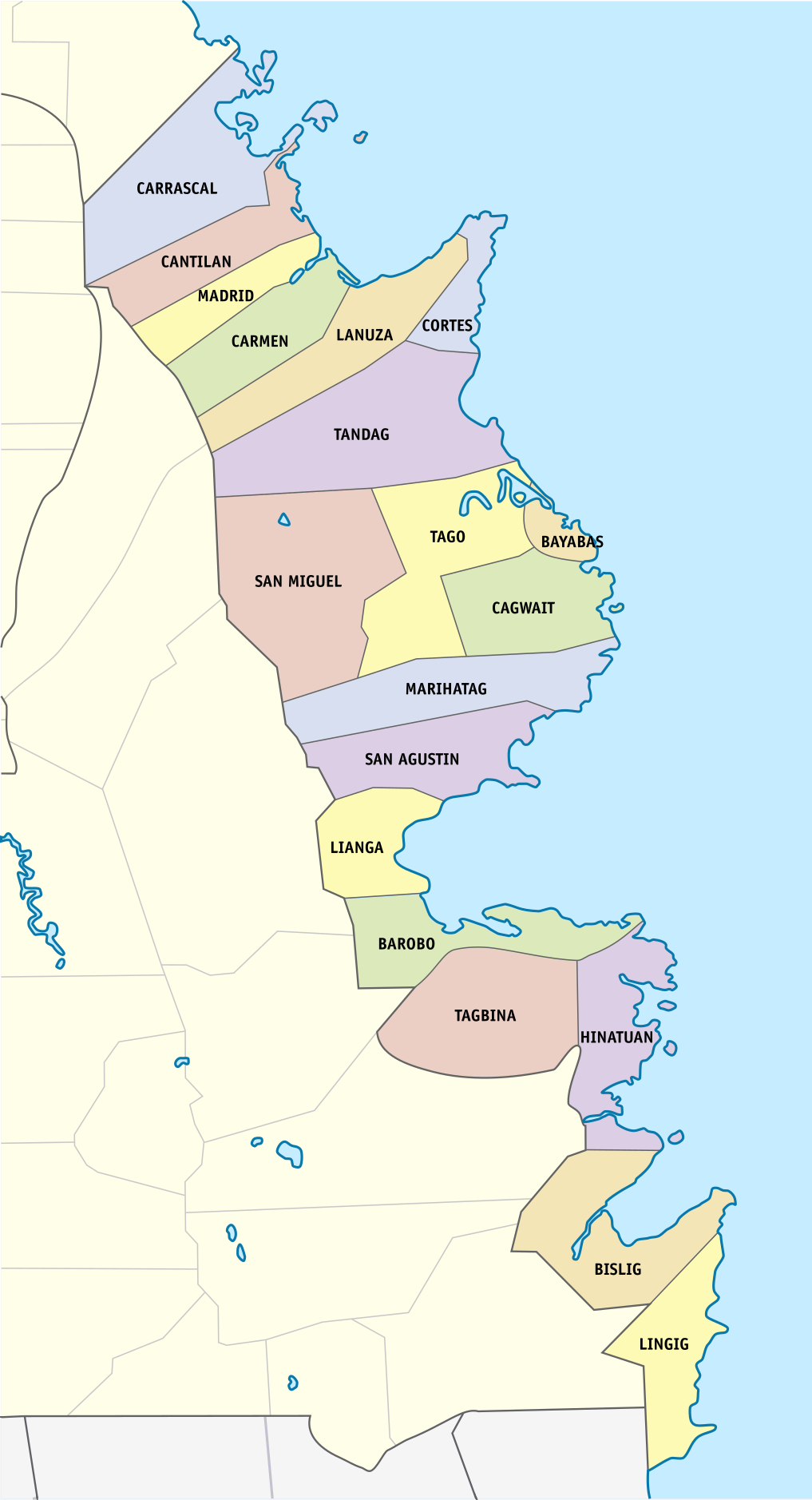
Political divisions of Surigao del Sur

- † Provincial capital and component city
- ∗ Component city
- Municipality

City or municipality^{[A]}		District	Population			±% p.a.	Area		Density		Barangay	Coordinates^{[B]}
			(2020)		(2015)		km^{2}	sq mi	/km^{2}	/sq mi		
Barobo		2nd	8.3%	53,146	49,730	+1.27%	242.50	93.63	220	570	21	8°32′11″N 126°07′14″E
Bayabas		1st	1.4%	8,979	8,164	+1.83%	117.84	45.50	76	200	7	8°58′03″N 126°16′58″E
Bislig	∗	2nd	15.5%	99,290	94,535	+0.94%	331.80	128.11	300	780	24	8°12′42″N 126°19′00″E
Cagwait		1st	3.4%	21,747	20,384	+1.24%	214.10	82.66	100	260	11	8°55′06″N 126°18′06″E
Cantilan		1st	5.3%	34,060	31,492	+1.50%	240.10	92.70	140	360	17	9°20′05″N 125°58′33″E
Carmen		1st	1.8%	11,720	10,347	+2.40%	160.01	61.78	73	190	8	9°13′43″N 126°01′00″E
Carrascal		1st	3.8%	24,586	22,479	+1.72%	265.80	102.63	92	240	14	9°22′06″N 125°56′55″E
Cortes		1st	2.8%	17,924	15,912	+2.29%	127.08	49.07	140	360	12	9°16′29″N 126°11′25″E
Hinatuan		2nd	6.8%	43,841	39,842	+1.84%	299.10	115.48	150	390	24	8°21′56″N 126°20′09″E
Lanuza		1st	2.1%	13,642	12,001	+2.47%	290.60	112.20	47	120	13	9°14′01″N 126°03′37″E
Lianga		1st	5.3%	33,869	29,493	+2.67%	161.12	62.21	210	540	13	8°37′58″N 126°05′34″E
Lingig		2nd	5.5%	35,142	31,485	+2.11%	305.17	117.83	120	310	18	8°02′15″N 126°24′44″E
Madrid		1st	2.6%	16,653	15,223	+1.72%	141.20	54.52	120	310	14	9°15′45″N 125°57′49″E
Marihatag		1st	3.0%	19,441	18,518	+0.93%	312.50	120.66	62	160	12	8°48′02″N 126°17′55″E
San Agustin		1st	3.6%	22,855	22,779	+0.06%	277.28	107.06	82	210	13	8°44′37″N 126°13′19″E
San Miguel		1st	6.5%	41,809	39,340	+1.17%	558.00	215.45	75	190	18	8°56′03″N 126°02′23″E
Tagbina		2nd	6.4%	41,051	38,833	+1.06%	343.49	132.62	120	310	25	8°27′26″N 126°09′32″E
Tago		1st	6.2%	39,831	35,329	+2.31%	253.28	97.79	160	410	24	9°01′10″N 126°13′59″E
Tandag	†	1st	9.8%	62,669	56,364	+2.04%	291.73	112.64	210	540	21	9°04′47″N 126°11′51″E
Total				642,255	592,250	+1.56%	4,932.70	1,904.53	130	340	309	(see GeoGroup box)
1. Former names are italicized.; 2. Coordinates mark the city/town center, and are sortable by latitude.

== Demographics ==
Population census of Surigao del Sur
Year	Pop.	±% p.a.
1903	42,346	—
1918	55,421	+1.81%
1939	99,981	+2.85%
1948	109,949	+1.06%
1960	165,016	+3.44%
1970	258,680	+4.59%
1975	302,305	+3.17%
1980	377,647	+4.55%
1990	452,098	+1.82%
1995	471,263	+0.78%
2000	501,808	+1.36%
2007	545,902	+1.17%
2010	561,219	+1.01%
2015	592,250	+1.03%
2020	642,255	+1.72%
2024	648,858	+0.25%
Source: Philippine Statistics Authority

The population of Surigao del Sur in the 2024 census was 648,858 people, with a density of 130 inhabitants per square kilometre or 340 inhabitants per square mile.

The province is home to the Kamayo, Agusan, and the eponymous Surigaonon peoples, with the latter ethnolingustically related to the Visayan ethnic groups (though geographically native in Mindanao). Their dances are showcased in the local festival, "Sirong Festival", held especially during the town fiesta of Cantilan. The Sirong Festival depicts the early Christianization of the early Cantilan inhabitants where the natives tried to defend their land against Visayan invaders. Other residents in the province include the migrants (and their native-born descendants) from Ilocandia, Cagayan Valley, Cordillera Administrative Region, Central Luzon, Calabarzon, Mindoro, Marinduque and Bicolandia in Luzon and Panay, Negros, Central and Western Visayas, as well as Chinese and white Europeans (eg. Spaniards and white Americans) and their native-born descendants.

The indigenous people of the province were largely Christianized during the early times of the Spanish conquest.

=== Languages ===
The Surigaonon and Tandaganon languages are spoken in most parts of Surigao del Sur (except in Bislig and the towns of Barobo, Hinatuan, Lingig and Tagbina, where most of the inhabitants speak Cebuano and their native Kamayo, a different language but one distantly related to Surigaonon, is spoken by the rest of the population), with the Cantilangnon dialect, a northern variety of Surigaonon that is very much similar to the dialect of Surigaonon as spoken in Surigao del Norte, being spoken mostly in the five northern municipalities of the province, namely Carrascal, Cantilan, Madrid, Carmen and Lanuza (or the municipal cluster called Carcanmadcarlan); these municipalities were once under a single Municipality of Cantilan before December 10, 1918.

Tagalog and English are also widely spoken throughout the province and used as the primary languages of education, business, and administration.

== Economy ==
Poverty incidence of Surigao del Sur (%)

Source: Philippine Statistics Authority

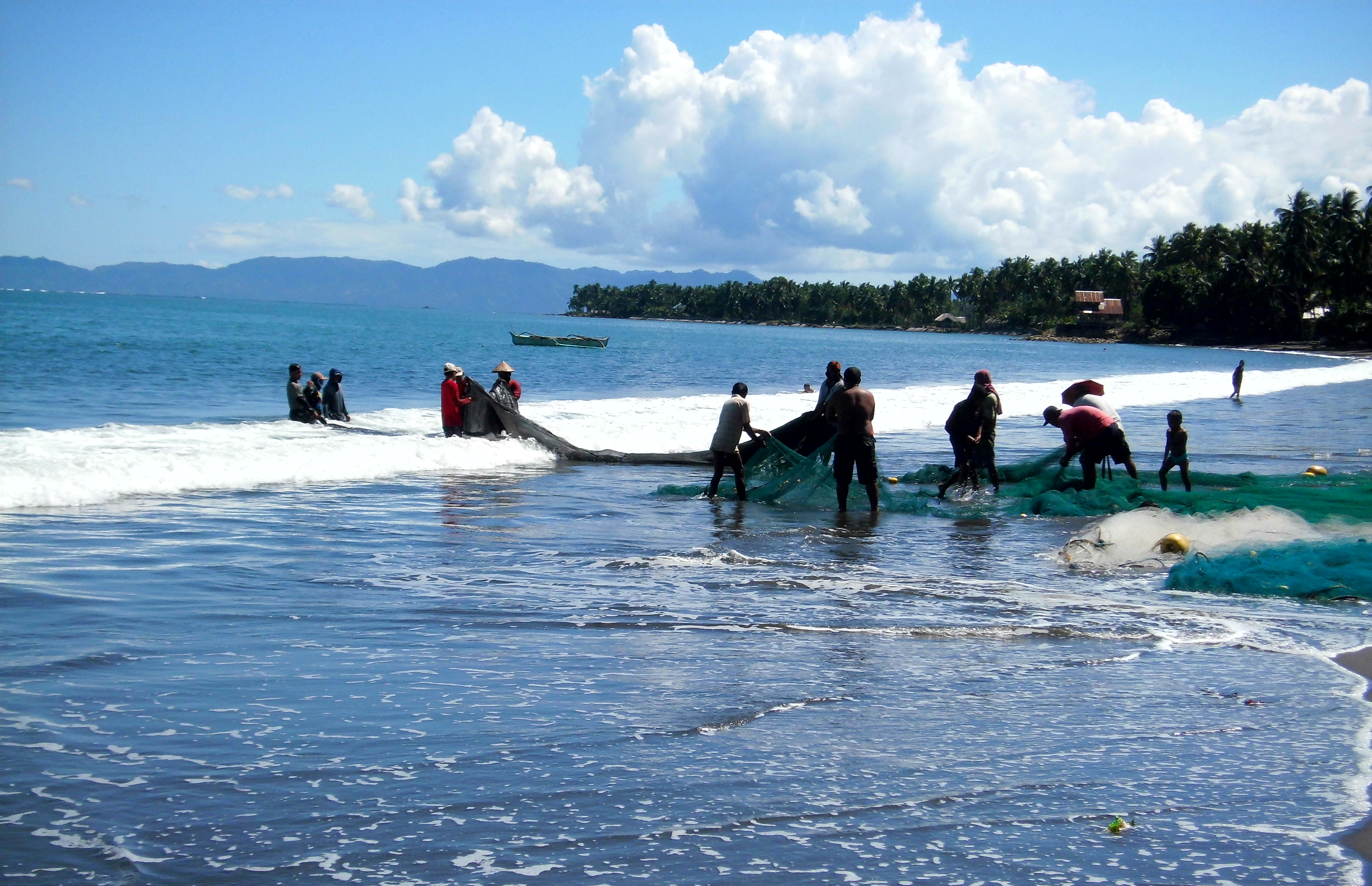
Coastal fishing in Cantilan

Surigao del Sur is one of the suppliers of rice, bananas and other tropical fruits. Copper, chromite and silver are also found here. Marine and aquaculture are abundant in the province, being primary livelihoods of the inhabitants as the province is well known for producing seafood and sea by-products.

=== Mineral resources ===
Surigao del Sur is endowed with metallic minerals such as copper, gold, chromite, cobalt, nickel and lead zinc, as well as non-metallic (limestone, coal and feldspar, clay diatomite/bentomite and coarse/fine aggregates). There are small and large scale mining activities in the province. Corporations operating in a large scale are the Marc Ventures Mining Development Corporation at Carrascal and Cantilan, operating in an area of 4,799 hectares (47.99 km^{2}) within the Diwata Mountain Range. The [TP Construction and Mining Corporation, also in Carrascal, focuses on gold and nickel mining in an area of 35.64 square kilometres (13.76 sq mi) and 48.6916 square kilometres (18.80 sq mi), respectively. The Carac-an Development Corporation, also in Carrascal, has an area of 506.3764 square kilometres (195.51 sq mi). Small scale mining activities are found in the municipalities of Barobo, Carmen and San Miguel.

== Tourism ==
Bislig's main tourist attraction is the Tinuy-an Falls, known as the little "Niagara Falls of the Philippines". It is a white water curtain that flows in three levels about 55 metres (180 ft) high and 95 metres (312 ft) wide. Its unique natural formation once appeared in the International Travel Magazine. It is also known as the widest waterfall in the Philippines.

Surfing in Surigao del Sur is widely known and has been one of the local tourist attractions. This extreme sport is often practiced in Cantilan and Lanuza. Skimboarding is also found in several municipalities, attracting tourists.

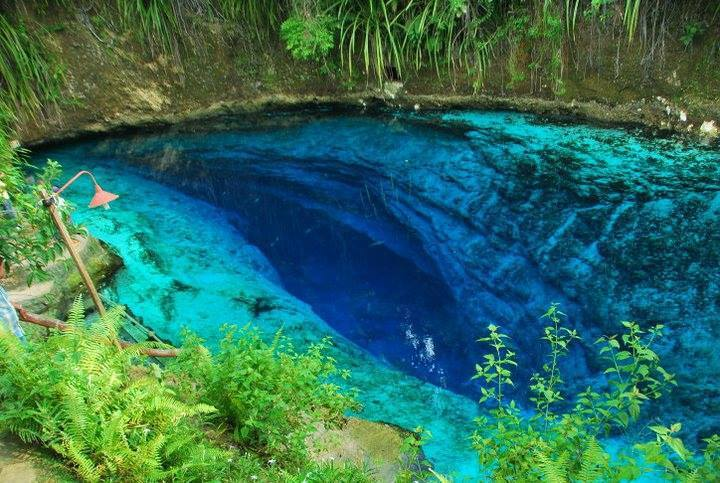
Deep-blue waters of the renowned "Hinatuan Enchanted River", an underground river in Barangay Talisay, Hinatuan

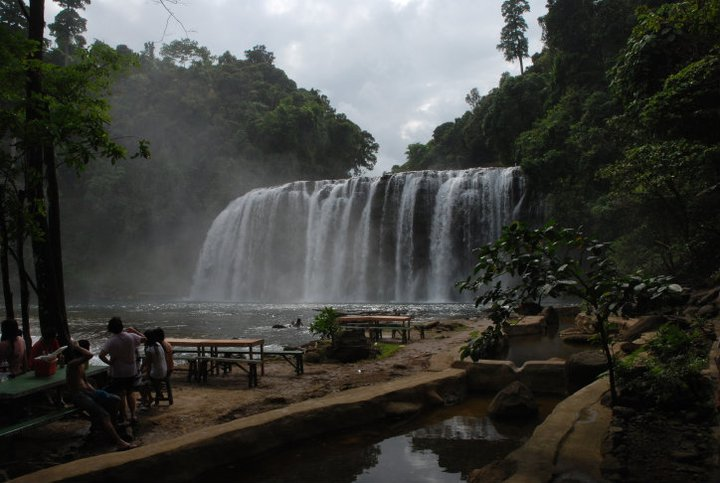
The Tinuy-an Falls in Burboanan, Bislig

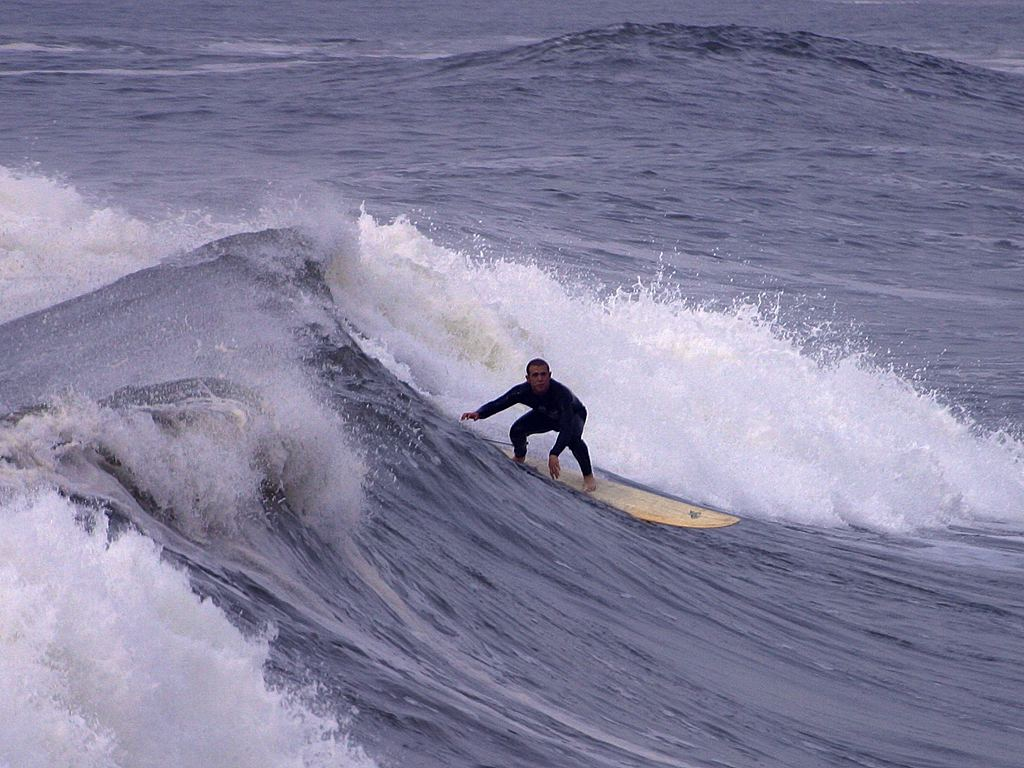
Surfing in Lanuza

== Notable people ==
- Marcelito Pomoy - singer and Pilipinas Got Talent (season 2) Grand Winner and America's Got Talent: The Champions finalist
- Gabriel Amigo III - international Enduro mountain bike racing champion
- Dennis Orcollo - professional pool player; Billiard Congress of America Hall of Fame inductee
- Elmar Sillador - 1992 Philippine National Police Medal of Valor recipient
- Prospero Arreza Pichay, Jr. (Butch Pichay) - son of Provincial Treasurer Prospero Pichay Sr. He became the Congressman of Surigao del Sur 1st district from 1998 until 2007.
- Lt. Gen. William Hotchkiss III - member of the famed Blue Diamonds, a combat ready pilot.
- Gen. Hernando Delfin Carmelo Arreza Iriberri, PMA Class "Matikas", 1983 - became the Commanding General of the Philippine Army (56th) and the 46th Chief of Staff of the Armed Forces of the Philippines.

== See also ==
- Surigao del Norte
- Dinagat Islands
