= San Agustin, Surigao del Sur =

Municipality in Surigao del Sur, Philippines

San Agustin
- Municipality
- Municipality of San Agustin
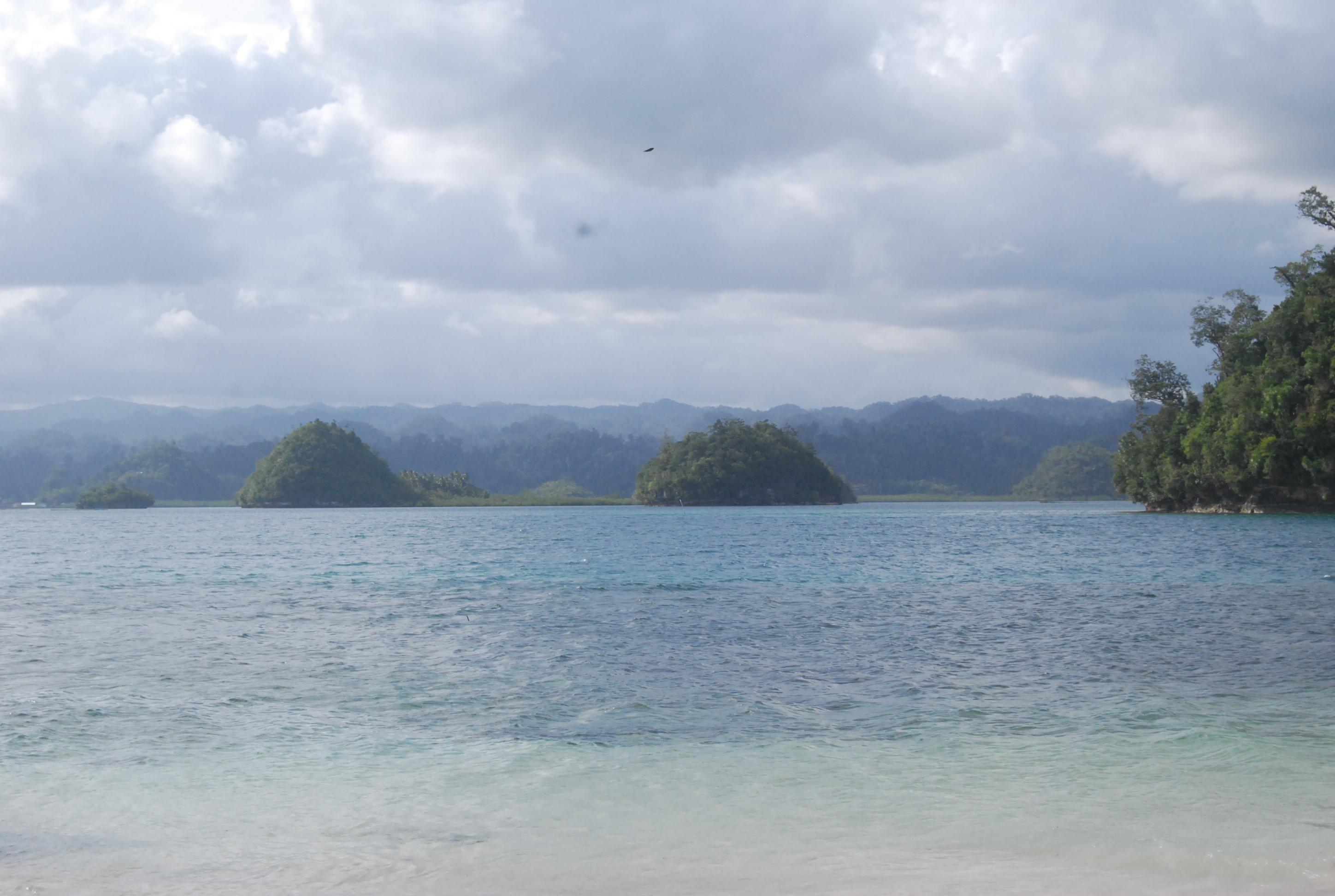
- Britania Islets at the Lianga Bay in San Agustin

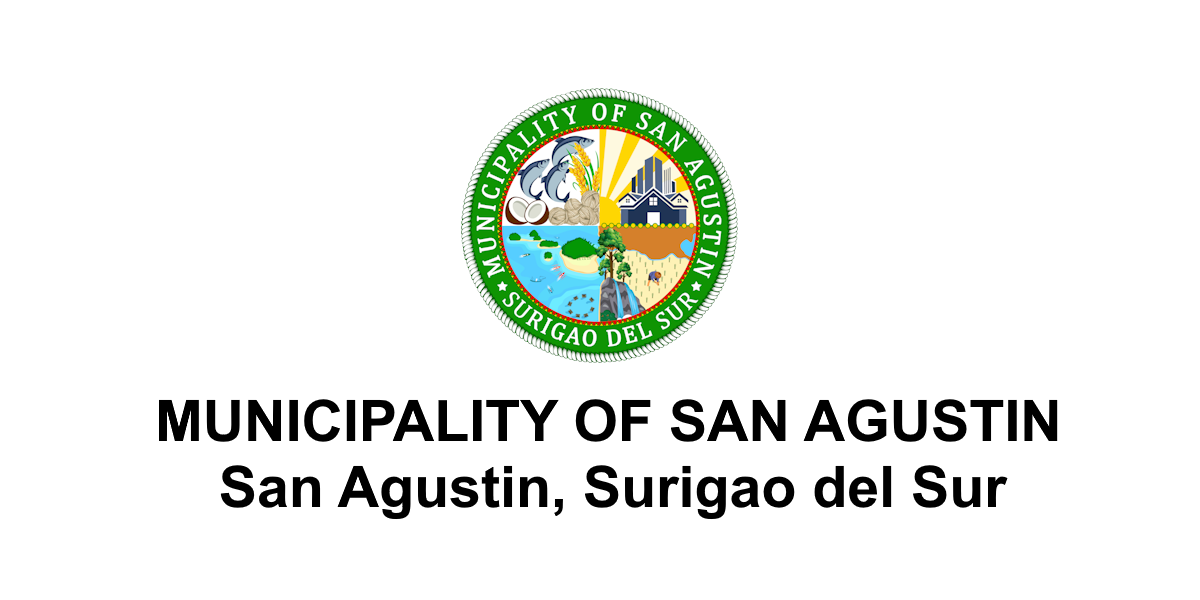
- Flag
- Nickname: Heart of Surigao del Sur
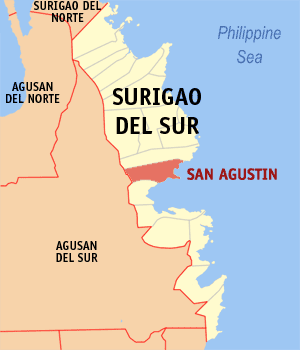
- Map of Surigao del Sur with San Agustin highlighted
- Interactive map of San Agustin
- Location within the Philippines
- Coordinates: 8°44′37″N 126°13′17″E
- Country: Philippines
- Region: Caraga
- Province: Surigao del Sur
- District: 1st district
- Barangays: 13 (see Barangays)

Government
  - Type: Sangguniang Bayan
  - Mayor: Libertad O. Alameda
  - Vice Mayor: Mamerta P. Milo
  - Representative: Romeo S. Momo Sr.
  - Electorate: 15,281 voters (2025)

Area
  - Total: 277.28 km^{2} (107.06 sq mi)
- Elevation: 35 m (115 ft)
- Highest elevation: 384 m (1,260 ft)
- Lowest elevation: 0 m (0 ft)

Population (2024 census)
  - Total: 23,612
  - Density: 85.156/km^{2} (220.55/sq mi)
  - Households: 4,964

Economy
  - Income class: 2nd municipal income class
  - Poverty incidence: 22.18% (2023)
  - Revenue: ₱ 237.6 million (2024)
  - Assets: ₱ 452.4 million (2024)
  - Expenditure: ₱ 219.1 million (2024)
  - Liabilities: ₱ 149.6 million (2024)

Service provider
  - Electricity: Surigao del Sur 2 Electric Cooperative (SURSECO 2)
- Time zone: UTC+8 (PST)
- ZIP code: 8305
- PSGC: 1606815000
- IDD : area code: +63 (0)86
- Native languages: Surigaonon; Agusan; Cebuano; Kamayo; Tagalog
- Website: www.sanagustin.info

San Agustin, officially the Municipality of San Agustin (Surigaonon: Lungsod nan San Agustin; Tagalog: Bayan ng San Agustin), is a municipality in the province of Surigao del Sur, Philippines. According to the 2024 census, it has a population of 23,612 people.

It was established as the municipality of Oteiza on June 16, 1962, by virtue of Republic Act No. 3489, from the municipality of Marihatag; it acquired its current name on June 17, 1967, by virtue of Republic Act No. 4903.

The town is famous for the Britania Group of Islands (or simply Britania Islets), a group of 24 islands with white sandbar beaches scattered across waters of the Lianga Bay, overlooking the Philippine Sea.

== Geography ==
=== Barangays ===
San Agustin is politically subdivided into 13 barangays. Each barangay consists of puroks while some have sitios.

- Britania
- Buatong
- Buhisan
- Gata
- Hornasan
- Janipaan
- Kauswagan
- Oteiza
- Poblacion
- Pong-on
- Pongtod
- Salvacion
- Santo Niño

== Demographics ==
Population census of San Agustin
Year	Pop.	±% p.a.
1970	7,100	—
1975	9,309	+5.58%
1980	10,024	+1.49%
1990	11,982	+1.80%
1995	13,768	+2.64%
2000	14,845	+1.63%
2007	19,546	+3.87%
2010	20,655	+2.03%
2015	22,779	+1.88%
2020	22,855	+0.07%
2024	23,612	+0.79%
Source: Philippine Statistics Authority

== Economy ==
Poverty incidence of San Agustin (%)

Source: Philippine Statistics Authority
