= Tagbina =

Municipality in Surigao del Sur, Philippines

- Municipality
- Municipality of Tagbina
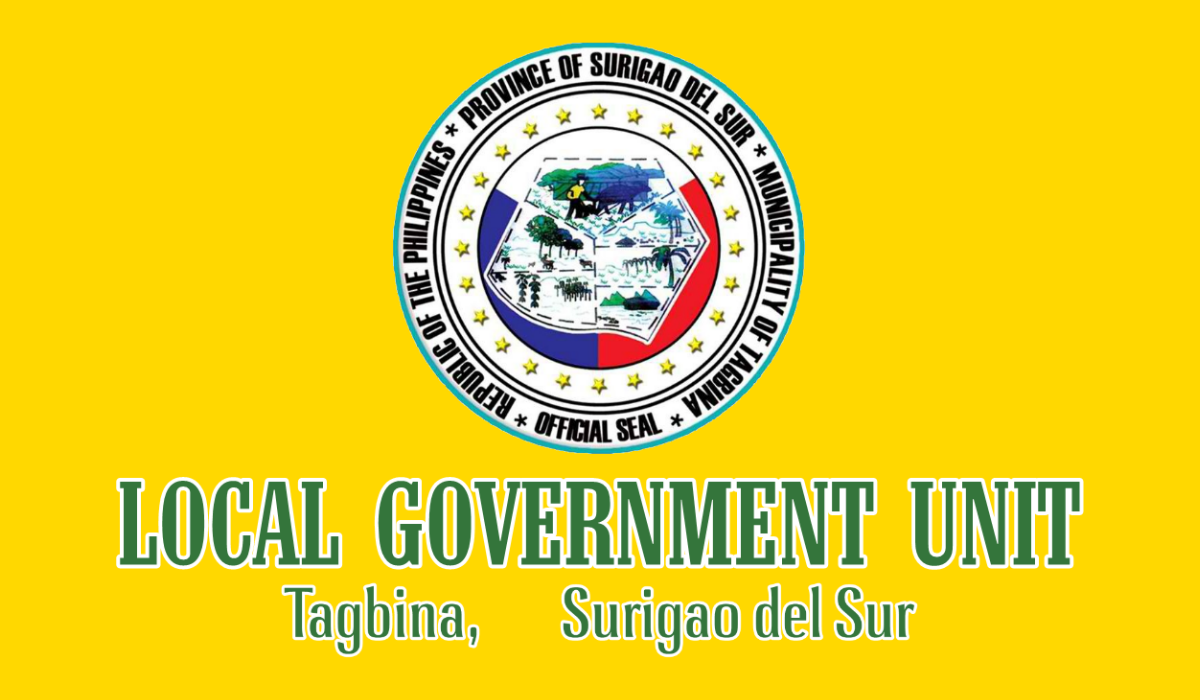
- Flag

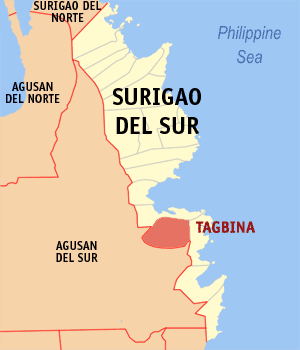
- Map of Surigao del Sur with Tagbina highlighted
- Interactive map of Tagbina
- Location within the Philippines
- Coordinates: 8°27′28″N 126°09′28″E
- Country: Philippines
- Region: Caraga
- Province: Surigao del Sur
- District: 2nd district
- Barangays: 25 (see Barangays)

Government
  - Type: Sangguniang Bayan
  - Mayor: Glazia Jane Polizon Lanete
  - Vice Mayor: Janito O. Lumakin
  - Representative: Alexander T. Pimentel
  - Electorate: 30,283 voters (2025)

Area
  - Total: 343.49 km^{2} (132.62 sq mi)
- Elevation: 44 m (144 ft)
- Highest elevation: 180 m (590 ft)
- Lowest elevation: 17 m (56 ft)

Population (2024 census)
  - Total: 41,157
  - Density: 119.82/km^{2} (310.33/sq mi)
  - Households: 9,686

Economy
  - Income class: 1st municipal income class
  - Poverty incidence: 19.17% (2023)
  - Revenue: ₱ 246.6 million (2024)
  - Assets: ₱ 465.9 million (2024)
  - Expenditure: ₱ 137 million (2024)
  - Liabilities: ₱ 168.3 million (2024)
- Time zone: UTC+8 (PST)
- ZIP code: 8308, 8319 (Malixi only)
- PSGC: 1606817000
- IDD : area code: +63 (0)86
- Native languages: Surigaonon; Agusan; Cebuano; Tagalog; Kamayo
- Website: www.tagbina.gov.ph

Tagbina, officially the Municipality of Tagbina, is a municipality in the province of Surigao del Sur, Philippines. According to the 2024 census, it has a population of 41,157 people.

It is one of the only two landlocked municipalities in the province along with San Miguel.

== Geography ==
=== Barangays ===
Tagbina is politically subdivided into 25 barangays. Each barangay consists of puroks while some have sitios.

- Batunan
- Carpenito
- Doña Carmen
- Hinagdanan
- Kahayagan
- Lago
- Maglambing
- Maglatab
- Magsaysay
- Malixi
- Manambia
- Osmeña
- Poblacion
- Quezon
- San Vicente
- Santa Cruz
- Santa Fe
- Santa Juana
- Santa Maria
- Sayon
- Soriano
- Tagongon
- Trinidad
- Ugoban
- Villaverde

=== Climate ===
Climate data for Tagbina
Month	Jan	Feb	Mar	Apr	May	Jun	Jul	Aug	Sep	Oct	Nov	Dec	Year
Mean daily maximum °C (°F)	29.0 (84.2)	29.1 (84.4)	30.0 (86.0)	30.9 (87.6)	31.6 (88.9)	31.5 (88.7)	31.6 (88.9)	31.8 (89.2)	31.8 (89.2)	31.4 (88.5)	30.6 (87.1)	29.7 (85.5)	30.8 (87.4)
Daily mean °C (°F)	25.3 (77.5)	25.4 (77.7)	25.9 (78.6)	26.6 (79.9)	27.3 (81.1)	27.1 (80.8)	27.1 (80.8)	27.2 (81.0)	27.1 (80.8)	26.9 (80.4)	26.4 (79.5)	25.8 (78.4)	26.5 (79.7)
Mean daily minimum °C (°F)	21.7 (71.1)	21.7 (71.1)	21.9 (71.4)	22.4 (72.3)	23.0 (73.4)	22.7 (72.9)	22.6 (72.7)	22.6 (72.7)	22.5 (72.5)	22.5 (72.5)	22.3 (72.1)	22.0 (71.6)	22.3 (72.2)
Average rainfall mm (inches)	653 (25.7)	489 (19.3)	412 (16.2)	309 (12.2)	272 (10.7)	237 (9.3)	210 (8.3)	201 (7.9)	216 (8.5)	223 (8.8)	321 (12.6)	548 (21.6)	4,091 (161.1)
Source: Climate-Data.org

Tagbina has a tropical rainforest climate (Af) with heavy to very heavy rainfall year-round.

== Demographics ==
Population census of Tagbina
Year	Pop.	±% p.a.
1970	13,040	—
1975	20,204	+9.18%
1980	22,572	+2.24%
1990	28,976	+2.53%
1995	32,295	+2.05%
2000	34,057	+1.15%
2007	36,595	+1.00%
2010	34,812	−1.80%
2015	38,833	+2.10%
2020	41,051	+1.18%
2024	41,157	+0.06%
Source: Philippine Statistics Authority

Tourism & Economy

Tagbina is a major robusta coffee producer in the province. It also home to Libuacan Cold Spring a natural blueish green water lagoon.
