= Marihatag =

Municipality in Surigao del Sur, Philippines

Marihatag Oteiza
- Municipality
- Municipality of Marihatag
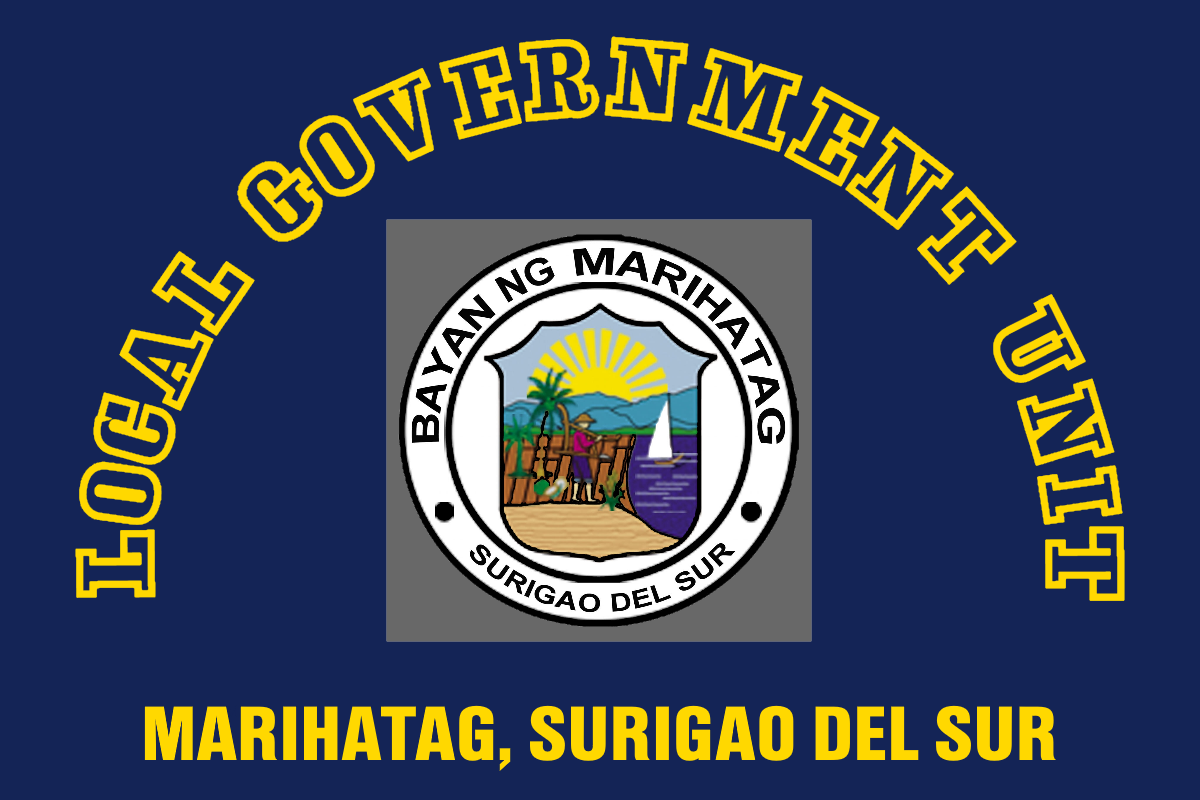
- Flag

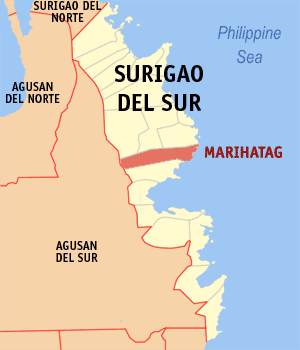
- Map of Surigao del Sur with Marihatag highlighted
- Interactive map of Marihatag
- Location within the Philippines
- Coordinates: 8°48′03″N 126°17′54″E
- Country: Philippines
- Region: Caraga
- Province: Surigao del Sur
- District: 1st district
- Barangays: 12 (see Barangays)

Government
  - Type: Sangguniang Bayan
  - Mayor: Benjamin T. Fazon Jr.
  - Vice Mayor: Charlito R. Lerog
  - Representative: Romeo S. Momo Sr.
  - Electorate: 15,490 voters (2025)

Area
  - Total: 312.50 km^{2} (120.66 sq mi)
- Elevation: 20 m (66 ft)
- Highest elevation: 261 m (856 ft)
- Lowest elevation: 0 m (0 ft)

Population (2024 census)
  - Total: 19,730
  - Density: 63.14/km^{2} (163.5/sq mi)
  - Households: 4,411

Economy
  - Income class: 2nd municipal income class
  - Poverty incidence: 25.81% (2023)
  - Revenue: ₱ 188.7 million (2024)
  - Assets: ₱ 422.9 million (2024)
  - Expenditure: ₱ 93.79 million (2024)
  - Liabilities: ₱ 200.4 million (2024)

Service provider
  - Electricity: Surigao del Sur 2 Electric Cooperative (SURSECO 2)
- Time zone: UTC+8 (PST)
- ZIP code: 8306
- PSGC: 1606814000
- IDD : area code: +63 (0)86
- Native languages: Surigaonon; Agusan; Cebuano; Kamayo; Tagalog
- Website: www.marihatag.gov.ph

Marihatag, officially the Municipality of Marihatag (Surigaonon: Lungsod nan Marihatag; Tagalog: Bayan ng Marihatag); (Indonesian: Kotamadya Marihatag), is a municipality in the province of Surigao del Sur, Philippines. According to the 2024 census, it has a population of 19,730 people.

It was known as Oteiza until 1955.

The municipality hosts the "Balik-Marihatag" Festival which literally means going back home to Marihatag.

== Etymology ==
Its name is a concatenation of Maria Ihatag.

== Geography ==
=== Barangays ===
Marihatag is politically subdivided into 12 barangays. Each barangay consists of puroks while some have sitios.

- Alegria
- Amontay
- Antipolo
- Arorogan
- Bayan (formerly Hinogbakan)
- Mahaba
- Mararag
- Poblacion
- San Antonio
- San Isidro
- San Pedro
- Sta Cruz

=== Climate ===
Climate data for Marihatag
Month	Jan	Feb	Mar	Apr	May	Jun	Jul	Aug	Sep	Oct	Nov	Dec	Year
Mean daily maximum °C (°F)	29.0 (84.2)	29.1 (84.4)	30.0 (86.0)	30.9 (87.6)	31.7 (89.1)	31.7 (89.1)	31.7 (89.1)	32.0 (89.6)	32.0 (89.6)	31.5 (88.7)	30.6 (87.1)	29.7 (85.5)	30.8 (87.5)
Daily mean °C (°F)	25.5 (77.9)	25.6 (78.1)	26.2 (79.2)	26.8 (80.2)	27.5 (81.5)	27.4 (81.3)	27.4 (81.3)	27.6 (81.7)	27.5 (81.5)	27.2 (81.0)	26.6 (79.9)	26.1 (79.0)	26.8 (80.2)
Mean daily minimum °C (°F)	22.1 (71.8)	22.1 (71.8)	22.4 (72.3)	22.8 (73.0)	23.4 (74.1)	23.2 (73.8)	23.1 (73.6)	23.2 (73.8)	23.0 (73.4)	23.0 (73.4)	22.7 (72.9)	22.5 (72.5)	22.8 (73.0)
Average rainfall mm (inches)	700 (27.6)	579 (22.8)	435 (17.1)	316 (12.4)	267 (10.5)	193 (7.6)	198 (7.8)	165 (6.5)	180 (7.1)	208 (8.2)	424 (16.7)	604 (23.8)	4,269 (168.1)
Source: Climate-Data.org

Marihatag has a tropical rainforest climate (Af) with heavy to very heavy rainfall year-round and with extremely heavy rainfall in January.

== Demographics ==
Population census of Marihatag
Year	Pop.	±% p.a.
1960	12,391	—
1970	7,254	−5.21%
1975	9,636	+5.86%
1980	10,779	+2.27%
1990	10,663	−0.11%
1995	13,254	+4.16%
2000	16,394	+4.66%
2007	17,622	+1.00%
2010	17,926	+0.62%
2015	18,518	+0.62%
2020	19,441	+1.03%
2024	19,730	+0.35%
Source: Philippine Statistics Authority

== Economy ==
Poverty incidence of Marihatag (%)

Source: Philippine Statistics Authority

== See also ==
- List of renamed cities and municipalities in the Philippines
