= Tropical Storm Penha =

Pacific tropical storm in 2026

Tropical Storm Penha (Basyang)
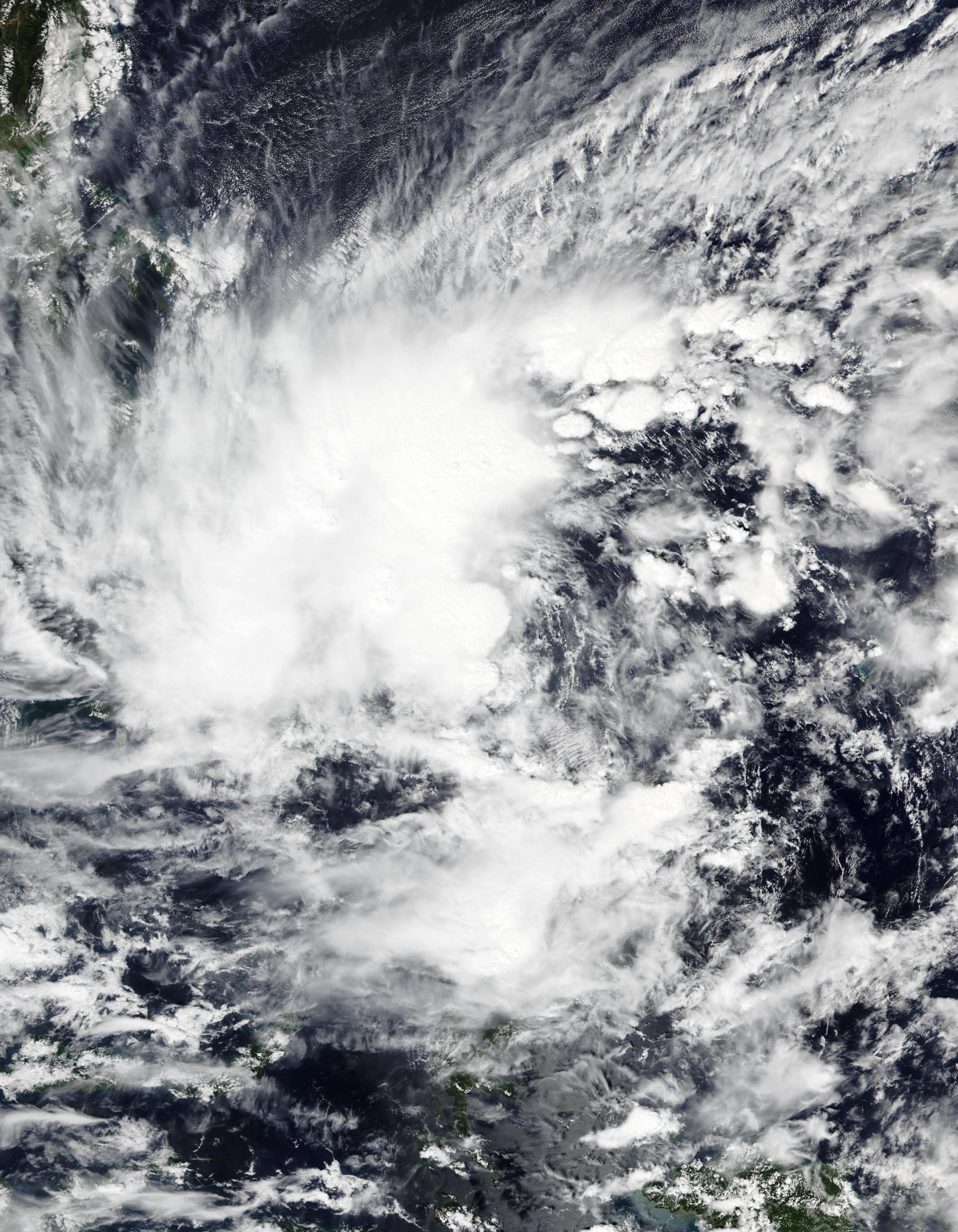
- Penha nearing landfall in the Philippines near peak intensity on February 5

Meteorological history
- Formed: February 3, 2026
- Remnant low: February 7, 2026
- Dissipated: February 7, 2026

Tropical storm
- 10-minute sustained (JMA)
- Highest winds: 65 km/h (40 mph)
- Lowest pressure: 1002 hPa (mbar); 29.59 inHg

Tropical storm
- 1-minute sustained (SSHWS/JTWC)
- Highest winds: 75 km/h (45 mph)
- Lowest pressure: 999 hPa (mbar); 29.50 inHg

Overall effects
- Fatalities: 12 total
- Injuries: 36 reported
- Damage: $25.5 million (2026 USD)
- Areas affected: Philippines
- Part of the 2026 Pacific typhoon season

Tropical Storm Penha, (Note: The name Penha (Portuguese: penha, [ˈpɐ.ɲɐ]) was contributed by Macau and refers to Penha Hill and Our Lady of Penha Chapel.) locally named Basyang, (Note: The Japan Meteorological Agency (JMA) assigns names to typhoons in the western Pacific Ocean and north of the equator, as the Regional Specialized Meteorological Centre. PAGASA assigns local names to tropical cyclones in the Philippine Area of Responsibility.) was a weak but costly early-season tropical cyclone that affected the Philippine islands of Luzon, Visayas, and Mindanao in early February 2026. It was the second named storm of the 2026 Pacific typhoon season and the first tropical cyclone to form in the month of February since Tropical Storm Dujuan in 2021.

The storm originated from a low-pressure area that formed east-northeast of Yap. The system was classified as a tropical depression by the Japan Meteorological Agency (JMA) on February 3, while the Philippine Atmospheric, Geophysical, and Astronomical Services Administration (PAGASA) assigned the local name Basyang. On February 4, the Joint Typhoon Warning Center (JTWC) designated it as Tropical Depression 02W. Later that day at 21:00 JST (12:00 UTC), the JMA upgraded the depression to a tropical storm and named it Penha, the replacement for Vongfong after it was retired following the 2020 season. The JTWC upgraded the system to tropical storm status the following day. Late on February 5, Penha made landfall over Bayabas, Surigao del Sur, and weakened into a tropical depression several hours later on February 6. The system subsequently made four consecutive landfalls across Central Visayas before degenerating into a remnant low, until it dissipated on February 7.

Four people, including two children, were killed in a landslide overnight in Cagayan de Oro. Another fatality was reported in Iligan, where a local broadcaster died of cardiac arrest after floodwaters inundated her apartment. Economic losses in Surigao del Sur were estimated at ₱1.48 billion (US$25.24 million), prompting the province to be placed under a state of calamity. A total of 1,373 homes were damaged, and 36 people were injured in Northern Mindanao.

== Meteorological history ==
Map plotting the storm's track and intensity, according to the Saffir–Simpson scale Map key Saffir–Simpson scale Tropical depression (≤38 mph, ≤62 km/h) Tropical storm (39–73 mph, 63–118 km/h) Category 1 (74–95 mph, 119–153 km/h) Category 2 (96–110 mph, 154–177 km/h) Category 3 (111–129 mph, 178–208 km/h) Category 4 (130–156 mph, 209–251 km/h) Category 5 (≥157 mph, ≥252 km/h) Unknown Storm type Tropical cyclone Subtropical cyclone Extratropical cyclone, remnant low, tropical disturbance, or monsoon depression

A low-pressure area was first identified by the JMA on February 2. At 12:00 UTC on February 3, the agency upgraded the system to a tropical depression while it was moving west-northwestward along the southern periphery of a subtropical high. It also noted that environmental conditions were favorable for further development, citing high sea surface temperatures, abundant tropical cyclone heat potential, weak vertical wind shear, and good outflow. At 17:30 PHT (09:30 UTC) the same day, the system entered the Philippine Area of Responsibility (PAR), prompting PAGASA to assign it the name Basyang. Two hours after the JMA's upgrade, the JTWC issued a Tropical Cyclone Formation Alert, noting that the elongated low-level circulation center (LLCC) showed flaring but fragmented convection and had potential for further organization.

At 03:00 UTC on February 4, the JTWC issued its first warning on the newly upgraded tropical depression, designating it as 02W. Satellite imagery depicted a partially exposed yet well-defined LLCC, displaced south of flaring convection. Although gradual consolidation was underway, the system remained highly asymmetric and disorganized, lacking organized banding features as deep convection stayed displaced from the center. At 18:00 UTC, the JMA upgraded the system to a tropical storm and assigned the name Penha; PAGASA followed shortly thereafter. A subsequent microwave pass revealed a broad but well-defined circulation as the system tracked westward through marginally favorable environmental conditions. However, increasing shear displaced convection into the northwestern quadrant, leaving the LLCC heavily exposed.

On the following day, February 5, the JTWC upgraded Penha to a tropical storm as it slowly consolidated. The system exhibited improved vertical alignment over warm sea surface temperatures, despite moderate vertical wind shear, with poleward outflow supporting its structure. However, due to limited organization, the JMA noted that the storm maintained its intensity while active convective cloud clusters remained separated, inhibiting further intensification. The JTWC later reported fragmented low-level cloud bands wrapping beneath flaring convection as the system underwent gradual consolidation. By 15:00 UTC, Penha's LLCC had become obscured under unfavorable vertical wind shear, followed by a deteriorating circulation accompanied by rapidly warming cloud-top temperatures. The storm moved west-northwestward within a generally neutral environment for intensification. At 23:50 PHT (15:50 UTC), Penha made its first landfall over Bayabas, Surigao del Sur.

On February 6, the JTWC downgraded Penha to a tropical depression as it rapidly lost convective structure amid cooling sea surface temperatures and high vertical wind shear. PAGASA followed suit at 11:00 PHT (03:00 UTC), as the system made its second landfall over Jagna, Bohol. At 06:00 UTC, in its final advisory on the system, the JMA also downgraded Penha to a tropical depression due to an unfavorable environment and land interaction. The system subsequently made a third landfall over Dauis, also in Bohol, at 16:00 PHT (08:00 UTC). After landfall, the JTWC reported that the system's LLCC had become disorganized, with its vertical structure tilting under marginally unfavorable conditions. Penha then made two additional landfalls: a fourth over Alcoy, Cebu at 19:50 PHT (11:50 UTC), and a fifth and final landfall over Ayungon, Negros Oriental at 21:00 PHT (13:00 UTC). Afterwards, the system became increasingly disorganized, with a broad LLCC and weakening surface intensities while tracking northwestward. On February 7, at 02:00 PHT (18:00 UTC on the previous day), PAGASA downgraded Penha to a remnant low, before it was confirmed to have dissipated at 08:00 PHT (00:00 UTC).

== Preparations ==
=== Highest Tropical Cyclone Wind Signal ===
TCWS#	Luzon	Visayas	Mindanao
2	None	Bohol, Negros Oriental, Siquijor, Southern Leyte, and southern portions of Cebu, Leyte, and Negros Occidental	Agusan del Norte, Agusan del Sur, Boston, Davao Oriental, (Note: The municipality of Boston was referred as the extreme northern portion of Davao Oriental.) Bucas Grande Island, Camiguin, Iligan, (Note: Iligan was referred as the northeastern portion of Lanao del Norte.) Misamis Oriental, Siargao Island, Surigao del Norte, Surigao del Sur, northern portion of Bukidnon, northeastern and eastern portions of Misamis Occidental, and southern portion of Dinagat Islands
1	Cagayancillo Island, Calamian Islands, Cuyo Islands, Romblon, northern portion of Palawan, and southern portions of Masbate, Occidental Mindoro, and Oriental Mindoro	rest of Cebu, Leyte, and Negros Occidental, Aklan, Antique, Biliran, Capiz, Guimaras, Iloilo, central and southern portions of Eastern Samar, and southern portion of Samar	rest of Bukidnon, Dinagat Islands, and Misamis Occidental, Davao City, (Note: Davao City was referred as the northern portion of Davao del Sur.)Davao de Oro, Davao del Norte, Lanao del Norte, Lanao del Sur, northern portions of Cotabato, Davao Oriental, Maguindanao del Norte, Maguindanao del Sur, and Zamboanga Sibugay, and northern and central portions of Zamboanga del Sur, and eastern portion of Zamboanga del Norte

=== Other preparations ===
On February 4, Mayor of Bacolod Greg Gasataya ordered the suspension of classes due to adverse weather conditions cause by the storm, as well as 17 local government units (LGUs) in Negros Occidental. The local governments of San Fernando, Bukidnon and Valencia likewise suspended classes while under blue alert status. In Marawi on February 5, the Provincial Disaster Risk Reduction and Management (PDRRM) of Lanao del Sur proposed precautionary measures for activities around Lake Lanao and other coastal areas. Government offices and classes in Marawi, Amai Manabilang, Lumba-Bayabao, Mulondo, and Saguiaran were suspended during February 5–6 due to the storm. Mayor of Cebu City Nestor Archival Sr. placed the city under blue alert status and suspended classes in Carmen, Compostela, Cordova, Catmon, Sogod, and Daanbantayan, all in Cebu. Free bus rides were also provided in the city to alleviate transport disruptions, particularly around Colon Street. The Philippine Coast Guard temporarily suspended voyages of vessels and watercraft plying routes from Oriental Mindoro to Aklan. A total of 23,419 ready-to-eat food items and 14,877 non-food items were prepositioned at various ports in Iloilo, Aklan, and Antique, alongside a standby fund amounting to ₱3 million (US$51,297.84) for immediate use. Mayor of Cagayan de Oro Rolando Uy ordered the suspension of work in local government offices from February 5 to 6. On February 6, the Provincial Disaster Risk Reduction and Management Office (PDRRMO) of Antique deployed a response team to Anini-y, while major highways in the province, particularly in Patnongon, were placed under monitoring.

On February 3, the National Disaster Risk Reduction and Management Council (NDRRMC) Operations Center raised its blue alert status as the storm approached the Philippines. On the following day, the Department of Social Welfare and Development (DSWD) likewise activated its blue alert status and prepositioned 3.5 million food packs across its regional hubs nationwide. In addition, a ₱3.04 billion (US$51.56 million) Quick Response Fund (QRF) was readied to support relief and early recovery operations during the storm. On February 5, the Philippine National Police (PNP), along with its regional and local units, carried out preemptive evacuations and other precautionary measures in affected areas, particularly those considered high-risk. The next day, the Department of Interior and Local Government (DILG) coordinated with LGUs and advised provincial and municipal governments to temporarily close roads in flood- and landslide-prone areas until conditions were declared safe.

== Impact ==
Several villages were inundated and roads rendered impassable in the municipalities of Cantilan, Madrid, Lanuza, Cortes, San Miguel, Bayabas, and Carmen in Surigao del Sur. The Provincial Disaster Risk Reduction and Management Office (PDRRMO) reported infrastructure damage amounting to ₱876.9 million (US$14.98 million) and agricultural losses of ₱599.36 million (US$10.26 million), bringing the total estimated economic losses in Surigao del Sur to ₱1.48 billion (US$25.24 million). The province was subsequently placed under a state of calamity. Authorities also confirmed the deaths of a child buried by a landslide in Cortes and a woman who was swept away by floodwaters in Carmen. Meanwhile, the local governments of Cabadbaran, Agusan del Norte, and Mainit, Surigao del Norte, provided a combined ₱875,827 (US$15,051.20) worth of assistance to residents and evacuees affected by flooding. A state of calamity was also declared in Iligan City, with reports of a year-old steel bridge that collapsed in Barangay Puga-an, and three people dead due to flooding. A family of four was killed by a landslide in Cagayan de Oro.

In total, 182,352 families were affected by the storm. A total of 1,203 houses sustained partial damage, while 170 were completely destroyed. In Northern Mindanao alone, 36 injuries were reported. DSWD distributed ₱27 million (US$461,775.33) worth of humanitarian assistance to families affected by Penha. A landslide was reported in Balamban, while a river overflowed in Cebu City near the Lusaran Dam. Several motorbancas were damaged by large waves in Caubian Island, Lapu-Lapu City. In Gingoog, three rivers swelled while the city was under red alert status. The Panul-Iran Bridge, which connects Iligan and Marawi, collapsed after being swept away by strong currents in the Iligan River. A ₱4.39 billion (US$76.39 million) budget by the Presidential Communications Office (PCO) was allocated for relief operations to the storm-affected areas.

== See also ==
- Weather of 2026
- Tropical cyclones in 2026
- Tropical Storm Washi (2011; Sendong) – a slightly stronger and more destructive system which also severely affected Northern Mindanao
- Tropical Storm Kajiki (2014; Basyang) - a tropical storm with the same Philippine name that has the same wind speed and pressure as Penha, affected the same areas and had a very similar track.
- Tropical Storm Bolaven (2018; Agaton) – an early-season tropical storm that persisted from 2017, which made landfall in both Caraga and Central Visayas
- Tropical Storm Sanba (2018; Basyang) – a tropical storm which also has a same Philippine name that affected the same areas as Penha
- Typhoon Koto (2025; Verbena) – a moderately strong tropical cyclone which made landfall in almost the same areas as Penha
