= Prospero Pichay Jr. =

Filipino politician

The Honourable Prospero Pichay Jr.
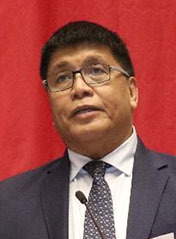
- Pichay in 2019

Deputy Speaker of the Philippine House of Representatives
- In office July 22, 2019 – June 1, 2022
- House Speaker: Alan Peter Cayetano; Lord Allan Velasco
- In office August 15, 2018 – June 4, 2019
- House Speaker: Gloria Macapagal Arroyo
- Preceded by: Miro Quimbo

Member of the Philippine House of Representatives from Surigao del Sur's 1st district
- In office June 30, 2016 – June 30, 2022
- Preceded by: Mary Elizabeth Delgado-Ty
- Succeeded by: Romeo S. Momo
- In office June 30, 1998 – June 30, 2007
- Preceded by: Mario S. Ty
- Succeeded by: Philip A. Pichay

Personal details
- Born: Prospero Arreza Pichay Jr. June 20, 1950 (age 76) Cantilan, Surigao, Philippines
- Party: Lakas
- Spouse: Maria Carla L. Lopez
- Education: De La Salle University (Bcom)

Prospero Arreza Pichay Jr. (Tagalog pronunciation: [ˌpɾoːs.pɛˈɾo pɪˈt͡ʃaɪ̯], born June 20, 1950), also known as Butch Pichay, is a Filipino politician who served as Representative of Surigao del Sur's 1st district in the Philippine House of Representatives from 1998 to 2007 and from 2016 to 2022. He was the chairman of the House Committee on National Defense in the 13th Congress and deputy speaker in the 17th and 18th Congresses. He is a member of the formerly dominant political party Kabalikat ng Malayang Pilipino and was a senatorial aspirant in the 2007 Philippine Senate election but lost.

== Early life and education ==
Pichay was born on June 20, 1950, in the town of Cantilan in the then-province of Surigao (now Surigao del Sur). He is the son of former Carmen, Surigao del Sur Provincial Treasurer Prospero Pichay Sr. He is the brother of Philip Pichay, a former congressman and mayor of Cantilan. He is also a relative of Wenceslao Arreza, former mayor of Carmen, Surigao del Sur; Alfred Arreza, former mayor of Carrascal, Surigao del Sur; and Carmeling Pichay-Crisologo, former governor of Ilocos Sur whose husband is former Ilocos Sur Representative Floro Crisologo.

Pichay went to Tandag Central Elementary School and graduated in 1962. He went to Saint Peter's Seminary of Surigao and graduated in 1966. He graduated Bachelor of Science in Commerce at De La Salle University in Manila in 1970.

== Career ==
Pichay is the owner of Carlo Commercial Publishing, a printing press, and Carlo Publishing, the makers of hit street tabloid "Remate". He also owns DZME a commercial AM radio station in Roosevelt Avenue in Quezon City.

=== Political career ===
==== Congressman (1998-2007) ====
Pichay ran for congressman for the 1st District of Surigao del Sur in the 1998 elections and won.

In 2000, Pichay joined fellow congressmen who endorsed the verified complaint against President Joseph Estrada. Coming under the heels of EDSA 2, Congress was reorganized and Pichay was elected Chairman of the House Committee on National Defense. He was again named to the same post when his constituents overwhelmingly voted him into office in the elections for the 12th Congress.

Pichay was re-elected as congressman in the 2004 elections. When the 13th Congress was organized, Pichay's political career would take on a more prominent course: he was named Head of the House of Representatives Contingent to the powerful Commission on Appointments (CA).

Pichay voted to junk the 2005 and 2006 impeachment complaints against President Gloria Macapagal Arroyo. At the height of the "Hello Garci Scandal", he said there was nothing wrong with Arroyo talking to Commission on Elections officials, as all candidates talk to them to protect their votes. In October 2006, Pichay authored House Resolution 1285, which sought to convene a constituent assembly to amend the 1987 Constitution. One of his proposals is the abolition of the Philippine Senate and the creation of a unicameral parliament. The resolution was widely opposed by civil society and church groups and the resolution was shelved on the same month.

When the Department of Justice announced a plan to ban all government officials from going to bars, karaoke joints and other nightspots, Pichay assailed the move as the "highest form of hypocrisy." Pichay believed there was nothing wrong with going to bars if public officials do it on their own time, saying “Moralizing is very subjective. We should not mix it with governance."

During his time as congressman, Pichay contributed to the following laws:

- RA 9355 - Act Creating the province of Dinagat Islands
- RA 9340 - Amending RA 9164 to extend the terms of office of barangay officials and reset the date of barangay elections
- RA 9344 - Juvenile Justice and Welfare Act

==== Senatorial bid ====
Pichay ran for senator in 2007 under TEAM Unity but lost after placing 16th in the overall results. He reportedly spent P127.39 million for campaign ads, the highest candidate expenditure for that election.

==== Local Waterworks and Utilities Administration ====
Following his defeat, it was rumored that Pichay would be appointed by President Arroyo as head of the Overseas Workers Welfare Administration. It was later reported that he would be appointed as a member of the board and chair of the Local Waterworks and Utilities Administration (LWUA). On August 28, 2008, Pichay announced that he will not accept his appointment as board member of the LWUA, for he is satisfied with his current job in a private company. However, on September 4, he changed his mind and accepted his appointment. Eduardo Ermita announced that Pichay has decided to accept his appointment as board member with a nomination to be elected as chair.

In September 2010, an employees' group of the LWUA filed a plunder complaint against Pichay before the Office of the Ombudsman for allegedly using the agency's money for his personal interest. The complaints stemmed from LWUA's ₱780-million investment in the Express Savings Bank, Inc.

In April 2011, during the administration of President Benigno Aquino III, criminal and administrative charges were filed against Pichay and other LWUA officials for their "highly irregular" and "anomalous" acquisition of a controlling stake at Express Savings Bank, Inc., a thrift bank in Cabuyao, Laguna, owned by the Gatchalian family which suffered losses of up to ₱27.87 million from 2005 to 2009.

On July 4, 2011, the Ombudsman ordered the dismissal of Pichay and two other officials for grave misconduct in connection to the 2009 acquisition of Express Savings Bank, Inc. by LWUA. They were stripped of all benefits and were permanently disqualified from working in government. Pichay responded by saying his dismissal was "political harassment" and accused the Aquino administration of getting back at him for his staunch support for the previous Arroyo administration. He appealed to the Court of Appeals in October 2011 but his dismissal was upheld in November 2013. He then appealed to the Supreme Court whose first division in November 2021 found no merit to reverse the previous decisions of the Ombudsman and the Court of Appeals.

==== Congressman (2016–22) ====
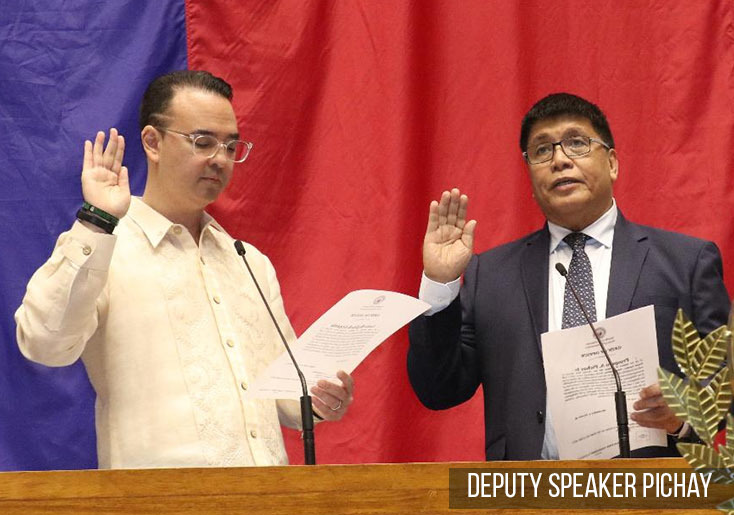
Pichay taking his oath of office as Deputy House Speaker on July 27, 2019

Pichay ran for Congress in the 2016 Philippine general election to regain his seat from neophyte congresswoman Mary Elizabeth Ty-Delgado who was not seeking reelection. He won the election, receiving 90,843 votes.

On July 13, 2016, a petition was filed before the House of Representatives Electoral Tribunal against Pichay by his opponent in the election, Gregorio Murillo Jr. Murillo stated that Pichay was ineligible to run for public office since the July 2011 decision of the Ombudsman disqualified him from working in government. The petition was later dismissed for lack of merit due to Pichay's then-pending appeal in the Supreme Court.

In October 2016, Pichay filed an ethics complaint against Surigao del Norte 2nd District Representative Ace Barbers following a confrontation between the two during a hearing of the House Committee on Constitutional Amendments. The two got into a heated argument during discussions on whether the panel should vote on recommending a Constituent Assembly or a Constitutional Commission to amend the 1987 Constitution. The two congressmen previously had a squabble back in 2005 when Pichay moved to "kick out" Barbers from the Lakas–CMD party of then-President Arroyo following the latter's backing of the impeachment complaint against the President.

In December 2016, Indigenous Manobo and Mamanwa communities sued Pichay before the Office of the Ombudsman for graft and grave abuse of authority for allegedly conspiring to illegally mine and sell nickel ores from their ancestral lands.

Pichay was a member of the House Committees on Agriculture And Food, Energy, Foreign Affairs, Good Government And Public Accountability, Government Enterprises And Privatization, Information And Communications Technology, Mindanao Affairs, and National Defense And Security during the 17th Congress.

In August 2018, following the ascension of Pampanga Representative Gloria Macapagal Arroyo to Speaker of the House, Pichay was elected House Deputy Speaker, replacing Representative Miro Quimbo who resigned to pursue his bid for minority leadership.

In the 2019 Philippine House of Representatives elections, Pichay again ran for another term. A disqualification case was filed against him by his predecessor former congresswoman Mary Elizabeth Ty-Delgado. The petition cited the same July 2011 Ombudsman decision that barred Pichay from working in government. Pichay responded by saying that the case has not been decided with finality and that a similar petition was junked by the COMELEC during the 2016 elections. He further argued that as a member of the House of Representatives, he was not subject to disciplinary actions of the Ombudsman. He later won the congressional seat with 102,361 votes.

In the 18th Congress, Pichay was elected again to be a Deputy House Speaker. During his term in the 18th Congress, he was a principal author of House Bill 6312 which was later signed into law as Republic Act 11470. The law established the National Academy of Sports System. Other bills he filed concerned the creation of a Surigao del Sur Special Economic Zone and Freeport, the separation of the Department of Environment and Natural Resources into a Department of Environment and a Department of Water, a Right to Travel Act, and an act establishing hospitals with 500–1,000 bed capacity in every region of the country, among others.

Pichay ran for reelection in the 2022 elections but lost to Construction Workers Solidarity party-list Rep. Romeo Momo Sr. The latter filed a disqualification case against Pichay citing the previous Ombudsman decision ordering his perpetual disqualification from public office, however, the case was dismissed by the Commission on Elections due to Pichay's pending appeal with the Supreme Court.

The Comelec En banc, in a judgment dated April 30, 2024, annulled Pichay, Jr.'s certificate of candidacy, granting Surigao del Sur's 1st congressional district Representative Romeo Momo Sr's certiorari petition and appeal. It also set a criminal investigation against Pichay Jr. for alleged material misrepresentation in his Certificate of Candidacy in the 2022 elections.

== Controversies ==
In July 2011, Pichay was slapped with a tax evasion complaint by the Bureau of Internal Revenue (BIR). According to BIR Commissioner Kim Henares, Pichay's net worth increased at around ₱58.5-million between 2008 and 2009 but did not declare his income for 2009. The Court of Tax Appeals, however, acquitted Pichay on May 3, 2018, and later affirmed its decision on December 6, 2019.

Pichay criticized Department of Environment and Natural Resources (DENR) Secretary Gina Lopez in September 2016 for closing down numerous mining sites in the country which were proven to have destroyed the Philippine natural environment. He called her 'crazy' during a House consultation where Lopez was not invited. It was later found that Pichay is the president of the board of directors of Claver Mineral Development Corp., a nickel mining firm operating in Barangay Cagdianao in the municipality of Claver, Surigao del Norte. Pichay reportedly acquired 60 percent of the mining firm. The mining firm's operation were scrapped by Gina Lopez after the firm violated the mining standard of the country, destroying the environment during the time the mine was in operation.

Pichay faces multiple charges of graft, malversation and violations of banking regulations in relation to the Express Savings Bank, Inc. acquisition. In June 2016, he, along with then-Senator elect Sherwin Gatchalian, other members of the Gatchalian family, and officials of LWUA, Wellex Group Inc. and Forum Pacific Inc. were charged by the Ombudsman for graft, malversation and violations of the General Banking Law of 2000 and the Manual of Regulation for Banks. According to then-Ombudsman Conchita Carpio-Morales, the government "effectively lost at least ₱80,003,070.51" in the acquisition. During his arraignment, Pichay pleaded not guilty to the charges. In March 2019, the Sandiganbayan ordered a 90-day suspension of Pichay. He was found guilty of three counts of graft by the Sandiganbayan in June 2022 and was sentenced to 18–30 years imprisonment with perpetual disqualification to hold public office. In August 2022, the Sandiganbayan upheld his conviction.

On October 20, 2016, the Ombudsman filed with the anti-graft court Sandiganbayan two criminal charges against Pichay in relation to a ₱1.5 million LWUA-sponsored National Chess Federation of the Philippines (NCFP) tournament named after him and held in his honor during his time as LWUA acting chairman in 2010. During his arraignment on February 23, 2017, he pleaded not guilty to the charges. However, on October 23, 2020, Pichay was convicted by Sandiganbayan 5th Division of graft and breach of conduct. He was sentenced to imprisonment of six to 10 years, with perpetual disqualification from holding public office. He was also ordered to pay a fine of ₱5,000 and, along with his co-accused, to jointly reimburse the LWUA of its ₱1.5 million budget, plus an interest of six percent per year. In a phone interview with The Manila Times, Pichay said that he respects the court's decision but would be filing a motion for reconsideration. On March 1, 2021, the Sandiganbayan acquitted Pichay, along with his two co-accused, of the graft and ethics charges filed against them due to the failure of the prosecution to prove that the sponsorship grant required the approval of Pichay's office.

== Personal life ==
Pichay is married to Maria Carla Lopez-Pichay, a former mayor of Cantilan, Surigao del Sur.

Pichay is an avid surfer and chess enthusiast. He was chairman of the Philippine Surfing Federation (PSF) and president of the National Chess Federation of the Philippines (NCFP). He is a close friend of Philippine chess Grandmasters Eugene Torre and Mark Paragua.

In 2022 July, Pichay was re-elected president of the NCFP.
