= Lanuza, Surigao del Sur =

Municipality in Surigao del Sur, Philippines

Lanuza
- Municipality
- Municipality of Lanuza
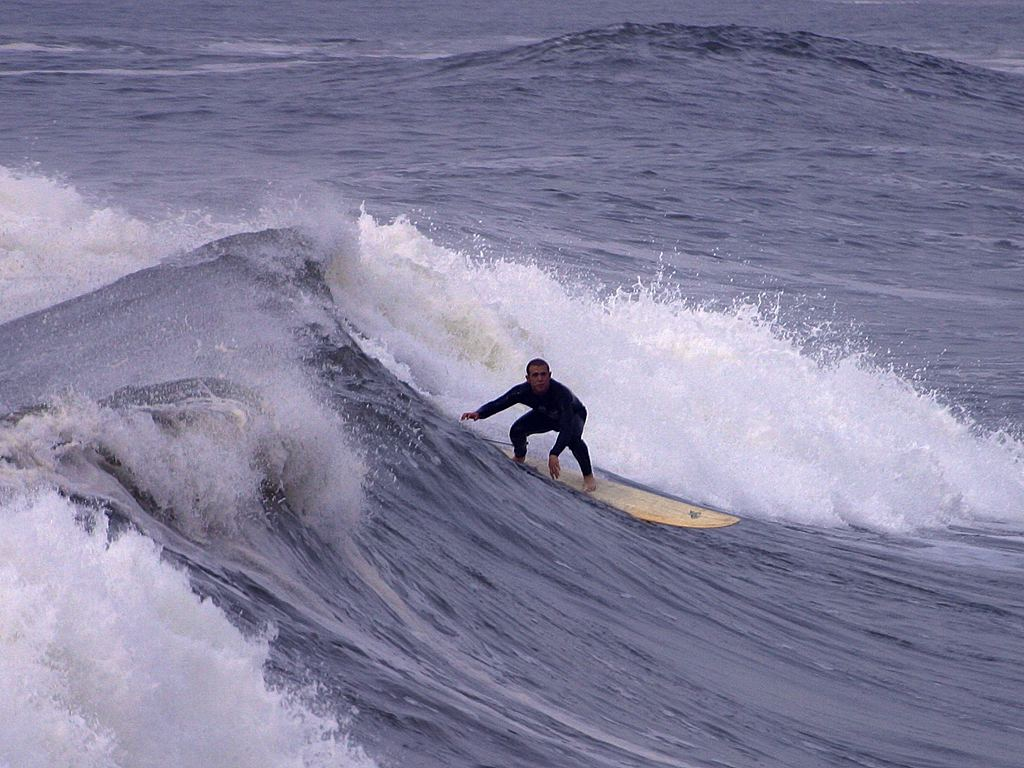
- Surfer in Lanuza

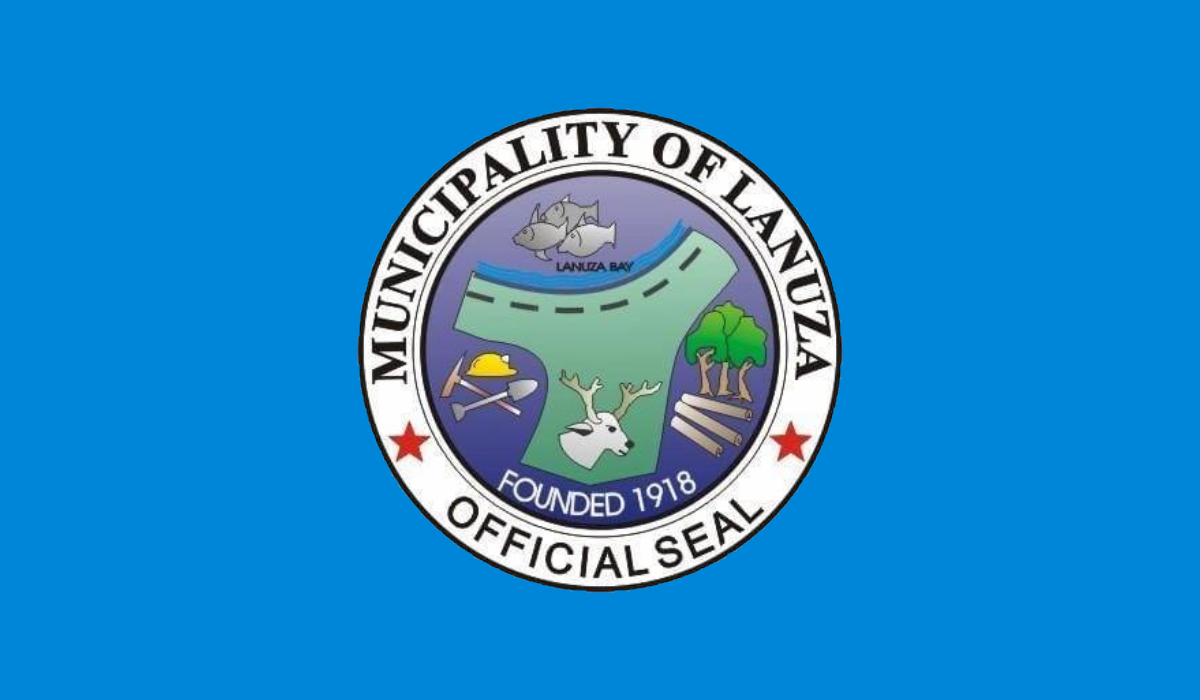
- Flag
- Nickname: Surf center of Surigao del Sur
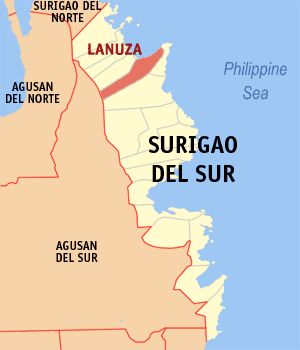
- Map of Surigao del Sur with Lanuza highlighted
- Interactive map of Lanuza
- Location within the Philippines
- Coordinates: 9°13′56″N 126°03′33″E
- Country: Philippines
- Region: Caraga
- Province: Surigao del Sur
- District: 1st district
- Founded: December 10, 1918
- Named for: Lanuza, Spain
- Barangays: 13 (see Barangays)

Government
  - Type: Sangguniang Bayan
  - Mayor: Marvin T. Azarcon
  - Vice Mayor: Charlyn L. Literato
  - Representative: Romeo S. Momo Sr.
  - Electorate: 10,245 voters (2025)

Area
  - Total: 290.60 km^{2} (112.20 sq mi)
- Elevation: 83 m (272 ft)
- Highest elevation: 609 m (1,998 ft)
- Lowest elevation: 0 m (0 ft)

Population (2024 census)
  - Total: 13,750
  - Density: 47.32/km^{2} (122.5/sq mi)
  - Households: 3,173

Economy
  - Income class: 3rd municipal income class
  - Poverty incidence: 17.55% (2023)
  - Revenue: ₱ 163.9 million (2024)
  - Assets: ₱ 398.4 million (2024)
  - Expenditure: ₱ 60.79 million (2024)
  - Liabilities: ₱ 140.7 million (2024)

Service provider
  - Electricity: Surigao del Sur 2 Electric Cooperative (SURSECO 2)
- Time zone: UTC+8 (PST)
- ZIP code: 8314
- PSGC: 1606810000
- IDD : area code: +63 (0)86
- Native languages: Surigaonon; Agusan; Cebuano; Kamayo; Tagalog
- Website: www.lanuza.gov.ph

Lanuza, officially the Municipality of Lanuza (Surigaonon: Lungsod nan Lanuza; Tagalog: Bayan ng Lanuza), is a municipality in the province of Surigao del Sur, Philippines. According to the 2024 census, it has a population of 13,750 people.

== History ==
On December 10, 1918, Executive Order No. 52 of American Governor General Francis Burton Harrison that was signed by Charles Yeater, divided Cantilan into three parts – Carrascal, present-day Cantilan and Lanuza. Now it is part of the settlement area called Carcanmadcarlan.

== Geography ==
=== Barangays ===
Lanuza is politically subdivided into 13 barangays. Each barangay consists of puroks while some have sitios.

In 1956, the sitio of Antao was converted into a barrio.

- Agsam
- Bocawe
- Bunga
- Gamuton
- Habag
- Mampi
- Nurcia
- Pakwan
- Sibahay
- Zone I (Poblacion)
- Zone II (Poblacion)
- Zone III (Poblacion)
- Zone IV (Poblacion)

=== Climate ===
Climate data for Lanuza
Month	Jan	Feb	Mar	Apr	May	Jun	Jul	Aug	Sep	Oct	Nov	Dec	Year
Mean daily maximum °C (°F)	28.8 (83.8)	29.1 (84.4)	29.9 (85.8)	31.0 (87.8)	31.9 (89.4)	31.8 (89.2)	31.8 (89.2)	31.9 (89.4)	31.9 (89.4)	31.4 (88.5)	30.3 (86.5)	29.4 (84.9)	30.8 (87.4)
Daily mean °C (°F)	25.6 (78.1)	25.7 (78.3)	26.3 (79.3)	27.0 (80.6)	27.9 (82.2)	27.7 (81.9)	27.7 (81.9)	27.7 (81.9)	27.7 (81.9)	27.4 (81.3)	26.6 (79.9)	26.1 (79.0)	27.0 (80.5)
Mean daily minimum °C (°F)	22.4 (72.3)	22.3 (72.1)	22.7 (72.9)	23.1 (73.6)	23.9 (75.0)	23.7 (74.7)	23.6 (74.5)	23.6 (74.5)	23.5 (74.3)	23.4 (74.1)	23.0 (73.4)	22.8 (73.0)	23.2 (73.7)
Average rainfall mm (inches)	849 (33.4)	711 (28.0)	549 (21.6)	384 (15.1)	245 (9.6)	172 (6.8)	154 (6.1)	134 (5.3)	151 (5.9)	220 (8.7)	489 (19.3)	711 (28.0)	4,769 (187.8)
Source: Climate-Data.org

Lanuza has a tropical rainforest climate (Af) with heavy to very heavy rainfall year-round and with extremely heavy rainfall frfrom December to February.

== Demographics ==
Population census of Lanuza
Year	Pop.	±% p.a.
1903	3,133	—
1939	7,314	+2.38%
1948	8,559	+1.76%
1960	10,296	+1.55%
1970	11,528	+1.14%
1975	8,313	−6.35%
1980	7,722	−1.46%
1990	9,051	+1.60%
1995	8,843	−0.43%
2000	10,057	+2.80%
2007	10,788	+0.97%
2010	11,857	+3.50%
2015	12,001	+0.23%
2020	13,642	+2.73%
2024	13,750	+0.19%
Source: Philippine Statistics Authority

== Economy ==
Poverty incidence of Lanuza (%)

Source: Philippine Statistics Authority

Lanuza belongs to the economic zone of Cantilan, one of the major economic zones of Surigao del Sur. Business opportunity is mainly dependent on agriculture, fishing, and eco-tourism. Lanuza was awarded a "clean and green" municipality title of the Caraga Region.

For telecommunication there are six cell sites operated by Smart Communications and Globe Telecom that cover the whole area of CarCanMadCarLan (Carrascal, Cantilan, Madrid, Carmen and Lanuza).

Two cable TV providers operate in Cantilan, Carrascal and Madrid. Cantilan has broadband internet with a number of internet cafes. The municipal building in Lanuza has a satellite connection, soon this will be extended to the school and may be offered as an internet cafe in the evenings.

Lanuza is noted as a surfing destination with its various surfing areas from Reef Breaks to Beach Breaks. Surfing season is between the months of November to March where big waves are in constant motion.
