= Carcanmadcarlan =

Settlement area in the Philippines

Coordinates: 9°20′N 125°59′E

CarCanMadCarLan is a settlement in Surigao del Sur, Philippines, located in the northernmost quarter of the province.

Itik-itik originated in the CarCanMadCarLan area, and imitates the movements of ducks among rice paddies and swampland.

== History ==
From the later half of the 16th century to 1919, the land area of the town of Cantilan was roughly 130,000 hectares which is approximately one fourth of the present area of the province of Surigao del Sur. This was the whole of Cantilan, which is now known, with the acronym of CARCANMADCARLAN, which is derived from the first three-letter syllables of the towns of Carrascal, Cantilan, Madrid, Carmen and Lanuza.

The original acronym of the whole area was CARCANLAN, which comprised Carrascal, Cantilan and Lanuza. On December 10, 1918, Executive Order No. 52 of American Governor General Francis Burton Harrison that was signed by Charles Yeater, divided Cantilan into three parts. On February 2, 1953, it became CARCANMADLAN when Madrid was created as a municipality and detached from the mother town by virtue of Executive Order by President Elpidio Quirino. When barangay Carmen of Lanuza was created as a town by Republic Act No. 6367, on August 16, 1971, the indigenous naming of the whole area that was once Cantilan finally became CARCANMADCARLAN.

== Topography ==
Known in the past for its vast timberlands and, for the present, with its over six thousand hectares of government-irrigated lands, it has seawaters in the east, mountains in the west, north and south. The plains have navigable rivers known as Carac-an, Union, Cantilan, Consuelo, Benoni, Bun-ot, Adlayan, Lancogue and some smaller ones. The extent of creeks and wetlands or lowlands and swamps were main landmarks and features of its old topography. The conversions and developments of the lowlands into rice paddies began in the 18th century when the friars were stationed therein. Those rivers and creeks that were developed fishponds did not begin earlier than the first of the 20th century.

This narrative history and other information was taken from the benevolent book of Mr. Eulogio Eleazar published 1980 entitled History of Cantilan.

== Climate ==
Carcanmadcarlan, like the whole island of Mindanao, is considered to have a tropical climate, with an average monthly precipitation of 257,2 mm (10,13 inches). Its wettest season is November to March; its dry season, characterized by brief afternoon showers and thunderstorms, runs from April to September.

Climate data for Carcanmadcarlan, Philippines
Month	Jan	Feb	Mar	Apr	May	Jun	Jul	Aug	Sep	Oct	Nov	Dec	Year
Mean daily maximum °C (°F)	29 (84)	29 (84)	30 (86)	31 (88)	32 (90)	32 (90)	32 (89)	32 (90)	32 (90)	32 (89)	31 (87)	29 (85)	30.92 (87.66)
Mean daily minimum °C (°F)	22 (72)	22 (72)	23 (73)	23 (74)	24 (75)	24 (75)	24 (75)	24 (75)	24 (75)	24 (75)	23 (74)	23 (73)	23 (74)
Average precipitation mm (inches)	582 (22.93)	389 (15.32)	283 (11.16)	200 (7.7)	123 (4.86)	110 (4.5)	140 (5.4)	115 (4.53)	122 (4.82)	220 (8.5)	378 (14.89)	430 (16.91)	1,015 (39.98)
Source: http://www.wunderground.com/q/zmw:00000.20.98752

== Transportation ==
The area is passed by the meanwhile completely concreted Surigao-Tandag coastal road. However, there are also harbours in Cantilan and Lanuza. Even if the river-harbour of Cantilan (in the Cantilan river) is only usable by Pump boats, the "Consuelo Port" (east side of the peninsula Capungan) can be reached also by bigger ships. The Tandag Airfield (IATA: TDG, ICAO: RPMW) is also in use again since 2014.

== Towns ==
- Carrascal
- Cantilan
- Madrid
- Carmen
- Lanuza
