= Itik-itik =

Filipino folk dance

Itik-itik is a mimetic folk dance in the Philippines based on the movement of ducks. It originated in Cantilan, Surigao del Sur and was later documented by National Artist for Dance Francisca Reyes-Aquino.

Originating from a dance called Sibay and performed to the tune Dejado, folklore says in a barrio of Cantilan during a baptismal party, an expert young danseuse named Kanang was so carried away by the music. She then began to improvise short, choppy steps similar to ducks and how they splash water on their backs. The dance immediately became popular in the province for stage performances and social dancing.

Fellow Cantilan native Antonino Arreza (a grandfather of Prospero Pichay, Jr.) is believed to have later composed the lyrics to accompany the Itik-Itik. Below is the song in the original Cantilangnon dialect:

Itik-itik (original version)
Itik-itik di-in kaw gikan
Itik-itik sa Pandagitan
Itik-itik nag uno didto
Itik-itik nagpupasiyo

Itik-itik unoy taghinang
Itik-itik naglangoy-langoy
Itik-itik unoy tagkitac
Itik-itik suban-ong isda

Itik-itik hain kaw singod
Itik-itik ay magpahuway
Itik-itik unoy hingtungdan
Luja na an ak' kalawasan

Other popular dances known to have originated in Cantilan and the wider Surigao provinces are Sumyajaw (“Monkey dance”), Manujo-Panujo (a Manobo courtship dance), and Sirong (a war dance).

== External Video ==
- The National Artists of the Philippines, Volume 1
- Philippine Travel Guide
