= Surigao del Sur's 1st congressional district =

Legislative district of the Philippines

- Constituency for the House of Representatives of the Philippines
- Location of Surigao del Sur within the Philippines
- Province: Surigao del Sur
- Region: Caraga
- Population: 369,785 (2020)
- Electorate: 449,070 (2022)
- Major settlements: 14 LGUs: Cities; Tandag; Municipalities; Bayabas; Cagwait; Cantilan; Carmen; Carrascal; Cortes; Lanuza; Lianga; Madrid; Marihatag; San Agustin; San Miguel; Tago
- Area: 3,410.64 km^{2} (1,316.86 sq mi)

Current constituency
- Created: 1987
- Representative: Romeo Momo
- Political party: Nacionalista
- Congressional bloc: Majority

Surigao del Sur's 1st congressional district is one of the two congressional districts of the Philippines in the province of Surigao del Sur. It has been represented in the House of Representatives since 1987. The district consists of the provincial capital city of Tandag and the northern municipalities of Bayabas, Cagwait, Cantilan, Carmen, Carrascal, Cortes, Lanuza, Lianga, Madrid, Marihatag, San Agustin, San Miguel and Tago. It is currently represented in the 20th Congress by Romeo S. Momo, Sr. of the Nacionalista Party (NP).

== Representation history ==
#	Image	Member	Term of office		Congress	Party	Electoral history	Constituent LGUs
#	Image	Member	Start	End	Congress	Party	Electoral history	Constituent LGUs
=== Surigao del Sur's 1st district for the House of Representatives of the Philippines ===
District created February 2, 1987 from Surigao del Sur's at-large district.
1		Mario S. Ty	June 30, 1987	June 30, 1998	8th	UNIDO	Elected in 1987.	1987–present Bayabas, Cagwait, Cantilan, Carmen, Carrascal, Cortes, Lanuza, Lianga, Madrid, Marihatag, San Agustin, San Miguel, Tago, Tandag
1		Mario S. Ty	June 30, 1987	June 30, 1998	9th	Lakas	Re-elected in 1992.	1987–present Bayabas, Cagwait, Cantilan, Carmen, Carrascal, Cortes, Lanuza, Lianga, Madrid, Marihatag, San Agustin, San Miguel, Tago, Tandag
1		Mario S. Ty	June 30, 1987	June 30, 1998	10th	Lakas	Re-elected in 1995.	1987–present Bayabas, Cagwait, Cantilan, Carmen, Carrascal, Cortes, Lanuza, Lianga, Madrid, Marihatag, San Agustin, San Miguel, Tago, Tandag
2		Prospero Pichay Jr.	June 30, 1998	June 30, 2007	11th	Lakas	Elected in 1998.	1987–present Bayabas, Cagwait, Cantilan, Carmen, Carrascal, Cortes, Lanuza, Lianga, Madrid, Marihatag, San Agustin, San Miguel, Tago, Tandag
2		Prospero Pichay Jr.	June 30, 1998	June 30, 2007	12th	Lakas	Re-elected in 2001.	1987–present Bayabas, Cagwait, Cantilan, Carmen, Carrascal, Cortes, Lanuza, Lianga, Madrid, Marihatag, San Agustin, San Miguel, Tago, Tandag
2		Prospero Pichay Jr.	June 30, 1998	June 30, 2007	13th	Lakas	Re-elected in 2004.	1987–present Bayabas, Cagwait, Cantilan, Carmen, Carrascal, Cortes, Lanuza, Lianga, Madrid, Marihatag, San Agustin, San Miguel, Tago, Tandag
3		Philip A. Pichay	June 30, 2007	January 26, 2016	14th	Lakas	Elected in 2007.	1987–present Bayabas, Cagwait, Cantilan, Carmen, Carrascal, Cortes, Lanuza, Lianga, Madrid, Marihatag, San Agustin, San Miguel, Tago, Tandag
3		Philip A. Pichay	June 30, 2007	January 26, 2016	15th	Lakas	Re-elected in 2010.	1987–present Bayabas, Cagwait, Cantilan, Carmen, Carrascal, Cortes, Lanuza, Lianga, Madrid, Marihatag, San Agustin, San Miguel, Tago, Tandag
3		Philip A. Pichay	June 30, 2007	January 26, 2016	16th	Lakas	Re-elected in 2013. Removed from office after an electoral protest.	1987–present Bayabas, Cagwait, Cantilan, Carmen, Carrascal, Cortes, Lanuza, Lianga, Madrid, Marihatag, San Agustin, San Miguel, Tago, Tandag
4		Mary Elizabeth Ty-Delgado	January 26, 2016	June 30, 2016	16th	Liberal	Declared winner of 2013 elections.	1987–present Bayabas, Cagwait, Cantilan, Carmen, Carrascal, Cortes, Lanuza, Lianga, Madrid, Marihatag, San Agustin, San Miguel, Tago, Tandag
(2)		Prospero Pichay Jr.	June 30, 2016	June 30, 2022	17th	Lakas	Elected in 2016.	1987–present Bayabas, Cagwait, Cantilan, Carmen, Carrascal, Cortes, Lanuza, Lianga, Madrid, Marihatag, San Agustin, San Miguel, Tago, Tandag
(2)		Prospero Pichay Jr.	June 30, 2016	June 30, 2022	18th	Lakas	Re-elected in 2019.	1987–present Bayabas, Cagwait, Cantilan, Carmen, Carrascal, Cortes, Lanuza, Lianga, Madrid, Marihatag, San Agustin, San Miguel, Tago, Tandag
5		Romeo S. Momo Sr.	June 30, 2022	Incumbent	19th	Independent	Elected in 2022.	1987–present Bayabas, Cagwait, Cantilan, Carmen, Carrascal, Cortes, Lanuza, Lianga, Madrid, Marihatag, San Agustin, San Miguel, Tago, Tandag
5		Romeo S. Momo Sr.	June 30, 2022	Incumbent	20th	Nacionalista	Re-elected in 2025.	1987–present Bayabas, Cagwait, Cantilan, Carmen, Carrascal, Cortes, Lanuza, Lianga, Madrid, Marihatag, San Agustin, San Miguel, Tago, Tandag

== Election results ==
=== 2025 ===
Candidate	Party	Votes	%
Romeo Momo (incumbent)	Nacionalista Party	161,895	72.82
Justin Pelenio	Aksyon Demokratiko	60,416	27.18
Total		222,311	100.00
Valid votes		222,311	91.76
Invalid/blank votes		19,955	8.24
Total votes		242,266	100.00
Registered voters/turnout		276,452	87.63
Nacionalista Party hold			
Source: Commission on Elections

=== 2022 ===
Candidate	Party	Votes	%
Romeo Momo	Independent	106,907	50.76
Prospero Pichay Jr. (incumbent)	Lakas–CMD	97,783	46.43
Noneng Momo	National Unity Party	5,924	2.81
Total		210,614	100.00
Total votes		229,807	–
Registered voters/turnout		260,806	88.11
Independent gain from Lakas–CMD			
Source: Commission on Elections

== See also ==
- Legislative districts of Surigao del Sur
