= Edwin Gardiola =

Filipino politician and businessman (born 1955)

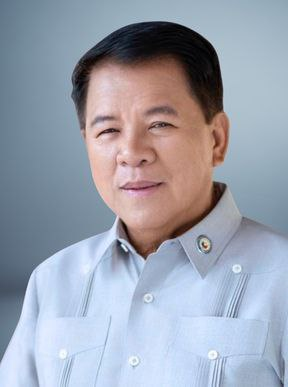
- Official portrait, 2025

Member of the House of Representatives of the Philippines for Construction Workers Solidarity
- Incumbent
- Assumed office June 30, 2022
- Preceded by: Romeo Momo

Personal details
- Born: Tirso Edwin Loleng Gardiola; September 24, 1955 (age 71) Mataasnakahoy, Batangas, Philippines
- Party: CWS (partylist; 2021–present)
- Spouse: Judy Silva
- Children: 4 (Kim Ann Esguerra, Katrina Marie Katigbak, Kaila, and Ken Martin)
- Education: National University (BS)
- Occupation: Civil engineer, businessman, politician

Tirso Edwin Loleng Gardiola (born September 24, 1955) is a Filipino civil engineer, transportation executive, and politician currently serving as the first nominee of the Construction Workers Solidarity (CWS) Party-List in the House of Representatives of the Philippines since 2022. He owns a 870 Million Peso mansion in Newport Coast, California.

== Early life and education ==
Gardiola was born on September 24, 1959, in Mataasnakahoy, Batangas to Macario Gardiola and Severina Loleng. He earned his Bachelor of Science in Civil Engineering from the National University in Manila.

== Business career ==
Before entering politics, Gardiola served as chairman of two major Philippine transportation companies:

- JAM Liner – One of Luzon's largest provincial bus operators
- Philtranco – The country's oldest bus company, established in 1914

He also owned several construction and real estate firms, including JSG Construction (named after his wife, Judy Silva Gardiola) and Virkar Realty Corporation.

In 2009, the Philippine Center for Investigative Journalism (PCIJ) reported that JSG Construction is owned by Gardiola and his wife Judy. Edwin's brother Elmer and his wife Elaine are owners of E. Gardiola Construction, while Elmer is also listed as an incorporator of JSG. The PCIJ reports that JSG and E. Gardiola Construction are among the top ten contractors working with the Department of Public Works and Highways (DPWH) from 2000 to 2008 under president Gloria Macapagal Arroyo's administration.

In a 2014 House of Representatives inquiry, Gardiola's firm JSG Construction was implicated in:

- ₱6 billion worth of unreported DPWH projects during the Arroyo administration
- Securing "Triple A" contracts despite only possessing a "B" license from the Philippine Contractors Accreditation Board (PCAB)

== Political career ==
=== House of Representatives (2022–present) ===
Elected under the Construction Workers Solidarity party-list in 2022, Gardiola has focused on labor rights legislation for construction workers. His committee assignments include:

- Committee on Public Works and Highways
- Committee on Transportation

He was named first nominee of CWS once again for the 2025 election. However, in February 2025, a disqualification case was filed against CWS by Batangas gubernatorial candidate Jay Manalo Ilagan, when Gardiola attended a giveaway event at the Barako Fest in Lipa. The three sedan cars given as prizes were allegedly sponsored by Gardiola, an act which the complainant believes to constitute as vote buying.

Since becoming a Congress representative, two construction firms owned by Gardiola's relatives, Newington Builders and S-Ang Construction, were awarded P16 billion in flood control, road, and other infrastructure projects from 2023 to 2025.

== Tax evasion cases ==
In 2012, the Bureau of Internal Revenue (BIR) filed criminal complaints against Gardiola and his companies for:

- Purchasing undeclared luxury vehicles (including BMW, Lexus, and Jaguar models) between 2006 and 2009 despite declaring minimal income
- Unpaid dues for the purchase of three Lexus vehicles in 2009 as a corporate officer of Woodheights

== Personal life ==
Gardiola is married to physician Judy Silva Gardiola, after whom JSG Construction is named. They have two daughters, Kim Ann and Katrina Mara Gardiola, who have served as corporate officers in his companies.
