= San Miguel, Surigao del Sur =

Municipality in Surigao del Sur, Philippines

San Miguel
- Municipality
- Municipality of San Miguel
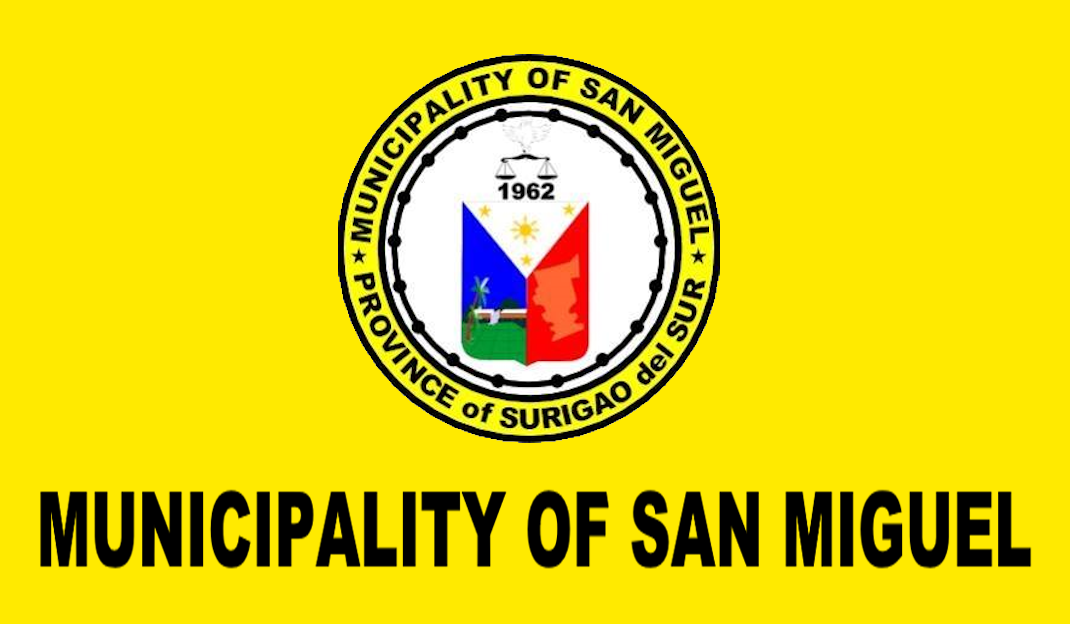
- Flag

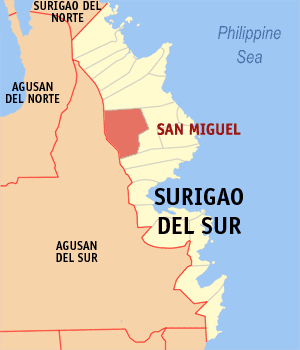
- Map of Surigao del Sur with San Miguel highlighted
- Interactive map of San Miguel
- Location within the Philippines
- Coordinates: 8°55′56″N 126°02′25″E
- Country: Philippines
- Region: Caraga
- Province: Surigao del Sur
- District: 1st district
- Barangays: 18 (see Barangays)

Government
  - Type: Sangguniang Bayan
  - Mayor: Michael T. Corilla
  - Vice Mayor: Reynaldo F. Demoto
  - Representative: Romeo S. Momo Sr.
  - Electorate: 28,243 voters (2025)

Area
  - Total: 558.00 km^{2} (215.45 sq mi)
- Elevation: 38 m (125 ft)
- Highest elevation: 231 m (758 ft)
- Lowest elevation: 8 m (26 ft)

Population (2024 census)
  - Total: 41,942
  - Density: 75.165/km^{2} (194.68/sq mi)
  - Households: 8,977

Economy
  - Income class: 1st municipal income class
  - Poverty incidence: 24.31% (2023)
  - Revenue: ₱ 303.1 million (2024)
  - Assets: ₱ 814 million (2024)
  - Expenditure: ₱ 125.7 million (2024)
  - Liabilities: ₱ 265.5 million (2024)

Service provider
  - Electricity: Surigao del Sur 2 Electric Cooperative (SURSECO 2)
- Time zone: UTC+8 (PST)
- ZIP code: 8301
- PSGC: 1606816000
- IDD : area code: +63 (0)86
- Native languages: Surigaonon; Agusan; Cebuano; Tagalog

San Miguel, officially the Municipality of San Miguel (Surigaonon: Lungsod nan San Miguel; Tagalog: Bayan ng San Miguel), is a municipality in the province of Surigao del Sur, Philippines. According to the 2024 census, it has a population of 41,942 people.

With an area of 55,800 hectares (138,000 acres), it is the largest among the municipalities and cities in the province. It is also one of the only two landlocked municipalities in the province along with Tagbina.

== Antique gold discoveries ==
In 1981, Edilberto "Berto" Morales, a farmer employed as a bulldozer operator in an irrigation project accidentally unearthed a hoard of authentic gold artifacts and jewelries weighing up to 30 kg in Barangay Magroyong which includes masks, figurines, bowls, daggers, trinkets, belts, and all sorts of body ornaments. Through a support of several historical accounts, archaeologists and historians believed that the gold items were associated between 10th to 13th century used by pre-colonial Filipinos, years before Spaniards came to the country. Some of the golden artifacts, jewelries and ornaments, dubbed as the "Surigao Treasure", were then sold to and currently exhibited at the Ayala Museum in the city of Makati, Philippines and some pieces at the Central Bank of the Philippines. Morales' discoveries were then considered one of the first proofs that gold was an important link between the early people of pre-colonial Philippines and the neighboring Southeast Asian countries.

== Geography ==
=== Barangays ===
San Miguel is politically subdivided into 18 barangays. Each barangay consists of puroks while some have sitios.

- Bagyang
- Baras
- Bitaugan
- Bolhoon
- Calatngan
- Carromata
- Castillo
- Libas Gua
- Libas Sud
- Magroyong
- Mahayag (Maitum)
- Patong
- Poblacion
- Sagbayan
- San Roque
- Siagao
- Tina
- Umalag

=== Climate ===
Climate data for San Miguel, Surigao del Sur
Month	Jan	Feb	Mar	Apr	May	Jun	Jul	Aug	Sep	Oct	Nov	Dec	Year
Mean daily maximum °C (°F)	27 (81)	27 (81)	28 (82)	29 (84)	29 (84)	29 (84)	29 (84)	30 (86)	30 (86)	29 (84)	28 (82)	28 (82)	29 (83)
Mean daily minimum °C (°F)	23 (73)	23 (73)	23 (73)	23 (73)	24 (75)	24 (75)	24 (75)	24 (75)	24 (75)	24 (75)	24 (75)	23 (73)	24 (74)
Average precipitation mm (inches)	161 (6.3)	132 (5.2)	112 (4.4)	87 (3.4)	136 (5.4)	169 (6.7)	146 (5.7)	148 (5.8)	132 (5.2)	156 (6.1)	176 (6.9)	170 (6.7)	1,725 (67.8)
Average rainy days	20.0	16.2	18.3	17.3	24.0	26.7	27.5	27.5	26.5	26.4	23.8	21.0	275.2
Source: Meteoblue

== Demographics ==
Population census of San Miguel
Year	Pop.	±% p.a.
1970	9,307	—
1975	12,443	+6.00%
1980	17,642	+7.23%
1990	21,671	+2.08%
1995	24,006	+1.94%
2000	27,883	+3.26%
2007	32,737	+2.24%
2010	36,287	+3.82%
2015	39,340	+1.55%
2020	41,809	+1.29%
2024	41,942	+0.08%
Source: Philippine Statistics Authority

== Economy ==
Poverty incidence of San Miguel (%)

Source: Philippine Statistics Authority
