= Gatchalian =

Gatchalian is a Filipino surname (origin Gat Salian or Gatsalian i.e. Don Salian, a Tagalog chief) that may refer to the following people:

- C. E. Gatchalian (born 1974), Canadian playwright
- Rex Gatchalian (born 1979), Filipino politician
- Wes Gatchalian (born 1980), Filipino politician, brother of Rex
- Win Gatchalian (born 1974), Filipino politician and businessman, brother of Rex and Wes
