= Construction Workers Solidarity =

Political party in the Philippines

- — Philippine partylist —
- Full name: Construction Workers Solidarity, Inc.
- Abbreviation: CWS
- Chairperson: Edwin Gardiola
- Sector(s) represented: Construction workers
- Colors: Orange

Current representation (20th Congress)
- Seats in the House of Representatives: 1 / 3 (Out of 63 party-list seats)
- Representative(s): Edwin Gardiola

Website
- cwspartylistph.com

Construction Workers Solidarity (CWS) is a political organization in the Philippines which seeks to represent the interests of construction workers. Following the 2019 Philippine House of Representatives elections, CWS secured one seat through the party-list vote. The CWS was established in the 1990s.

== Electoral history ==
=== 2016 elections ===
In the 2016 national elections, CWS Party List was allowed by the Commission on Elections (Comelec) to join the elections as an official party list. They were not able to come up with enough votes to secure a seat in the 2016 elections. In the 2019 mid-term elections, CWS Party List joined anew and was able to secure a congressional seat with former Department of Public Works and Highways (DPWH) Undersecretary Romeo S. Momo as the representative of the construction workers sector.

=== 2022 elections ===
CWS Party List filed its Certificate of Candidacy for the 2022 Philippine Elections. on October 5, 2021. The CWS has pledged to continue the implementation of the Build! Build! Build! program of President Rodrigo Duterte's administration which has been overseen by DPWH secretary Mark Villar. CWS Party-list being part of 19th Congress got 412,333 total of votes in the 2022 election and was number 21 on the total vote getters for the party-list election of the Philippines.

CWS Party-list is now represented by engineer and entrepreneur Edwin Gardiola at the House of Representatives. Since becoming a Congress representative, two construction firms owned by Gardiola's relatives were awarded P16 billion in flood control, road, and other infrastructure projects from 2023 to 2025.

=== 2025 elections ===
Incumbent representative Edwin Gardiola is the first nominee of CWS for the 2025 election. However, in February 2025, a disqualification case was filed against CWS by Batangas gubernatorial candidate Jay Manalo Ilagan, when Gardiola attended a giveaway event at the Barako Fest in Lipa. Three sedan cars given as prizes were allegedly sponsored by Gardiola, which the complainant believes to constitute vote buying.

== Work and advocacies ==
The Construction Workers Solidarity Party List has been involved in furthering the advocacies that involve the construction workers. CWS has provided various forms of assistance in the form of financial, medical transport services, displaced workers cash support, and vaccine provision against the COVID-19 pandemic, among others.

CWS Party List has filed 120 bills that it has principally authored and co-authored 103 bills.

According to a Gardiola family spokesperson, the Security and Exchange Commission registration of the family's JSG Construction was revoked in 2006 "due to the oversight of the company’s previous accountant".

== Electoral results ==
Election	Votes	%	Secured Seats	Party-List Seats	Congress	1st Representative	2nd Representative	3rd Representative
2016	9,121	0.282	0 / 3	59	17th Congress; 2016–2019	—N/a	—N/a	—N/a
2019	277,940	1.00%	1 / 3	61	18th Congress; 2019–2022	Romeo Momo	—N/a	—N/a
2022	412,333	1.1204%	1 / 3	63	19th Congress; 2022–2025	Edwin Gardiola	—N/a	—N/a
2025	477,517	1.14%	1 / 3	63	20th Congress; 2025–2028	Edwin Gardiola	—N/a	—N/a
Note: For party-list representation in the House of Representatives of the Philippines, a party can win a maximum of three seats.
