= Sirong Festival =

Festival in Surigao del Sur, Philippines

Sirong Festival is an ethnic mardi-gras parade. Although some other municipalities in the province of Surigao del Sur are claiming to have this festival originated from them. As most of this coastal towns are founded during the pre-Spanish occupation and is both claiming the story of being attacked by the moros. Sirong festival in Cantilan is the popular one than other festivals.

Sirong is known to be a war dance between Muslims and Christians, reflecting the Christianization of the early Cantilangnons. The Manobos and the Mamanwas are known to be the early Cantilangnons.

The Municipality of Cantilan started the Sirong festival in 2004 days before the town fiesta. It was attended by other neighboring Municipalities in Surigao. With each contingents numbering to almost a hundred performers. The event was a great success with the winner bringing home cash prizes. On August 14, 2008, Cantilan once again hosted the event with the help from other local organizations such as the BARDUGS Association of Cantilan in full support by the Local Government Unit of Cantilan. As promised by the mayor that this festival will be held annually in this town.

== See also ==
- Sinulog
- Moro-moro
