= Carrascal =

Municipality in Surigao del Sur, Philippines

- Municipality
- Municipality of Carrascal
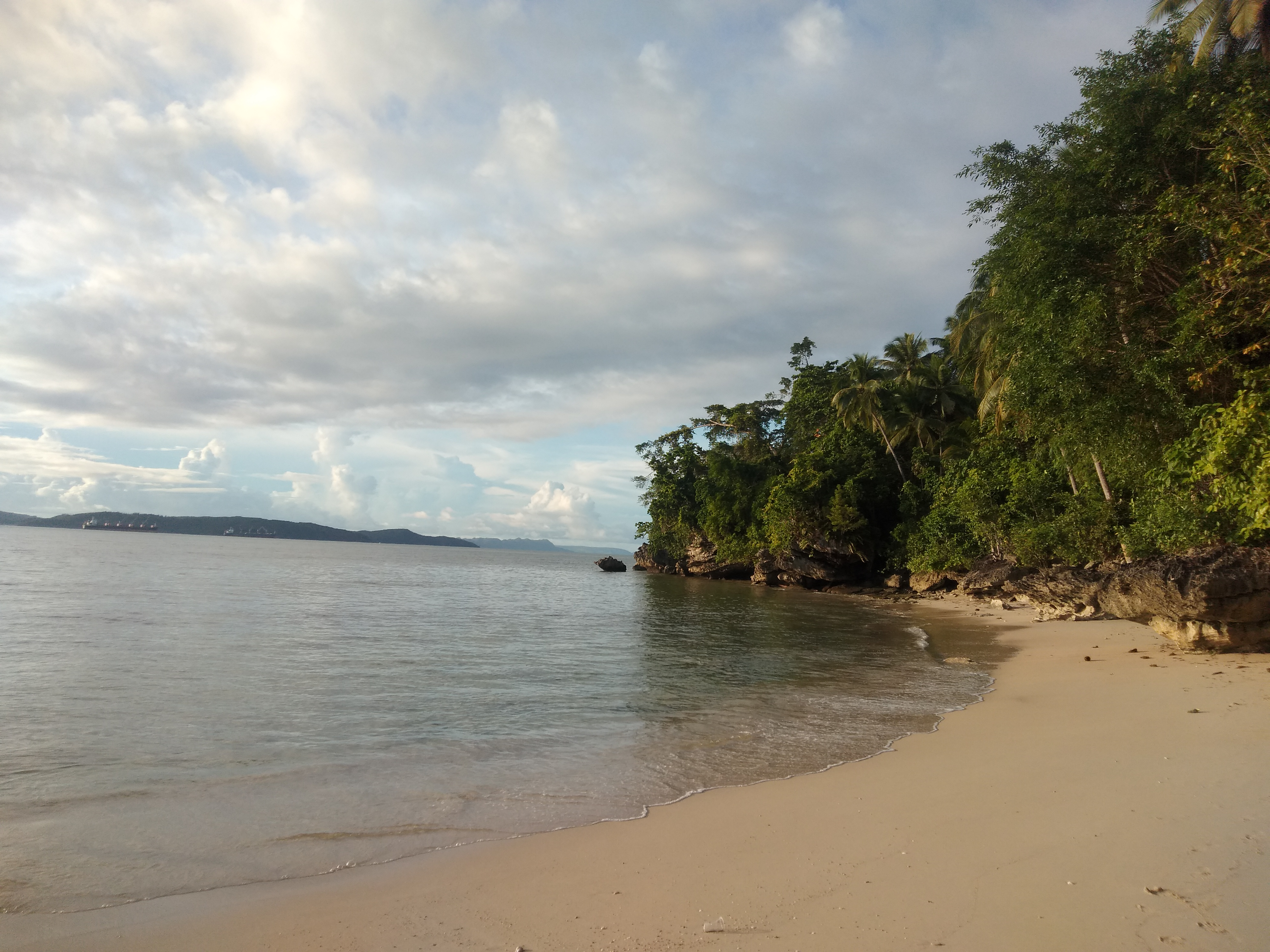

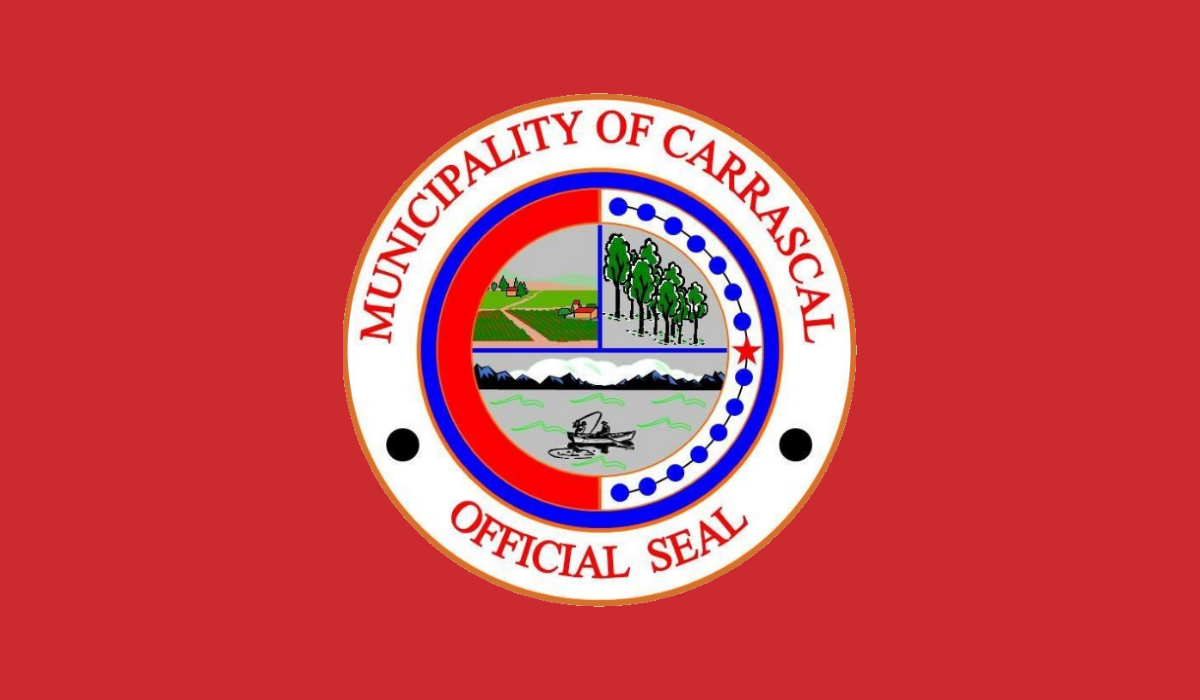
- Flag

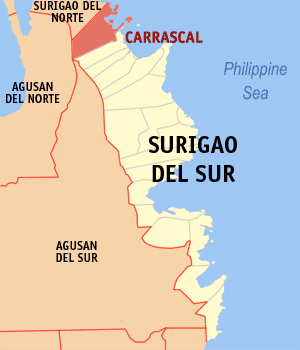
- Map of Surigao del Sur with Carrascal highlighted
- Interactive map of Carrascal
- Location within the Philippines
- Coordinates: 9°22′06″N 125°56′58″E
- Country: Philippines
- Region: Caraga
- Province: Surigao del Sur
- District: 1st district
- Barangays: 14 (see Barangays)

Government
  - Type: Sangguniang Bayan
  - Mayor: Vicente H. Pimentel III
  - Vice Mayor: Jessie James T. Valle
  - Representative: Romeo S. Momo Sr.
  - Electorate: 18,603 voters (2025)

Area
  - Total: 265.80 km^{2} (102.63 sq mi)
- Elevation: 31 m (102 ft)
- Highest elevation: 265 m (869 ft)
- Lowest elevation: 0 m (0 ft)

Population (2024 census)
  - Total: 25,672
  - Density: 96.584/km^{2} (250.15/sq mi)
  - Households: 5,801

Economy
  - Income class: 1st municipal income class
  - Poverty incidence: 10.68% (2023)
  - Revenue: ₱ 408 million (2023, 2024)
  - Assets: ₱ 1,483 million (2023, 2024)
  - Expenditure: ₱ 364.8 million (2024)
  - Liabilities: ₱ 264.7 million (2023, 2024)

Service provider
  - Electricity: Surigao del Sur 2 Electric Cooperative (SURSECO 2)
- Time zone: UTC+8 (PST)
- ZIP code: 8318
- PSGC: 1606807000
- IDD : area code: +63 (0)86
- Native languages: Surigaonon; Agusan; Cebuano; Tagalog
- Website: www.carrascal.gov.ph

Carrascal, officially the Municipality of Carrascal (Surigaonon: Lungsod nan Carrascal; Tagalog: Bayan ng Carrascal), is a municipality in the province of Surigao del Sur, Philippines. According to the 2024 census, it has a population of 25,672 people.

== Geography ==
Unique physical features of Carrascal are the uneven distribution of its lowlands and rolling hills. Carrascal is the boundary town of Surigao del Sur with Surigao del Norte.

=== Barangays ===
Carrascal is politically subdivided into 14 barangays. Each barangay consists of puroks while some have sitios.

Babuyan, Dahican and Caglayag were converted into a barrio in 1956.

- Adlay
- Babuyan
- Bacolod
- Baybay (Poblacion)
- Bon-ot
- Caglayag
- Dahican
- Doyos (Poblacion)
- Embarcadero (Poblacion)
- Gamuton
- Panikian
- Pantukan
- Saca (Poblacion)
- Tag-Anito

=== Climate ===
Climate data for Carrascal
Month	Jan	Feb	Mar	Apr	May	Jun	Jul	Aug	Sep	Oct	Nov	Dec	Year
Mean daily maximum °C (°F)	28.7 (83.7)	29.0 (84.2)	29.9 (85.8)	31.0 (87.8)	31.8 (89.2)	31.8 (89.2)	31.7 (89.1)	31.9 (89.4)	31.8 (89.2)	31.2 (88.2)	30.2 (86.4)	29.2 (84.6)	30.7 (87.2)
Daily mean °C (°F)	25.5 (77.9)	25.6 (78.1)	26.3 (79.3)	27.0 (80.6)	27.8 (82.0)	27.7 (81.9)	27.7 (81.9)	27.8 (82.0)	27.6 (81.7)	27.2 (81.0)	26.6 (79.9)	26.0 (78.8)	26.9 (80.4)
Mean daily minimum °C (°F)	22.4 (72.3)	22.3 (72.1)	22.7 (72.9)	23.1 (73.6)	23.9 (75.0)	23.7 (74.7)	23.7 (74.7)	23.7 (74.7)	23.5 (74.3)	23.3 (73.9)	23.1 (73.6)	22.8 (73.0)	23.2 (73.7)
Average rainfall mm (inches)	918 (36.1)	760 (29.9)	603 (23.7)	418 (16.5)	242 (9.5)	166 (6.5)	143 (5.6)	126 (5.0)	143 (5.6)	230 (9.1)	519 (20.4)	768 (30.2)	5,036 (198.1)
Source: Climate-Data.org (modeled/calculated data, not measured locally)

Carrascal has a tropical rainforest climate (Af) with heavy to very heavy rainfall year-round and with extremely heavy rainfall from December to February. With over 5000 mm of rain, it is the wettest place in the Philippines.

== Demographics ==
Population census of Carrascal

Year	Pop.	±% p.a.
1903	2,489	—
1939	5,557	+2.26%
1948	5,988	+0.83%
1960	7,898	+2.33%
1970	8,240	+0.42%

Year	Pop.	±% p.a.
1975	9,230	+2.30%
1980	12,810	+6.77%
1990	12,693	−0.09%
1995	12,018	−1.02%
2000	13,157	+1.96%

Year	Pop.	±% p.a.
2007	14,283	+1.14%
2010	16,529	+5.46%
2015	22,479	+6.03%
2020	24,586	+1.90%
2024	25,672	+1.04%

Source: Philippine Statistics Authority

== Economy ==
Poverty incidence of Carrascal (%)

Source: Philippine Statistics Authority

=== Mining industry ===
Carrascal, known for its mining economy, is home to a number of large-scale mining firms. In early 2017, CTP Construction and Mining Corporation and Carrascal Nickel Corporation that operated near coastal areas while Marcventures Mining and Development Corporation in a declared watershed were found violating the Department of Environment and Natural Resources (DENR) policy, thus sanctioned for closure. Economic pressures felt immediately by its local stakeholders; controversially and concurrently, the Philippine political machinery intervened at the national stage. Short-lived environmental court sanctions was then rescinded later that same year due to an injunctive relief from "filed motions and appeal for reconsideration" allowing mining re-operations that environmental group Caraga Watch vehemently contested as "inutile and bankrupt mining law and policies;" further prompting for pre-emptive, sensible environmental watch and on-going national/local discussions before waking-up to extractive gas drill operations in its shorelines.

=== Special areas of economic considerations ===
The ideal candidate site of proposed wind power projects is located approximately 300 meter masl in the mining area near Carrascal. It is accessible from a highway under perpetual reconstruction and further made accessible by exploration roads constructed by mining companies. The terrain is mostly flat, with minimal vegetation, causing minimal turbulence to wind flow in the area. It overlooks the Philippine Sea from the southeast and the north-west directions. Some permanent deformations of small trees indicate that the wind typically comes from the north-east direction. Ground measurements yielded wind speeds of 8–11 m/s, which, by industry standards has excellent wind power potential. However, further validation studies of at least one year of wind data gathered from the site is nonexistent. Transmission lines of the local cooperative pass through this wind power candidate site, making it more attractive for wind and/ solar energy development to alleviate badly needed energy infrastructure to sustain large scale industrialization and its lofty bid to become the northernmost "city" of Surigao del Sur.
