= Carmen, Surigao del Sur =

Municipality in Surigao del Sur, Philippines

Carmen
- Municipality
- Municipality of Carmen
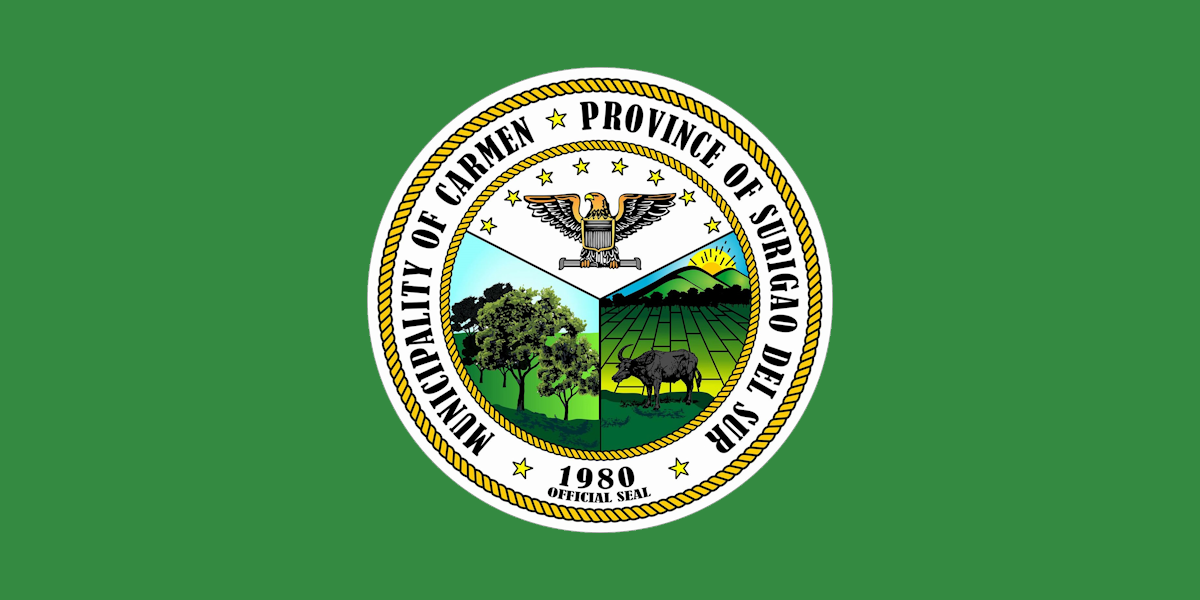
- Flag

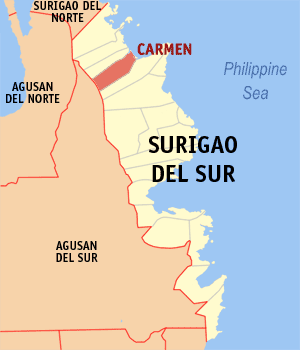
- Map of Surigao del Sur with Carmen highlighted
- Interactive map of Carmen
- Location within the Philippines
- Coordinates: 9°13′44″N 126°01′00″E
- Country: Philippines
- Region: Caraga
- Province: Surigao del Sur
- District: 1st district
- Founded: 1918
- Barangays: 8 (see Barangays)

Government
  - Type: Sangguniang Bayan
  - Mayor: Nestor S. Valeroso
  - Vice Mayor: Jane V. Plaza
  - Representative: Romeo S. Momo Sr.
  - Electorate: 8,629 voters (2025)

Area
  - Total: 160.01 km^{2} (61.78 sq mi)
- Elevation: 90 m (300 ft)
- Highest elevation: 710 m (2,330 ft)
- Lowest elevation: 0 m (0 ft)

Population (2024 census)
  - Total: 11,859
  - Density: 74.114/km^{2} (191.95/sq mi)
  - Households: 2,693

Economy
  - Income class: 4th municipal income class
  - Poverty incidence: 18.33% (2023)
  - Revenue: ₱ 130.2 million (2024)
  - Assets: ₱ 300.6 million (2024)
  - Expenditure: ₱ 75.77 million (2024)
  - Liabilities: ₱ 52.92 million (2024)

Service provider
  - Electricity: Surigao del Sur 2 Electric Cooperative (SURSECO 2)
- Time zone: UTC+8 (PST)
- ZIP code: 8315
- PSGC: 1606806000
- IDD : area code: +63 (0)86
- Native languages: Surigaonon; Agusan; Cebuano; Tagalog
- Website: www.carmen-sds.gov.ph

Carmen, officially the Municipality of Carmen (Surigaonon: Lungsod nan Carmen; Tagalog: Bayan ng Carmen), is a municipality in the province of Surigao del Sur, Philippines. According to the 2024 census, it has a population of 11,859 people.

Located in Barangay Esperanza is the "Sua Cool Spring", developed for tourism with the accommodation to swim and party. The depth of the first basin is up to about 7 feet (2.1 m).

== Geography ==
=== Barangays ===
Carmen is politically subdivided into 8 barangays. Each barangay consists of puroks while some have sitios.

- Poblacion
- Santa Cruz
- Puyat
- Antao
- Cancavan
- Esperanza
- Hinapuyan
- San Vicente

== Demographics ==
Population census of Carmen
Year	Pop.	±% p.a.
1975	5,602	—
1980	7,827	+6.92%
1990	8,787	+1.16%
1995	8,248	−1.18%
2000	9,551	+3.19%
2007	10,078	+0.74%
2010	10,287	+0.75%
2015	10,347	+0.11%
2020	11,720	+2.66%
2024	11,859	+0.28%
Source: Philippine Statistics Authority

== Economy ==
Poverty incidence of Carmen (%)

Source: Philippine Statistics Authority
