= Romeo Momo =

Filipino civil engineer and politician (born 1952)

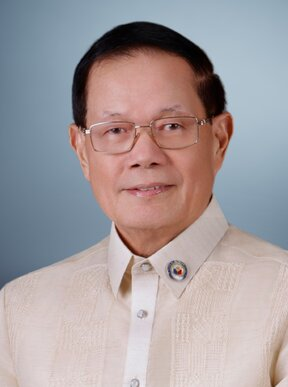
- Official portrait, 2025

Member of the House of Representatives from Surigao del Sur’s 1st district
- Incumbent
- Assumed office June 30, 2022
- Preceded by: Prospero Pichay Jr.

Member of the House of Representatives for Construction Workers Solidarity
- In office June 30, 2019 – June 30, 2022
- Preceded by: Position established
- Succeeded by: Edwin Gardiola

Personal details
- Born: Romeo Salazar Momo; August 6, 1952 (age 74) Tandag, Surigao del Sur, Philippines
- Party: Nacionalista (2024–present)
- Other political affiliations: Independent (2021–2024); CWS (2018–2022)
- Education: University of Mindanao (BS); Bukidnon State College (MPA)
- Occupation: Civil engineer, politician

Romeo "Romy" Salazar Momo Sr. (born August 6, 1952) is a Filipino civil engineer and politician. He is currently serving as representative of the 1st District of Surigao del Sur in the House of Representatives of the Philippines since 2022. He served as representative of the Construction Workers Solidarity partylist from 2019 to 2022.

== Early life and education ==
Momo was born on August 6, 1952, in Tandag to Magdaleno Momo and Eustaquia Salazar. He studied University of Mindanao with the degree of civil engineering. He finished Master of Public Administration at the Bukidnon State College. He took up short courses at the Harvard University – John F Kennedy School of Government.

== Career ==
Momo served as undersecretary of the Department of Public Works and Highways from 2008 to 2017. He served as national president of the Philippine Institute of Civil Engineers from 2012 to 2013.

== Political career ==
In 2019, Momo won as a nominee of the Construction Workers Solidarity partylist.

In 2022, Momo was elected as representative of the first district of Surigao del Sur after he beat Prospero Pichay Jr. over 9,124 votes.

== Personal life ==
Momo is married to Eleanor Momo and has four children.

== Electoral history ==
Electoral history of Romeo Momo
Year	Office	Party	Votes received				Result
Year	Office	Party	Total	%	P.	Swing	Result
2019	Representative (Party-list)	CWS	277,940	1.00%	28th	—N/a	Won
2022	Representative (Surigao del Sur–1st)	Independent	106,907	50.76%	1st	—N/a	Won
2025	Representative (Surigao del Sur–1st)	Nacionalista	161,895	72.82%	1st	—N/a	Won
