= Tabon =

Tabon may refer to:

== Places ==
- Tabon Caves, a group of caves located in Palawan, Philippines
- Tabon Island

- Tabon Island (Chile)
- Tabon Island (Philippines)

== In science ==
- Tabon, the native name of the Philippine megapode
- Tabon Man, several hominid remains found in the Paleolithic Tabon Caves archaeological site of Palawan
- Tabon-tabon, the Visayan name of the tree Atuna excelsa subsp. racemosa

== Other uses ==
- Tabon M. Estrella National High School, a public high school in Bislig, Surigao del Sur
