= ASCB =

ASCB may refer to:

- Accreditation Service For Certifying Bodies (Europe)
- Address Space Control Block
- Advertising Standards Complaints Board
- American Society for Cell Biology
- Andres Soriano Colleges of Bislig
- Army Sports Control Board
- Associação dos Servidores Civis do Brasil (Association of Civil Servants in Brazil)
