= Recaredo Castillo of Bislig City High School =

Private high school in Surigao del Sur, Philippines

Recaredo Castillo of Bislig City High School Inc.
- Former names: Bislig College Incorporated; Bislig Bay College; Recaredo Castillo College
- Motto: "An Institution of Excellence and Quality Education"
- Type: Private, Nonsectarian, Co-ed
- Established: 1967
- Location: Purok 2, Gamaon District, Mangagoy, Bislig, Surigao del Sur, Philippines; 8°11′02″N 126°20′54″E
- Campus: one campus, urban
- Principal: Mr. Ronald J. Daytutos
- Nicknames: RCCnians, RCBCnians
- Website: www.rcbcportal.page.link/home
- Location in Mindanao Location in the Philippines

Recaredo Castillo of Bislig City High School Inc. (RCBCHSI), formerly Recaredo Castillo College (RCC), is a private educational institution established in 1967. It is located in Gamaon District, Mangagoy, Bislig, Surigao del Sur in the Philippines. The school is named after Recaredo Castillo, former mayor of Bislig. It offers junior high school, senior high school, TESDA-accredited vocational courses and previously elementary school and college courses.

== Footnotes ==
- http://www.bislig.gov.ph/content_links.php?submenu_id=57&menu_id=3&subcategory_id=6
- http://www.bislig.gov.ph/news_list_public.php?news_id=12
