= San Jose National High School (Bislig) =

Public high school in Surigao del Sur, Philippines

Coordinates: 8°07′12″N 126°17′43″E

San Jose National High School is a national high school in Bislig, Surigao del Sur, Philippines.

== Background ==
San Jose National High School Annex of Bislig, Surigao del Sur was created through the effort of the former Barangay Captain and his council of Barangay San Jose of Bislig. As newly opened school, the Barangay Council offered the Barangay Cultural Center as her first school site starting school year 2001-2002.

Geographically, the school is located at Southern Part of Bislig, famous with its delicious durian and high grade coal, with land area of 2.953 hectares. It is 19 kilometer away from Bislig city proper.

San Jose National High School in its twelfth year as a learning institution is managed by Teacher Rod Deiparine as the School Head. The Faculty and Staff are composed of the following: Teacher Myra Samaco- Grade 7 adviser, Teacher Jocelle Banares -Grade 8 adviser, Teacher Lilibeth Francisco - third year adviser and Teacher Clarissa Feliscuzo - fourth year adviser. Teacher Almie Cabilin is the Technology and Livelihood Education subject teacher. Teacher Jhun Rino Betinol the Open High School Program Adviser. Teacher Maria Corazon Pelenio-subject teacher/School librarian.

The majority of the students have to hike three (3) to six (6) kilometers just to reach the school. Some dropped from class due to the absence of regular transportation. However through the help of Surigao del Sur Development and Improvement Program, the school has survived to reach the targeted 2% increase of Mean Percentage Score of National Achievement Test every end of the school year. SEDIP has implemented Drop Out Reduction Plan and provided us with Science Laboratory; Technology and Home Economics; and, Industrial Arts equipment.

San Jose National High School is a recipient of Ischool Project and Gilas Foundation. The school has now nineteen work station desktop computers, one server computer and one laptop computer, and WIT Broadband Star internet connection.

The School has one (1) building with one classroom and computer room, one (1) Science Laboratory building, Library building with Faculty Room; and, Principal's Office and Guidance Office Building, and one (1) Industrial Arts building awarded by Surigao del Sur Development and Improvement Program (SEDIP) in cooperation with the LGU of Bislig.

The school look forward for a benevolent donors for additional one unit classroom and for more books for a better student's performance.

Source: Annual Improvement Plan 2010 of San Jose National High School, San Jose, Bislig
