= Bislig =

Component city in Surigao del Sur, Philippines

- Component city
- City of Bislig
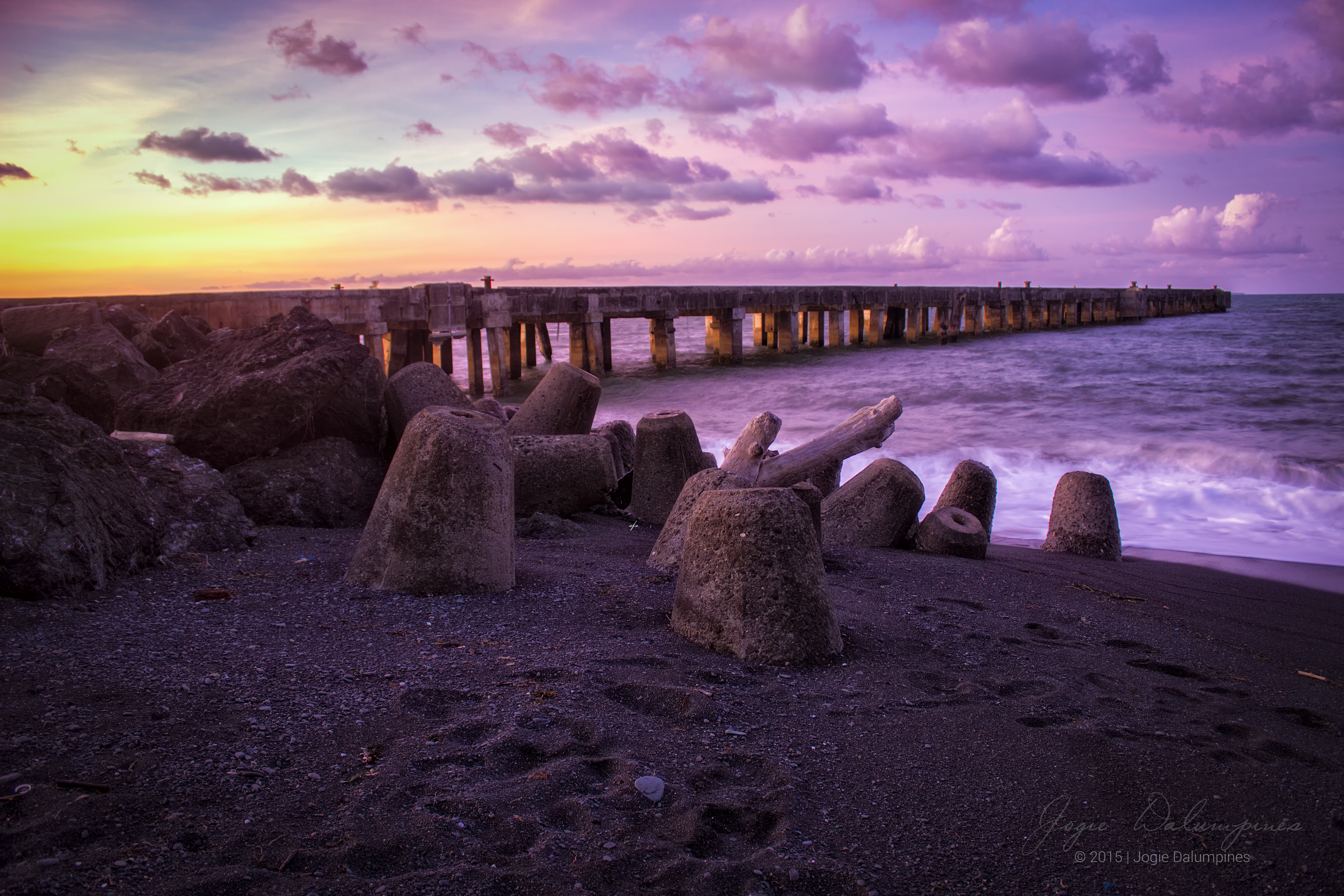
- PICOP Pier Uno

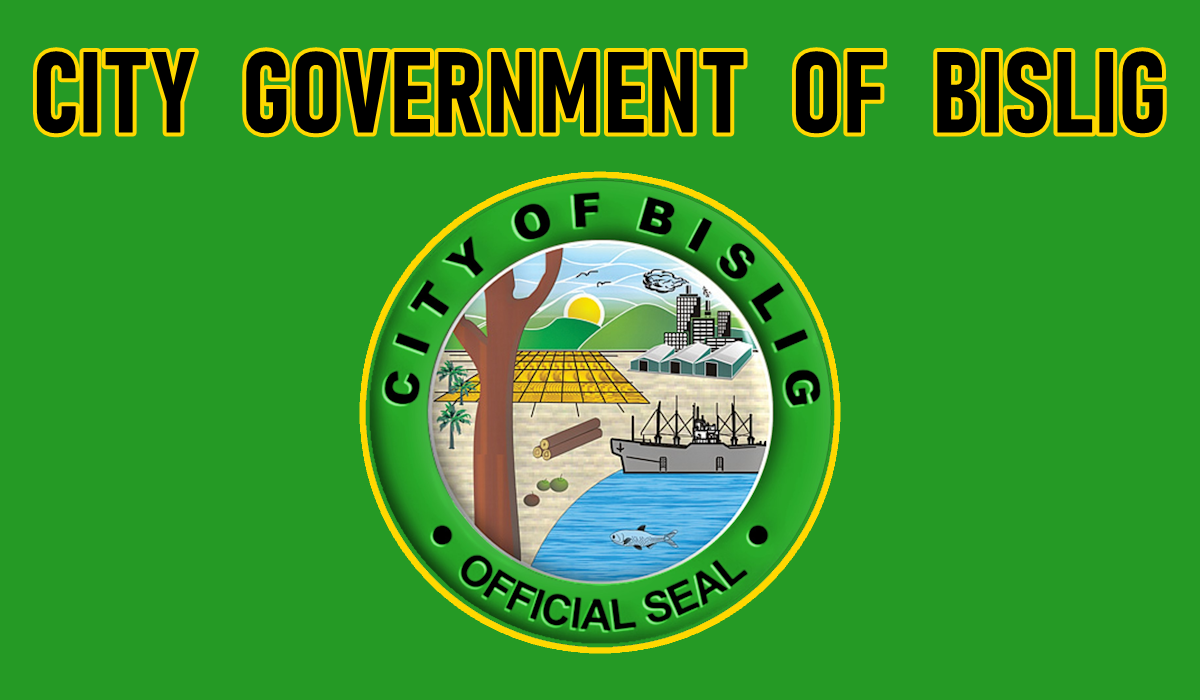
- Flag Seal
- Nicknames: "The Organic City of the Philippines" "The Booming City by the Bay" "The City of Wonders"
- Motto: Sulig Bislig!
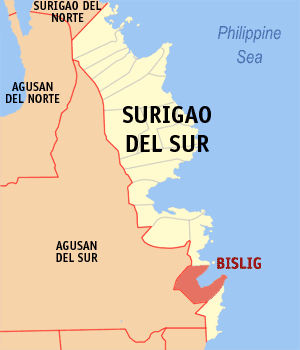
- Map of Surigao del Sur with Bislig highlighted
- Interactive map of Bislig
- Location within the Philippines
- Coordinates: 8°12′48″N 126°18′58″E
- Country: Philippines
- Region: Caraga
- Province: Surigao del Sur
- District: 2nd district
- Founded: January 1, 1921
- Cityhood: September 18, 2000
- Barangays: 24 (see Barangays)

Government
  - Type: Sangguniang Panlungsod
  - Mayor: Florencio C. Garay
  - Vice Mayor: Conrad C. Cejoco
  - Representative: Alexander T. Pimentel
  - City Council: Members: Pedrito R. Sulapas; Edgar B. Corvera; Victor B. Alvar Jr.; Soriano R. Casas; David K. Salazar Sr.; Jenny Myrr V. Chicano; Bernadeth May Almanon-Balondo; Mario S. Alvizo; Winston W. Sia; Reynaldo V. Dominguez
  - Electorate: 72,369 voters (2025)

Area
  - Total: 331.80 km^{2} (128.11 sq mi)
- Elevation: 71 m (233 ft)
- Highest elevation: 394 m (1,293 ft)
- Lowest elevation: 0 m (0 ft)

Population (2024 census)
  - Total: 99,872
  - Density: 301.00/km^{2} (779.59/sq mi)
  - Households: 24,348
- Demonym: Bisliganon

Economy
  - Income class: 2nd city income class
  - Poverty incidence: 13.35% (2023)
  - Revenue: ₱ 1,140 million (2024)
  - Assets: ₱ 2,860 million (2024)
  - Expenditure: ₱ 350.1 million (2024)
  - Liabilities: ₱ 1,004 million (2024)

Service provider
  - Electricity: Surigao del Sur 1 Electric Cooperative (SURSECO 1)
- Time zone: UTC+08:00 (PST)
- ZIP code: 8311
- PSGC: 166803000
- IDD : area code: +63 (0)86
- Spoken languages: Mindanao Cebuano, Bisliganon Kamayo, Filipino, and other minority languages
- Website: https://bislig.gov.ph/

Bislig, officially the City of Bislig (Cebuano: Dakbayan sa Bislig; Filipino: Lungsod ng Bislig), is a component city in the province of Surigao del Sur, Philippines. According to the 2024 census, it has a population of 99,872 people.

In 2000, Bislig was converted into a city per Republic Act 8804. It is the most populous among the cities and municipalities in the province of Surigao del Sur.

Barangay Mangagoy, the downtown area often dubbed by its residents as "the little city within the city", is the center of trade and industry of Bislig which has a population of 32,464 as of the 2015 estimate. It is the largest barangay in the city and the entire province of Surigao del Sur in terms of population. Since Barangay Poblacion is often referred by the locals simply as 'Bislig', Mangagoy on the other hand is often mistaken as a separate town though it is only just one out of the 24 barangays that comprises the entire City of Bislig.

Bislig is geographically the easternmost city of the Philippines. The city serves as the center of trade and commerce in the province of Surigao del Sur.

== Etymology ==
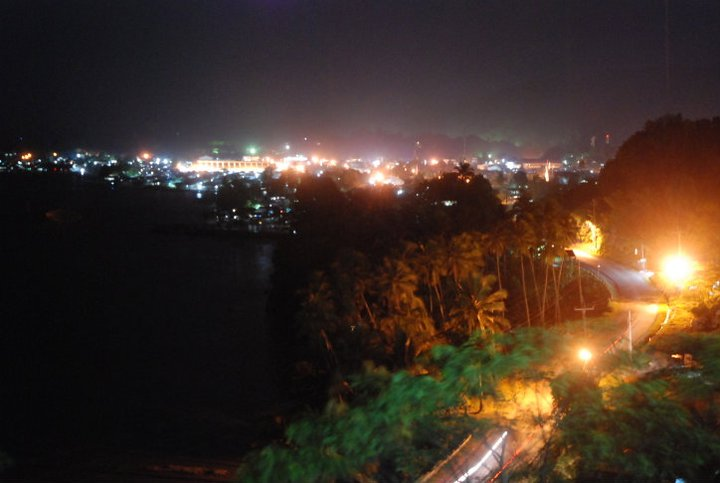
Skyline of Bislig on night time showing the nearby Bislig Bay taken at the Ocean View Park in Barangay Comawas

The legendary allusions as to how Bislig got its name could be traced back to the era prior to the coming of the Spanish conquistadors. The town got its name from a forest vine of the rattan family that grew in abundance along the banks of its rivers. This vine was noted for its strength and became known for saving a royal couple who crossed the swollen river in one of their hunting expeditions and who almost died as they were carried downstream by the rushing current. The legend has it that these hunters had already lost hope of surviving until they were able to cling to a vine which was about 1/4 inch in diameter called Bislig. As a sign of thanksgiving, the ruler named this place Bislig.

Historically, Bislig derived its name from the word "bizlin", a kind of gold, "which is worth two pesos a tael. The weight of a tael is one and one-eight ounces" in the 16th century, which the natives used for trade and barter. Prior to the coming of Spaniards, this terminology was understood in Luzon and in Mindanao. In the report of the Administrator of Royal Properties Andres Mirandaola dated September 8, 1573, sent to King Philip of Spain that "much gold found in the island of Mindanao, District of Butuan, Surigao ..." It is believed that this kind of gold found in the rolling hills and mountains of the southernmost portion of Bislig and Agusan Province.

However, historical records shows that the name has been variously spelled by the Spanish chroniclers. Conquistador Miguel de Loarca, in his extreme exploratory survey trip of the archipelago, first mentioned and spelled it "Beslin" in his historical accounts "Relacion de los Yslas Filipinas" in 1582, as well as in the Confirmaciones de Encomienda (1616–1700) which Bislig was under the encomienda of Alferez Juan delas Marianas in 1619. In the "Historia general de los religiosos descalzos del orden de San Agustin" of Fray Andres de San Nicolas in 1664 spelled it "Bislin" and also in the "Historia general... del Orden de San Agustin" of Fray Luis de Jesus in 1681. A Franciscan writer, Fray Juan de San Francisco de San Antonio spelled it "Baslig" in his "Cronicas" in 1738. Other Spanish chroniclers spelled it "Bislic" and "Bisliq".

In the first detailed map of the Philippines in 1749, published in "Historia de la Provincia de Filipinas" by a Jesuit, Father Pedro Murillo Velarde spelled it Bislig, as did in the "Historia General ..." of Fray Pedro San Francisco de Assis in 1768 and in the "Mapa dela Provincia de Caraga" by Francisco Alegre in 1751. A complete statistical data of District of Caraga compiled in 1750 spelled as "Bislig", and also in the document titled "Provincia de San Nicolas de Tolentino de Agustinos descalzos dela Congregacion de España y Indias" in 1879.

From the time on, it is known and spelled as Bislig.

== Geography ==
Bislig is approximately 208 kilometres (129 mi) northeast of Davao City, 152 kilometres (94 mi) south of Tandag City (the provincial capital), 44 kilometres (27 mi) south of Hinatuan (adjacent town), and 158 kilometres (98 mi) southeast of Butuan.

Bislig has a land area of 40,503 hectares spread over 24 barangays, with close to half, which are tropical rainforests, is classified as "public forest".

=== Climate ===
Climate data for Bislig
Month	Jan	Feb	Mar	Apr	May	Jun	Jul	Aug	Sep	Oct	Nov	Dec	Year
Mean daily maximum °C (°F)	29.3 (84.7)	29.3 (84.7)	30.2 (86.4)	31.1 (88.0)	31.7 (89.1)	31.6 (88.9)	31.6 (88.9)	31.9 (89.4)	32.0 (89.6)	31.7 (89.1)	31.1 (88.0)	30.1 (86.2)	31.0 (87.8)
Daily mean °C (°F)	25.6 (78.1)	25.5 (77.9)	26.1 (79.0)	26.8 (80.2)	27.4 (81.3)	27.1 (80.8)	27.0 (80.6)	27.2 (81.0)	27.2 (81.0)	27.2 (81.0)	26.7 (80.1)	26.2 (79.2)	26.7 (80.0)
Mean daily minimum °C (°F)	21.9 (71.4)	21.8 (71.2)	22.1 (71.8)	22.6 (72.7)	23.1 (73.6)	22.7 (72.9)	22.5 (72.5)	22.6 (72.7)	22.5 (72.5)	22.7 (72.9)	22.4 (72.3)	22.3 (72.1)	22.4 (72.4)
Average rainfall mm (inches)	710 (28.0)	531 (20.9)	456 (18.0)	340 (13.4)	272 (10.7)	214 (8.4)	183 (7.2)	171 (6.7)	184 (7.2)	213 (8.4)	320 (12.6)	604 (23.8)	4,198 (165.3)
Source: Climate-Data.org

Bislig has a tropical rainforest climate (Af) with heavy to very heavy rainfall year-round and with extremely heavy rainfall in January.

=== Barangays ===
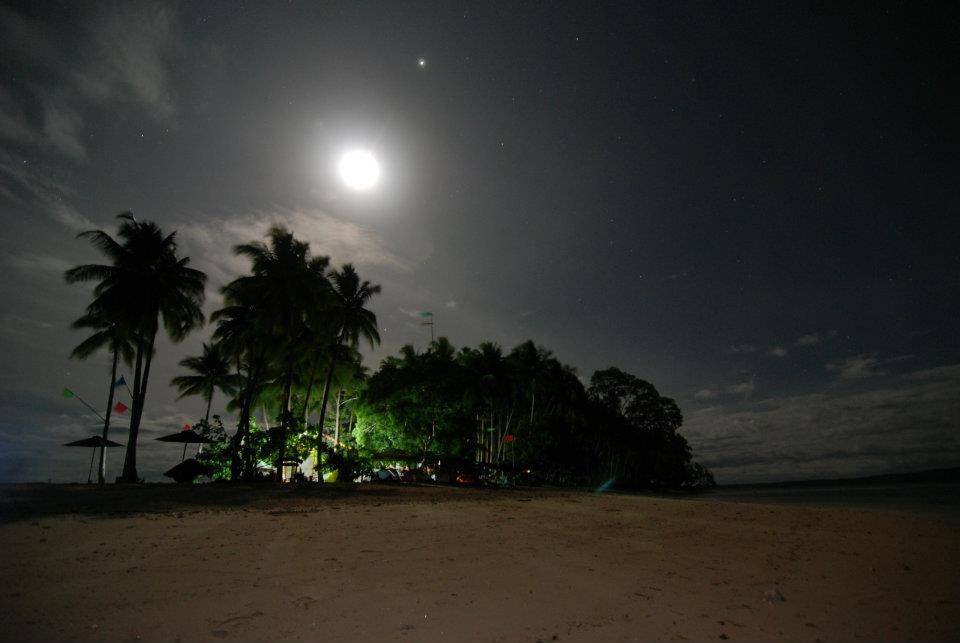
Hagonoy Island during night time

Bislig is politically subdivided into 24 barangays. Each barangay consists of puroks while some have sitios.

- Bucto
- Burboanan
- Caguyao
- Coleto
- Comawas
- Kahayag
- Labisma
- Lawigan
- Maharlika
- Mangagoy (City Downtown)
- Mone
- Pamanlinan
- Pamaypayan
- Poblacion (Bislig Proper – Seat of the City Government)
- San Antonio
- San Fernando
- San Isidro (Bagnan)
- San Jose
- San Roque (Cadanglasan)
- San Vicente
- Santa Cruz
- Sibaroy
- Tabon
- Tumanan

== History ==
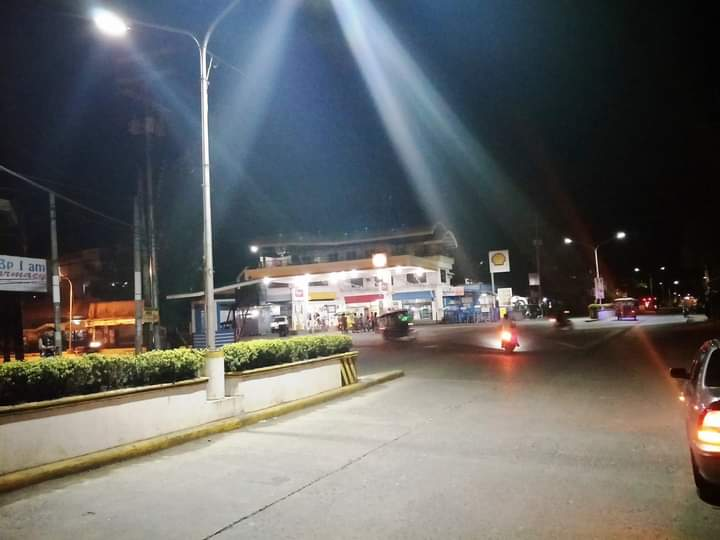
Andres Soriano Avenue

The first inhabitants of Bislig were believed to have come from the Agusan Valley in the hinterlands of Mindanao beyond the Magdiwata Mountains. These people used spears, bows and arrows and lived a semi-nomadic life and were called Manobos.

They were ruled during the later part of the seventeenth century by a native leader called "Bagani", meaning a formidable leader. They were very brave, tough and war-like. They also introduced edible crops such as rice, corn and rootcrops to the area.

At the turn of the century, Spanish colonizers and missionaries imposed the rule of Spain and brought with them Tagalogs, Ilonggos, and Cebuanos from the north as members of their expeditionary forces.

Long before it became a town on January 1, 1921, per Executive Order No. 62 issued by Governor General Francis Burton Harrison on December 28, 1920 (with Primitivo A. Castillo as its first Municipal President, Vice-president: Sulpicio P. Laurente & Councilors: Ciriaco Alba; Bartolome Alvar; Higino Basañez; Escolastico Carmen; Tomas Masancay; Basilio Dua; and Macario Tenchavez), Bislig was already an established political instrumentality or "pueblo" in the Province of Surigao (now Surigao del Sur and Surigao del Norte). Earlier, the province was a part of an even bigger territory stretching from northeastern Mindanao down to the island's southeastern "pueblo" of Caraga and Man-ay in Davao Oriental. Caraga was originally the seat of political, military and religious authority.

Following its becoming a town, efforts were made to improve and develop Bislig until the advent of its citihood campaign in 1999; and by virtue of Republic Act No. 8804, Bislig was converted into a component city. This was duly ratified and approved in a plebiscite conducted on September 18, 2000.

== Demographics ==
Population census of Bislig
Year	Pop.	±% p.a.
1903	2,165	—
1939	4,840	+2.26%
1948	5,019	+0.40%
1960	16,409	+10.37%
1970	40,405	+9.42%
1975	45,458	+2.39%
1980	81,615	+12.41%
1990	103,510	+2.41%
1995	103,668	+0.03%
2000	97,860	−1.23%
2007	102,009	+0.57%
2010	96,578	−1.97%
2015	94,535	−0.41%
2020	99,290	+1.04%
2024	99,872	+0.14%
Source: Philippine Statistics Authority

A local language, called Kamayo is sometimes used by the residents, though they usually use the more general Cebuano language of the region.

== Economy ==
Poverty incidence of Bislig (%)

Source: Philippine Statistics Authority

Bislig is the largest city on the eastern coast of Mindanao. Situated between Mati in the south and Surigao City in the north, it serves as a commercial center for Surigao del Sur and northern Davao Oriental. It is also accessible by road from the landlocked municipalities of Agusan del Sur and Davao de Oro. It markets itself as a center of organic high-value crops and aquamarine products.

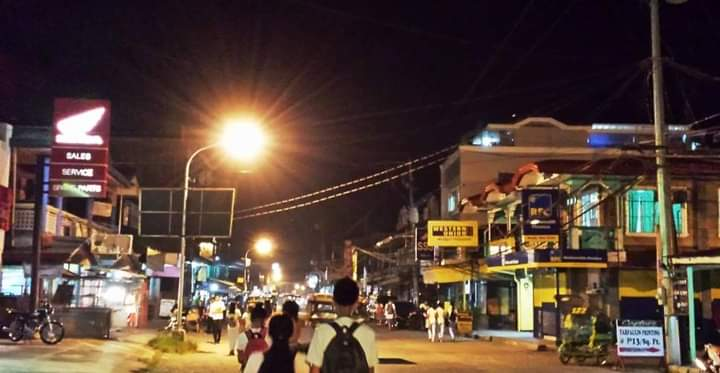
Espiritu Street

Barangay Mangagoy is the center of trade and industry of the city which has a population of roughly 50,000 and is the largest barangay in population in the entire province of Surigao del Sur. Espiritu Street and the adjacent areas is colloquially often referred simply to as 'Barrio' by the locals. It is where most of commercial activity in Mangagoy is located. It houses national and local banks, restaurants, and service centers. There are also accommodating inns and hotels, as well as motorized tricycles, jeepneys, and buses ply its concrete roads and highways.

Bislig was the location of the defunct company PICOP Resources, Inc. (PRI, or previously known as the Paper Industries Corporation of the Philippines), which was the largest paper mill in Asia and one of the largest in the world. Established in 1963, it was involved in both logging (raw material extraction) and paper & pulp manufacturing, one of the first companies in the world to feature this integrated approach to paper & pulp production. PICOP attracted workers from around the country and helped boost Bislig's population, converting the then-sleepy outskirt barangay of Mangagoy into a boomtown. PICOP's forest concessions extended into Barangay Tabon and included an area where the Philippine eagle lived. The company reached its peak in 1984. However, during the late 1980s the company started to falter caused by several issues, with political turmoil and mismanagement, to name a few. PICOP began to mount losses and in a couple of decades, concluded operations. It ended operations in 2001 and completely shut down by 2008. The closure caused massive problems in Bislig, whose local economy was deeply intertwined with the company.

In a televised press conference aired by the Presidential Communications in September 2020, construction firm JM McGregor Haggens, Inc. announced that they will be embarking in a multi-billion peso port complex in Bislig to be called "The Maritime City", the first of its kind in the country. The hub will consist of at least 15 projects, including an oil refinery, oil depot, shipyard, container port, cold storage, food processing plant, power plant, water treatment facility, hospital, hotel, integrated market, convention center, and a government center. The first phase of construction is scheduled in early 2021. The said project will be funded by Aria Indonesia-Aria Asset Management of Luxembourg and nine other entities from different countries.

== Tourism ==
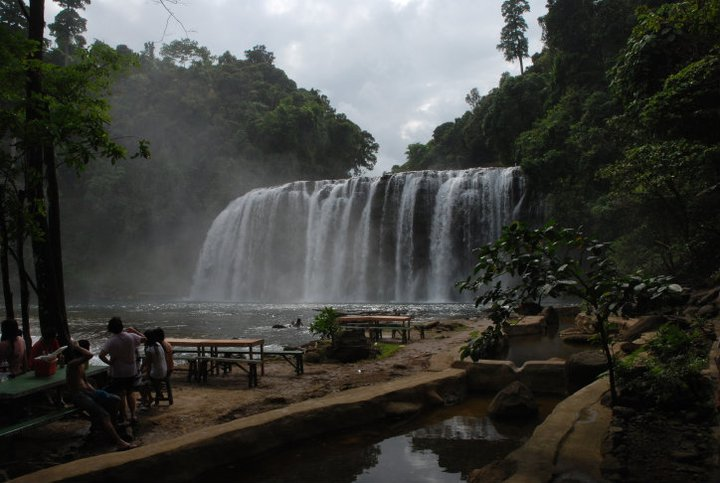
Tinuy-an Falls

Known for its ecotourism, Bislig's main tourist attraction is the Tinuy-an Falls, known as the little "Niagara Falls" of the Philippines. It is a white water curtain that flows in three levels about 55 meters high and 95 meters wide. It once appeared in the International Travel Magazine for its unique natural formation. It is also said to be the widest waterfall in the Philippines.

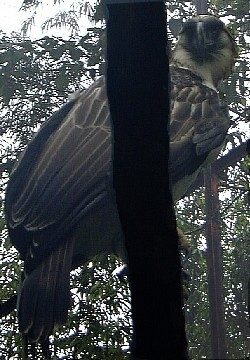
A Philippine eagle found in the city's wild sanctuary.

Other known tourist attractions include: the white-sand beaches of Hagonoy Island; the various white sand beaches in Barangay Lawigan facing and considered a part of the Pacific Ocean; the underground river of the educational Delot and Hinayagan Cave; the Togonan Falls in Barangay Sibaroy which is a 30-minute ride a far from the city proper; the wild sanctuary of the Forester's Park; the wide range waters of the Mone River and the man-made Lake 77 which offers a boat ride tour and a floating cottage ideal for picnic and fishing; the Kamayo Heritage Park; the Cawa-Cawa Sa Awog; the Sian Falls; the Bislig Hot Spring; the Florland Inland Resort in Barangay San Vicente; the Maria Regina Highland Farm and Resort in Dao-Dao, Barangay San Fernando; the Chocolate Beach ideal for the avid mud skim boarding enthusiasts; the newly developed Mabakat beach (the former Dampingan area) ideal for surfing aficionados; the International Doll House at the Ocean View Park in Barangay Comawas; and the City Baywalk Park. Trekking and bird watching could also be available in Bislig's densely natural forested areas.

Bislig hosts an annual festival called "The Karawasan Festival" during the charter day of the city which features an inter-school ethnic dance competition. Karawasan came from a local dialect which means "movement of the crabs". Karawasan is held every 17th day of September. It was replaced by the "Tinuy-an (Sayaw) Festival" since September 2013 and reinstated in 2019.

=== Festivals and events ===
- Tinuy-an Sayaw Festival : Bislig's major festival celebrated every September 17. It is the city's co-major event along with the Karawasan Festival.
- Charter Day Celebration : Celebrated from September 16 to 18, the city celebrate its cityhood.
- Mangagoy Fiesta : Celebrated every July 19, the feast day of St. Vincent de Paul.
- Sinulog Festival : Celebrated every third Sunday of January during the feast of Santo Niño.
- Kawadang Festival : Celebrated every September 21, four days after the Karawasan Festival.
- Poblacion Fiesta : Celebrated every September 22, the feast day of Santo Tomas de Villanueva.
- Uli Bislig : Celebrated every September 16, it literally means "going back home to Bislig".
- Karawasan Festival : As part of the Charter Day Celebration, a dream come true for the City Government of Bislig. Karawasan is a festival of ethnic dances depicting the movement of crabs. Karawasan is actually a collective name given to the member of the crab family found to be great in the salty and freshwater of Bislig. The lavishness of such local marine resource has, in fact, made Bislig known to other places in the country. It was replaced by the "Tinuy-an Sayaw Festival" until it was reinstated in 2019.

== Transportation ==
=== By land ===
There are buses from Bachelor Express that goes there from Butuan City, Cagayan de Oro City, and Davao City.

=== By air ===
The concrete runway of Bislig Airport can accommodate light commercial planes of the Fokker 50 class, though most of the time the airport is only used for the occasional private plane.

Private and government charter planes and choppers still usually land at the airport.

=== By sea ===
The city had developed sea ports at Barangay Lawigan and Caramcam District in Barangay Mangagoy for the increasing demand of people travelling to other provinces. Currently, operations of the Lawigan sea port is placed on hold due to project constraints.

== Healthcare ==
- Andres Soriano Memorial Hospital Cooperative (Private)
- Babano Family Medical Clinic – Hospital Inc. (Private)
- Bislig District Hospital (Government)
- HealthLink Medical Clinic and Laboratory (Private)
- Saint Vincent de Paul College Maternity & General Hospital (Private) (on indefinite hiatus; for redevelopment)

== Education ==
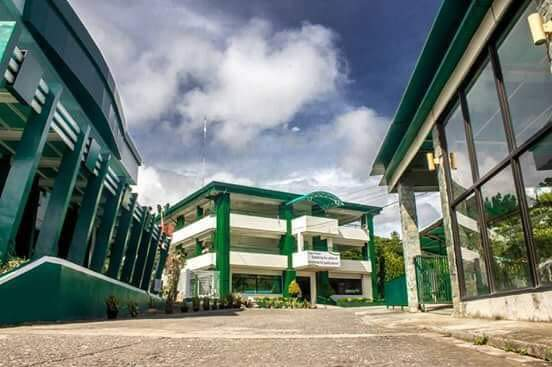
De La Salle John Bosco College

Private schools:

- De La Salle John Bosco College
- STIP Pacific View College Inc.
- Andres Soriano Colleges of Bislig
- St. Vincent de Paul Diocesan College
- Recaredo Castillo of Bislig City High School

Public schools:

- Secondary
  - Mangagoy National High School
  - Bislig City National High School
  - Coleto Integrated School
  - Danipas National High School
  - Labisma Integrated School
  - Lawigan National High School
  - Tabon M. Estrella National High School
  - Maharlika National High School
  - Mone National High School
  - San Isidro National High School
  - San Jose National High School
  - San Vicente National High School
  - Sikahoy National High School
  - Mabog National High School
  - Santa Cruz National High School
  - Bucto National High School
  - Tumanan National High School
- Tertiary
  - North Eastern Mindanao State University - Bislig Campus (formerly a satellite campus of University of Southeastern Philippines)
  - Bislig City, Surigao del Sur - District II Skills Training Center

== Notable personalities ==
- Marcelito Pomoy – singer and Pilipinas Got Talent (season 2) Grand Winner and America's Got Talent: The Champions finalist
- Gabriel Amigo III – international Enduro mountain bike racing champion
- Dennis Orcollo – professional pool player; Billiard Congress of America Hall of Fame inductee
