= Tabon M. Estrella National High School =

Public high school in Surigao del Sur, Philippines

Tabon Maximino Estrella National High School

Location
- Bislig, Surigao del Sur; Philippines
- Coordinates: 8°10′54″N 126°21′43″E

Information
- Former names: Tabon M. Estrella Barangay High School
- Type: Public, Technical-Vocational
- Established: 1981
- Principal: Romil B. Vestudio
- Enrollment: 2,120 (School Year 2022-2023)
- Campus: Sugala St., Waray-Waray, Brgy. Tabon
- Colors: Green; Pink
- Hymn: TMENHS Hymn

Tabon M. Estrella National High School (TMENHS) is a public, technical-vocational high school institution located in Purok 4A, Sugala Street, Waray-Waray, Barangay Tabon, Bislig, Surigao del Sur, Philippines. It has 2 Campuses (Sugala Campus and Waray-waray Campus). It is categorized as a Mega-Large School. Having an enrollment of 2, 120 as of 2023.

== History ==
The school was established through the enactment of Barangay Resolution No. 13, series of 1980, initiated by the Barangay Council of Tabon, headed by the late Barangay Captain Adelio G. Plaza. It started its operation as a barangay high school in the school year 1981 – 1982.

== Academics ==
TMENHS provides courses for both the elementary and secondary levels.

== Student publication ==
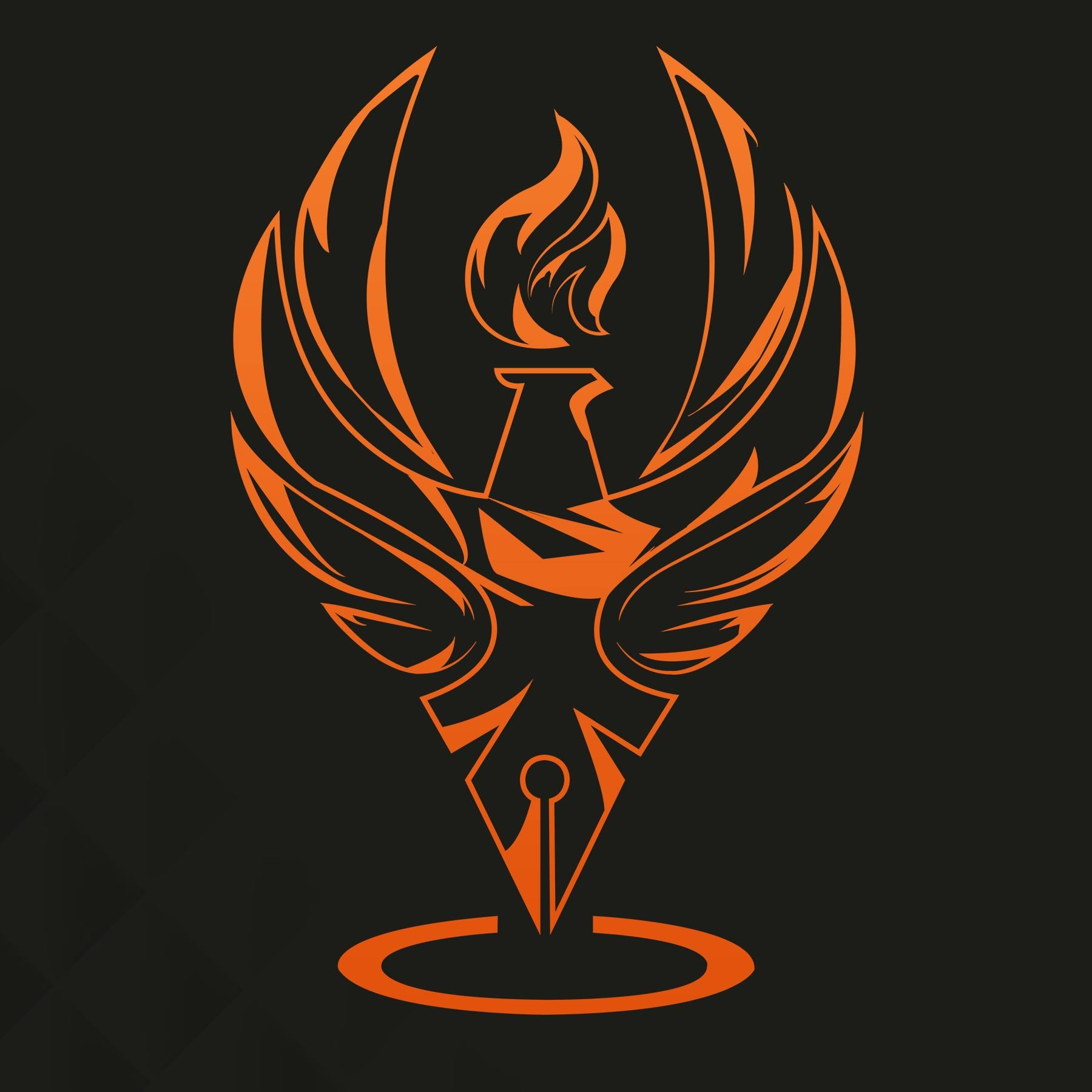
The Tabonian is the institution's authorized insignia and the title of its official periodical.

The official student newspaper of the TMENHS is called The Tabonian (Filipino: Ang Suhay). With student funding, management, and writing, it distributes publications and other printed items.
