= Gabriel Amigo III =

Filipino Enduro mountain bike athlete (born 1991)

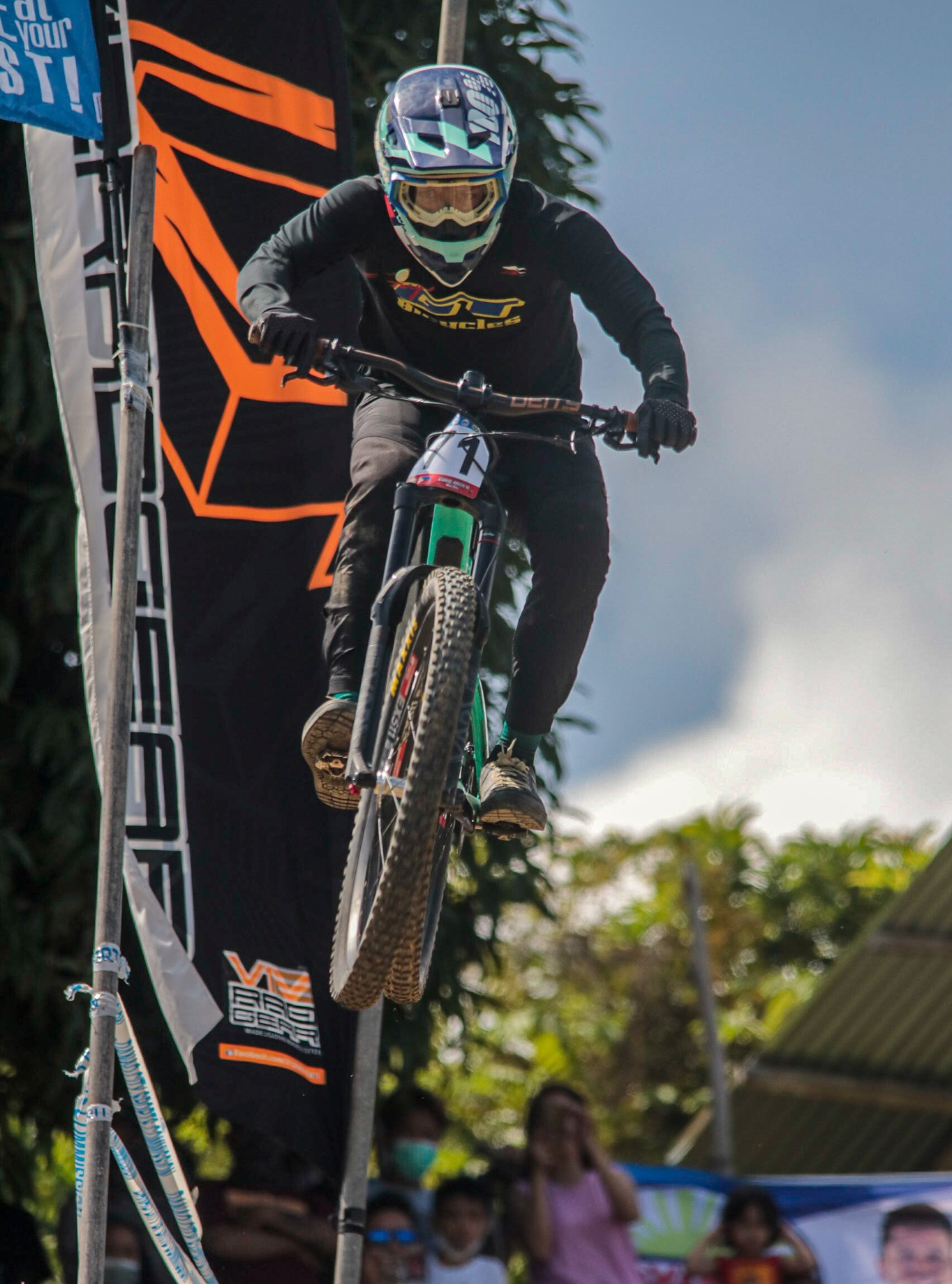

Personal information
- Born: 1 June 1991 (age 35) Bislig, Philippines
- Height: 5 ft 9 in (175 cm)
- Weight: 68 kg (150 lb)

Cycling career
- Sport: Cycling
- Current team: Pivot Bicycles Philippines, O'Neal Philippines
- Disciplines: Enduro; Mountain bike racing Downhill
- Role: Rider
- Rider type: Enduro / Downhill

Major wins
- (Australia) 1st Place Victorian Enduro Tour #4 - Albury, VIC 2023 (Australia) 1st Place Victorian Enduro Tour #3 - Bright, VIC 2023; 3rd Place UCI PH National DH Trials - Philippines 2021 (United Arab Emirates) 1st Place Fujairah Adventure Enduro - United Arab of Emirates 2019; 8th Place EWS Asia Pacific - Thailand 2019; 3rd Place Yakru Enduro - Nepal 2019; 1st Place Singapore Open Enduro - Singapore 2018; 1st Place UCI National Enduro - Philippines 2017; 1st Place Asian Enduro Series - Brunei 2017

Gabriel Amigo III (born 1 June 1991) is a Filipino Enduro mountain bike athlete who is currently residing in Bislig, Philippines.

== Career ==
He was crowned as the National Enduro Champion for men's elite category after winning the 2017 Philippine MTB Enduro National Championships held in Guimaras, Philippines. Amigo signed a contract with Norco Bicycles Philippines for Year 2017–2018, Trek Bicycles Philippines for Year 2018–2020, GT Bicycles Philippines for Year 2021-2023 and recently, he signed up with Pivot Bicycles Philippines and O'Neal Philippines for apparels.

He is the first Filipino elite rider who was able to compete at the 2019 Enduro World Series in Rotorua, New Zealand (Round 1) and Derby, Tasmania (Round 2). Currently he is ranked as 200th in the enduro world series standing and a qualified rider to represent for his country in the Enduro World Series - Trophy of Nations 2019 race in Finale Ligure, Italy.

Amigo snatched the 3rd place spot during 2021 UCI Philippine National Downhill Trials held in Danao City, Cebu last November 28, 2021.
