= Tinuy-an Falls =

Coordinates: 8°10′16″N 126°13′46″E

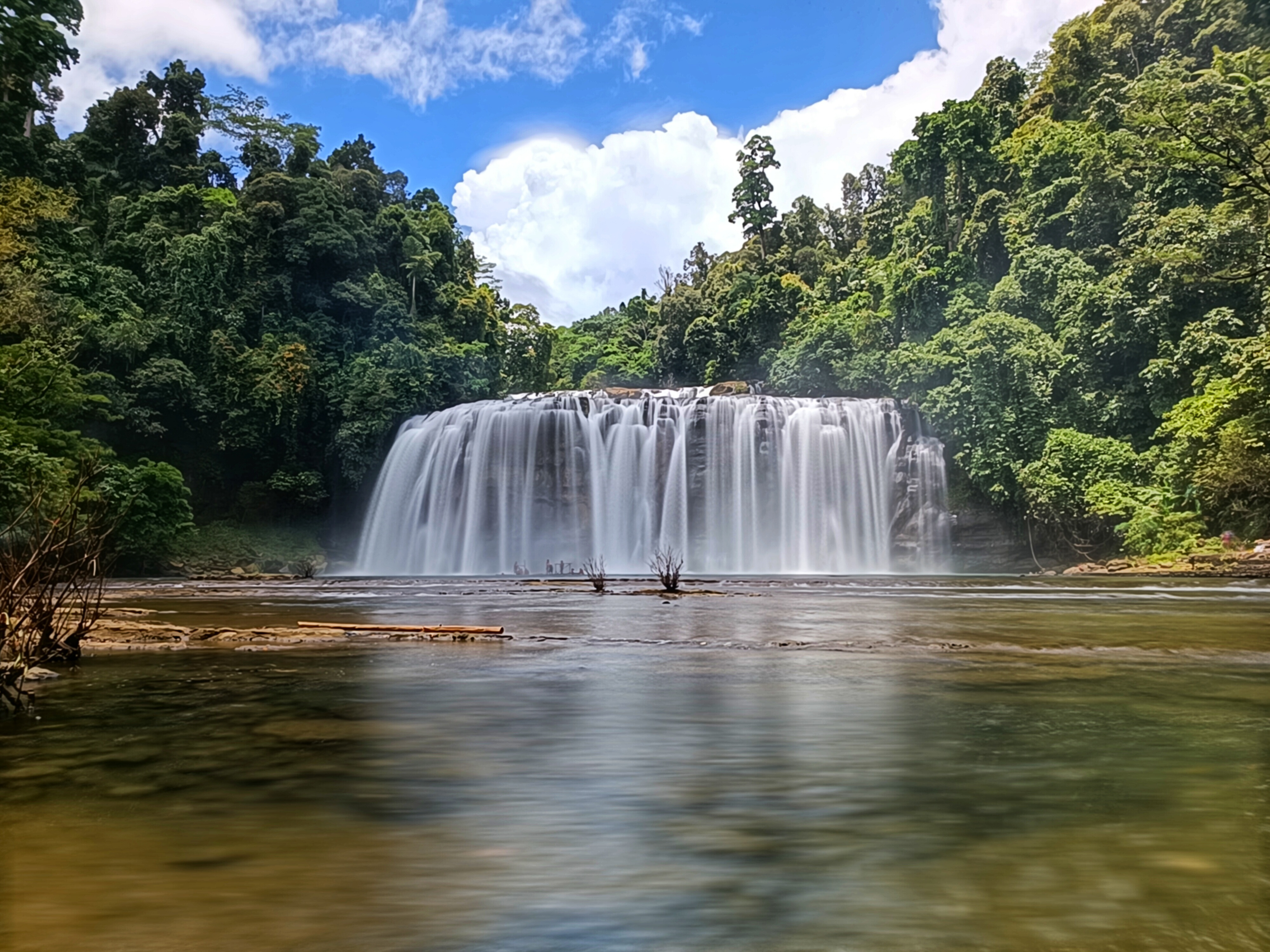
- The falls in 2022
- Interactive map of Tinuy-an Falls
- Location: Bislig, Mindanao, Philippines
- Type: Cascade
- Total height: 55 m (180.4 ft)
- Number of drops: 4
- Total width: 95 metres (312 ft)

Tinuy-an Falls is a multi-tiered waterfall in Bislig, Surigao del Sur in the southern island of Mindanao, Philippines. Bislig is a city known as the Booming City by the Bay. The waterfall itself has been featured in various international travel magazines and TV shows.

The Tinuy-an falls are 95 m wide and 55 metres (180 ft) high, touted as the little Niagara Falls of the Philippines. Tinuy-an is a white water curtain that flows in three levels (with a fourth tier hidden from view) and is said to be the widest waterfall in the Philippines. Every morning, the area shows a rainbow between 9 a.m. to 11 a.m. One may also ride a raft to get close to its cascades and get a water “massage.”

Tinuy-an Falls is a co-management effort between the tourism office of Bislig and the Manobo Tribal Council.

In 2024, birder Peter Kaestner spotted an Orange-Tufted Spiderhunter at the falls in a heliconia thicket. This was Kaestner's 10,000th different bird species, a new world record.

== Etymology ==
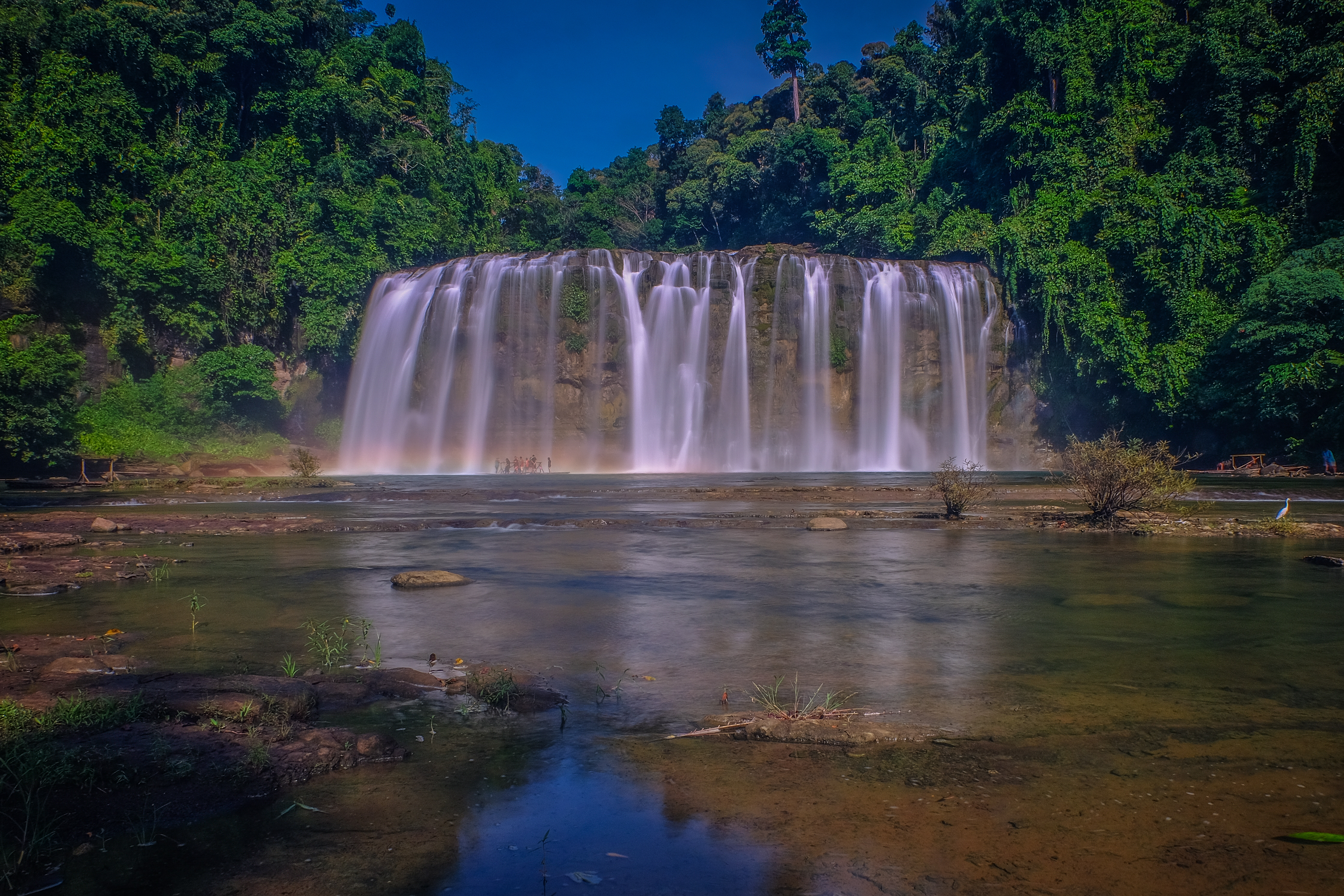
Tinuy-an Falls, June 2020

The name Tinuy-an comes from the word Tinuyo-an, a native Cebuano vernacular which means "intentional act or performance to attain an objective or goal". It can also be transliterated into the Filipino context as Babalik-balikan ("a place you’ll keep going back to").

== Legendary allusions ==
Legends says that long time ago, the people living on the Magdiwata Mountain were turned into slaves by tribesmen from Agusan. These tribesmen were so cruel and did not treat the slaves humanely, forcing them to do very difficult tasks. Eventually, the slaves felt tired of their abusive masters, they planned on attaining their freedom. While they were rowing the gakit (bamboo raft), the slaves jumped into the water and forcefully pushed the gakit towards the waterfalls, consequently killing their masters, and ultimately attaining their freedom. This action of the slaves were planned, or intended, hence, the name of the waterfalls.

== Geography ==
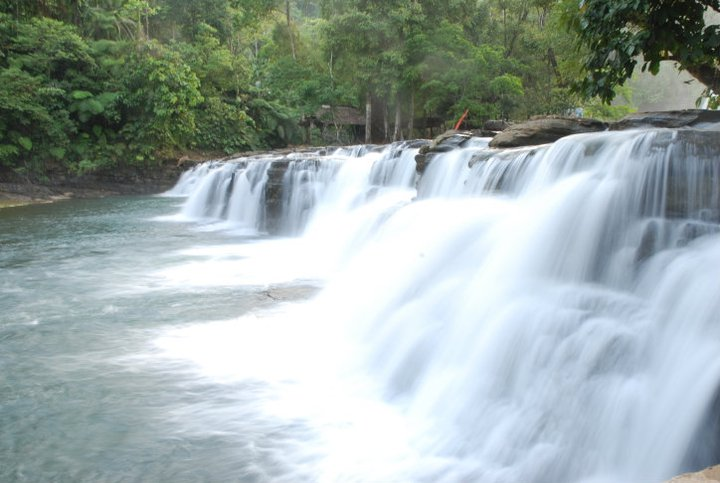
The Tinuy-an Falls water curtain from the first tier

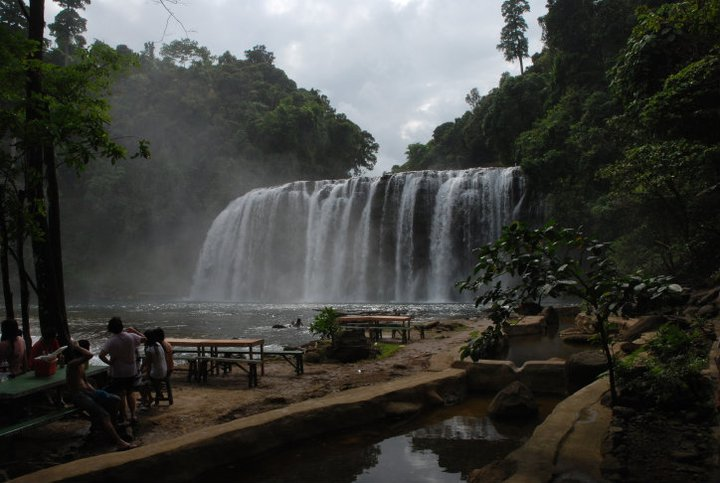
A view of the falls showing the second tier, circa 2011

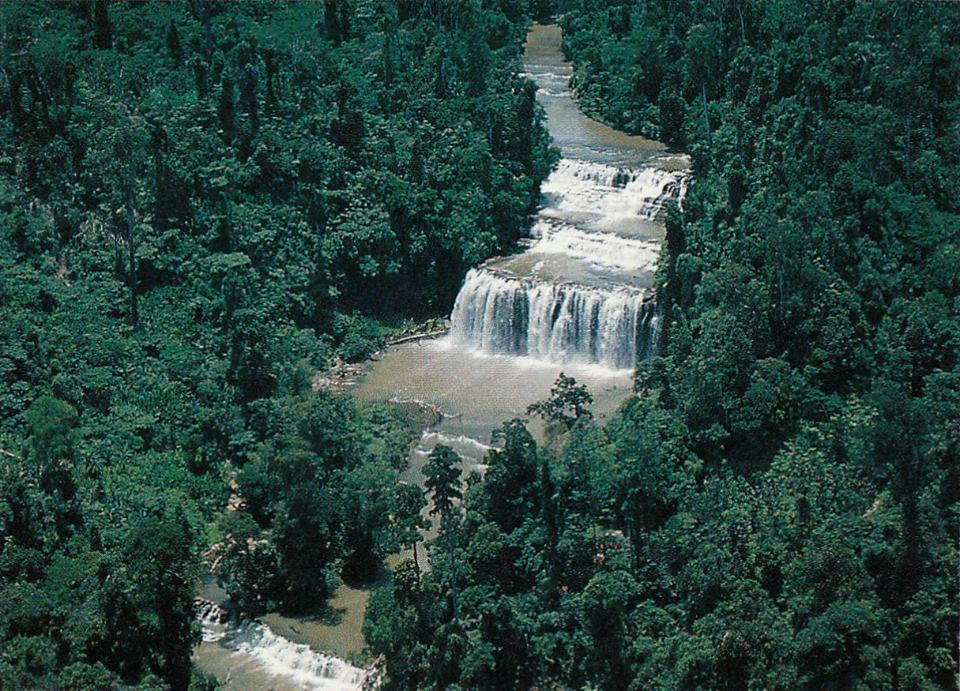
Aerial view of Tinuy-an Falls circa 1990s showing its entire fall tiers or levels

Tinuy-an Falls is located in Barangay Burboanan, a one-hour ride from Barangay Mangagoy, centre of trade and commerce in Bislig, via the Poblacion-San Isidro (Bagnan) route. The falls plunges 55 metres (180 ft) high from the top of the three tiered cascading waterfalls.

== See also ==
- List of waterfalls
- Bislig
- Surigao del Sur
