= 2025 Davao Oriental earthquakes =

M7.4 and M6.7–6.8 doublet earthquake

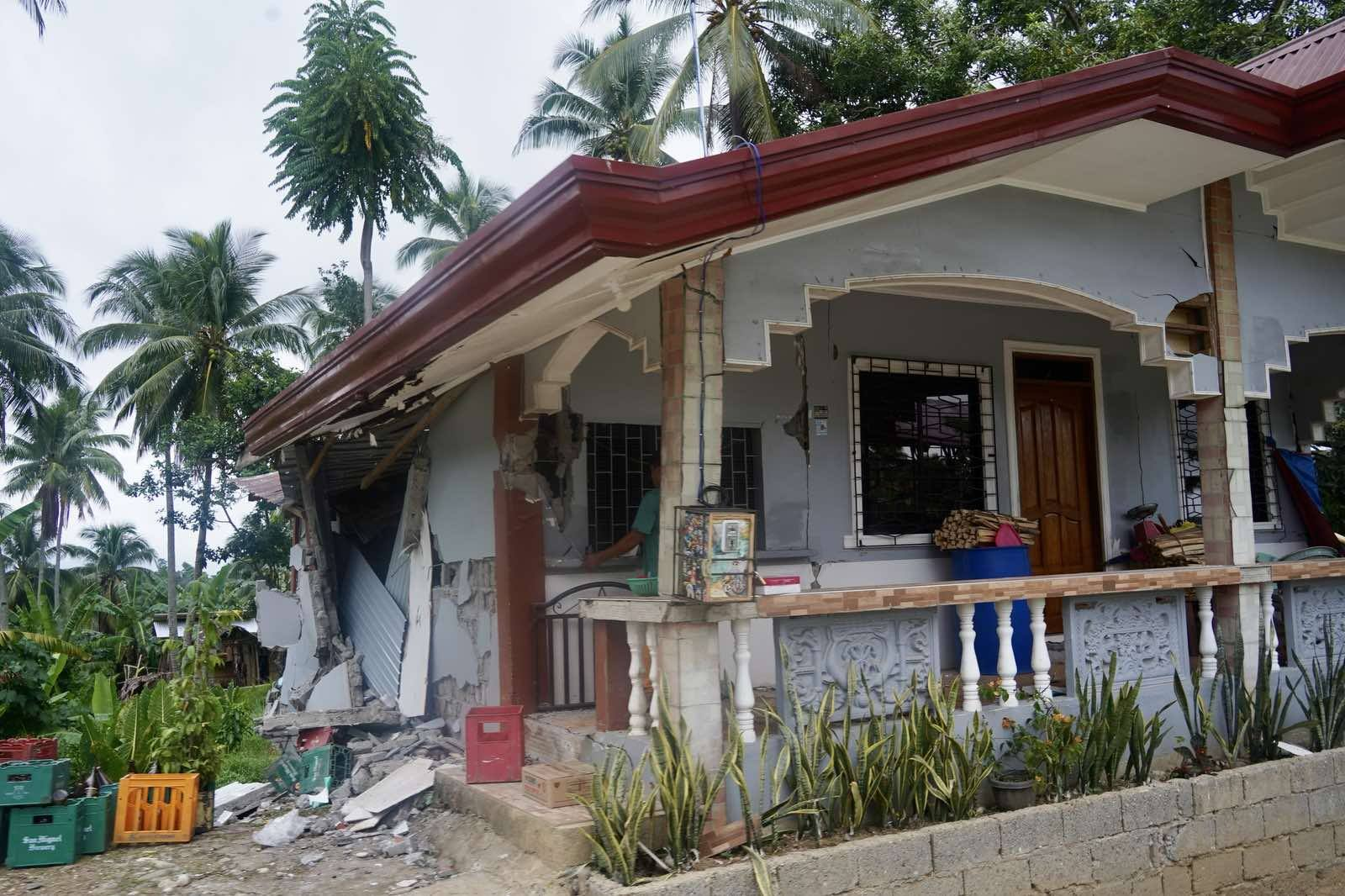
- A badly damaged house in Manay, Davao Oriental

- Location within Philippines
- UTC time: 2025-10-10 01:43:59; 2025-10-10 11:12:05
- ISC event: 644342317; 644342147
- USGS-ANSS: ComCat; ComCat
- Local date: October 10, 2025
- Local time: 09:43:59 PST (UTC+8); 19:12:05 PST (UTC+8)
- Duration: 30 seconds
- Magnitude: M_{w} 7.4; M_{w} 6.7–6.8
- Depth: 23 km (14 mi) (PHIVOLCS) 59.4 km (36.9 mi) (USGS); 37 km (23 mi) (PHIVOLCS) 47.0 km (29.2 mi) (USGS)
- Epicenter: 7.287°N 126.690°E
- Fault: Philippine Trench
- Areas affected: Davao Region, Soccsksargen and Caraga, Philippines
- Total damage: ₱350.03 million (US$7.11 million)
- Max. intensity: MMI VII (PEIS VI)
- Tsunami: 30 cm (12 in)
- Landslides: Yes
- Aftershocks: At least 1,629 recorded
- Casualties: 10 deaths, 176 injuries

On October 10, 2025, a doublet earthquake consisting of two events measuring M_{w} 7.4 and 6.7–6.8 struck eastern Mindanao in the Philippines. Both events raised tsunami warnings for seven provinces in the Philippines and parts of Indonesia, with minor tsunami waves observed. Thousands of aftershocks were recorded.

As of October 24, the Philippines' National Disaster Risk Reduction and Management Council (NDRRMC) reported 10 deaths, 176 injuries, and at least ₱350.03 million (US$7.11 million) in infrastructure damage. Nearly 25,600 homes were damaged, and numerous provinces and local government units suspended work and classes. Tremors were felt across Mindanao and beyond, including in Cebu and Antique in the Visayas, and as far as the Bicol Region in Luzon.

The earthquake struck only eleven days after the magnitude 6.9 earthquake in Cebu; however, it was determined that these events were not related.

== Tectonic setting ==
The Philippine Trench runs east of the Philippine archipelago and represents a major subduction zone where the Philippine Sea plate subducts westwards. At its southern portion, it runs north–south from the eastern coast of Mindanao to the northern part of Halmahera Island in Indonesia. The convergence rate along the trench varies from 3.2–5.4 cm (1.3–2.1 in) per year. Notable earthquakes along this zone occurred in 1992, 2012, 2021 and 2023.

== Earthquakes ==
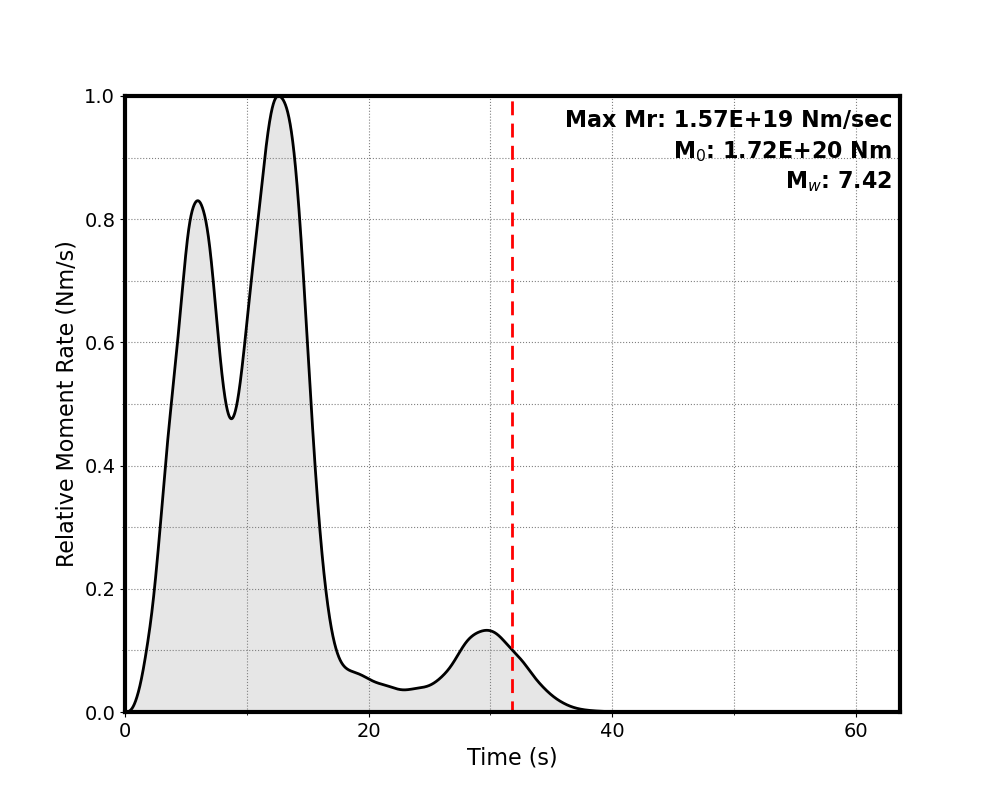
Graph of energy release for the first event

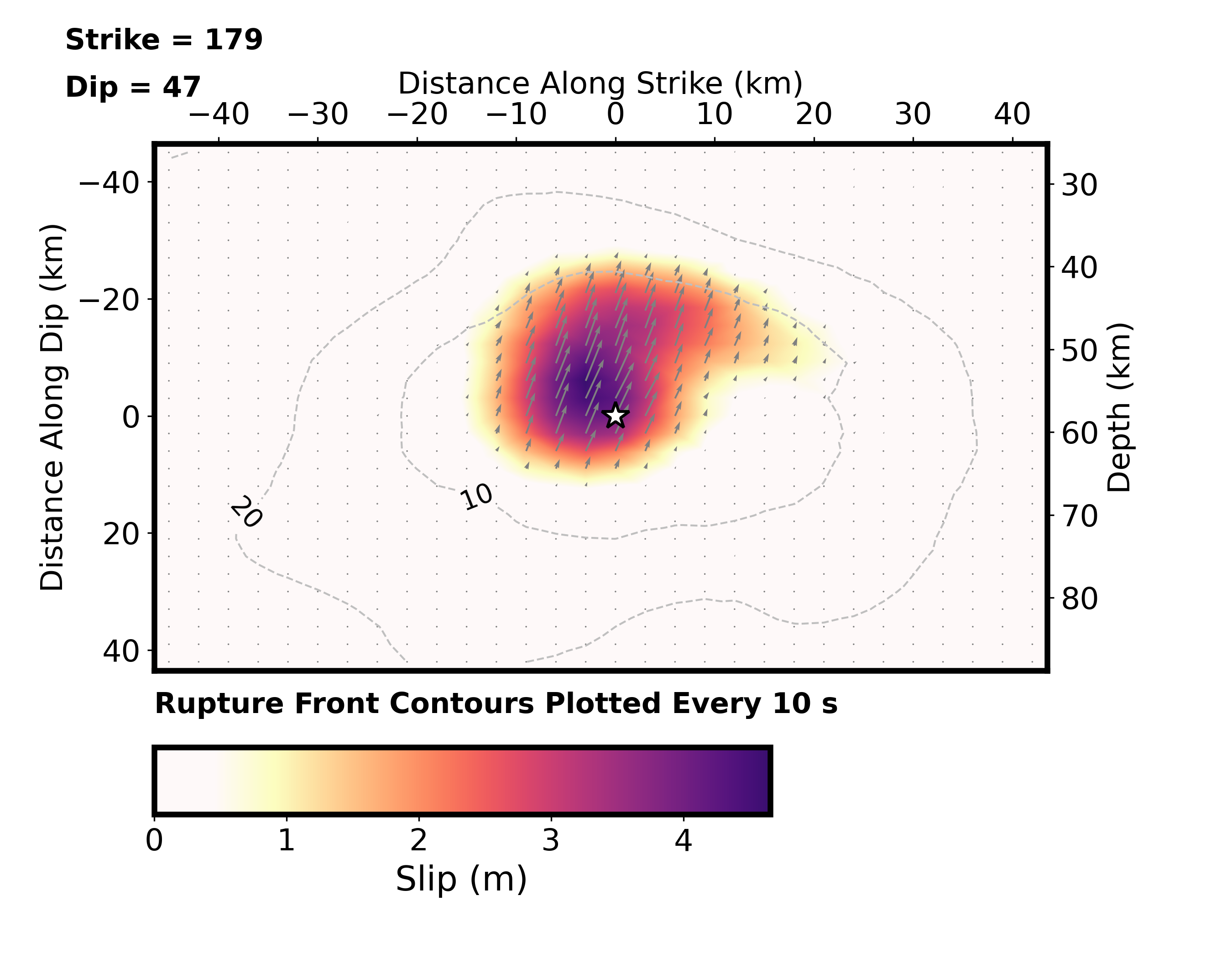
Slip distribution across the rupture for the first event

For the first event, PHIVOLCS initially recorded a moment magnitude (M_{w}) of 7.6 and a depth of 10 km (6 mi), while the United States Geological Survey (USGS) put the magnitude and depth at M_{ww}7.4 and 59.4 km (36.9 mi), respectively.

Shortly after, PHIVOLCS downgraded the magnitude to M_{w}7.4 with a depth of 23 km (14 mi). Intensity VI (Very strong) shaking was reported in Manay, with the intensity reaching V (Strong) in Davao City, and IV (Moderately strong) in Bislig, Cebu City, and Antique in the Visayas, and Sorsogon City in southern Luzon. In Indonesia, the earthquake was also felt with an intensity of IV (Light) in Tahuna and II (Weak) in Manado.

At 19:12 PHT (11:12 UTC) on October 10, a M_{ww} 6.7 or M_{w} 6.8 event struck the same region. Intensity VI (Very strong) shaking was reported in Manay, while tremors were felt as far as Zamboanga del Sur and Northern Samar. PHIVOLCS considered the earthquake a separate event and classified the sequence as a doublet earthquake. PHIVOLCS Director Teresito C. Bacolcol noted that the last large doublet earthquakes in the region were the 1992 Mindanao earthquakes, and the December 2023 Mindanao earthquake, adding that doublet earthquakes are “not unique” to the Philippine Trench region.

PHIVOLCS reported that both events were caused by a rupture on the Philippine Trench. The USGS reported that the first events occurred due to oblique reverse faulting. According to a finite fault model released by the USGS, the earthquake rupture extended about 90 km (56 mi) by 55 km (34 mi), with significant slip of up to 4.655 m (15.27 ft) estimated within a small radius of the hypocenter. The entire rupture process took just over 30 seconds with the greatest phase of seismic moment release occurring about 15 seconds after initiation.

=== Tsunami ===
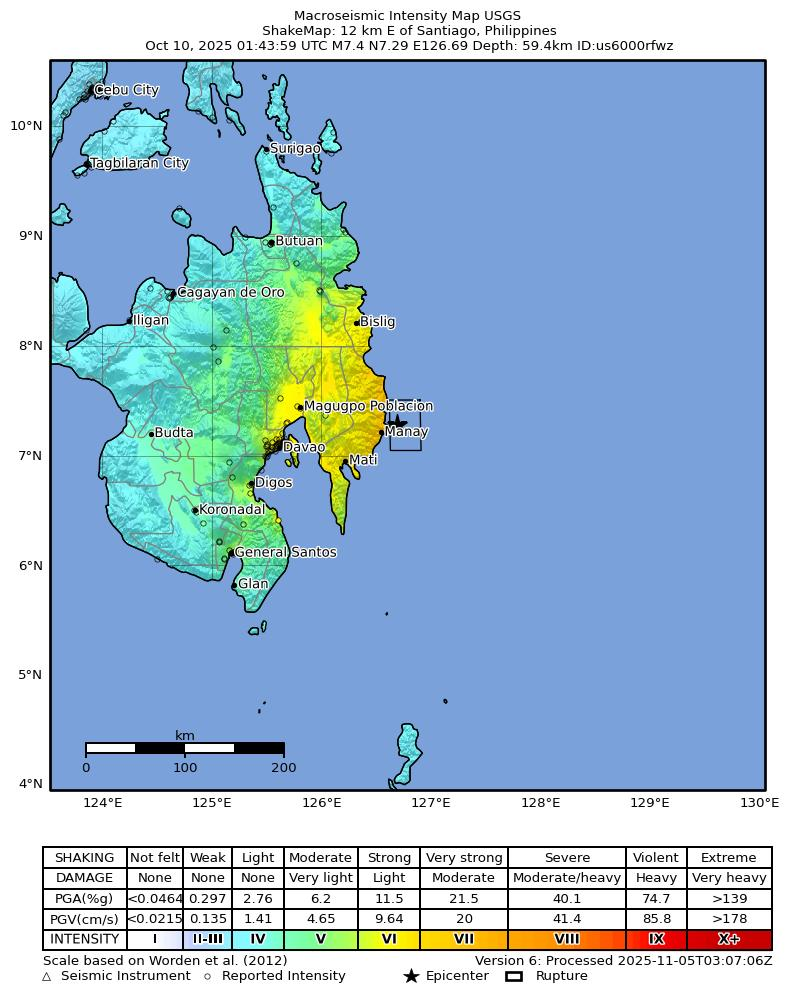
M_{w} 7.4 earthquake (first event)

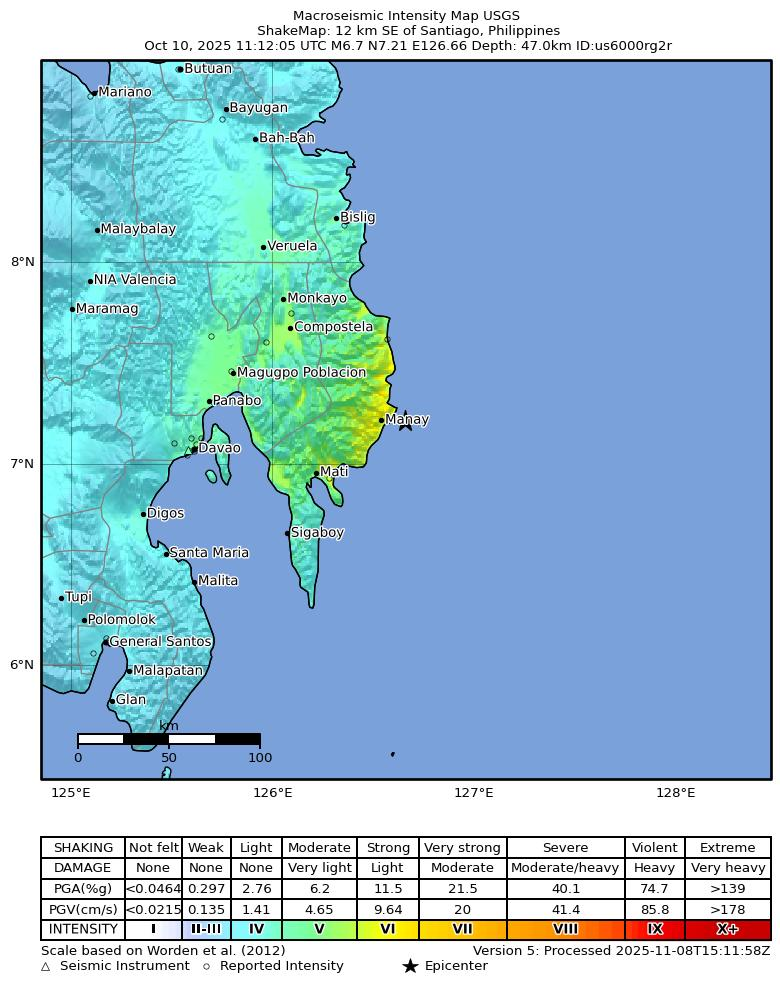
M_{w}6.7–6.8 earthquake (second event)

PHIVOLCS issued a tsunami warning, predicting that tsunami waves exceeding 1 m (3.3 ft) could strike Mindanao's eastern coast by 11:45 PST. The tsunami warning was issued for the provinces of Davao Oriental, Dinagat Islands, Surigao del Norte, Surigao del Sur, Eastern Samar, Southern Leyte, and Leyte. The Pacific Tsunami Warning Center warned of hazardous waves within 300 km (190 mi) of the epicenter which raised possibility for smaller waves as far away as Palau. Authorities in Indonesia issued a tsunami warning covering northern Sulawesi and Papua. Johnny Pimentel, the governor of Surigao del Sur, ordered the evacuation of coastal residents. Residents in Mati, Davao Oriental fled to higher ground, with seawater in Barangay Dahican observed to be receding. A 30 cm (12 in) wave struck Tandag. In Davao City, a 7 cm (2.8 in) high tsunami was observed. Tsunamis with heights of 19 cm (7.5 in) were observed in Beo, Talaud Islands Regency, 14 cm (5.5 in) was observed in Bere Bere, Morotai Island Regency, and 10 cm (3.9 in) in Talengen, Sangihe Islands Regency. PHIVOLCS canceled the tsunami warning at 13:43 PST (05:43 UTC).

Following the M_{w} 6.7–6.8 event, another tsunami warning was issued by PHIVOLCS at 19:12 PHT, covering the provinces of Surigao del Sur, Surigao del Norte, and Davao Oriental and affecting up to 1.8 million people, with waves forecast to reach 1 m (3 ft 3 in). This warning was cancelled at 23:12 PHT.

=== Aftershocks ===
As of October 24, 2025, at least 1,629 aftershocks, ranging in magnitude from 1.2 to 5.8, had been recorded following the doublet earthquakes, with at least 19 being felt.

== Impact ==
On October 24, the Philippines' National Disaster Risk Reduction and Management Council (NDRRMC) reported that a total of 362,644 families, or 1,511,900 people, were affected. Some 25,600 houses were damaged, of which 1,190 were destroyed. Damage to infrastructure was estimated at ₱350.03 million (US$7.11 million). The NDRRMC also reported 10 deaths and 176 injuries.

The Department of Education's Disaster Risk Reduction and Management Service (DRRMS) reported around 12,399 schools across Mindanao and parts of the Visayas were affected by the earthquake, with nearly 947 schools suspending classes, 89,691 learners and 4,188 teachers affected, including 137 injured learners and 49 teaching staff, and 1,419 damaged and 376 destroyed classrooms. The National Grid Corporation of the Philippines said four transmission lines and three power plants went down following the earthquake. At least 10 substations also tripped. Telecommunications company Globe Telecom stated that eight provinces had disrupted communications due to the tremors. The Philippine National Police said 18 police stations were damaged, while the municipal police station of Caraga, Davao Oriental was deemed uninhabitable due to structural damage. More than 1,000 workers in the tourism sector were affected in the Davao Region, according to the Department of Tourism.

=== Davao Region ===
Rockfall being cleared in Davao Oriental

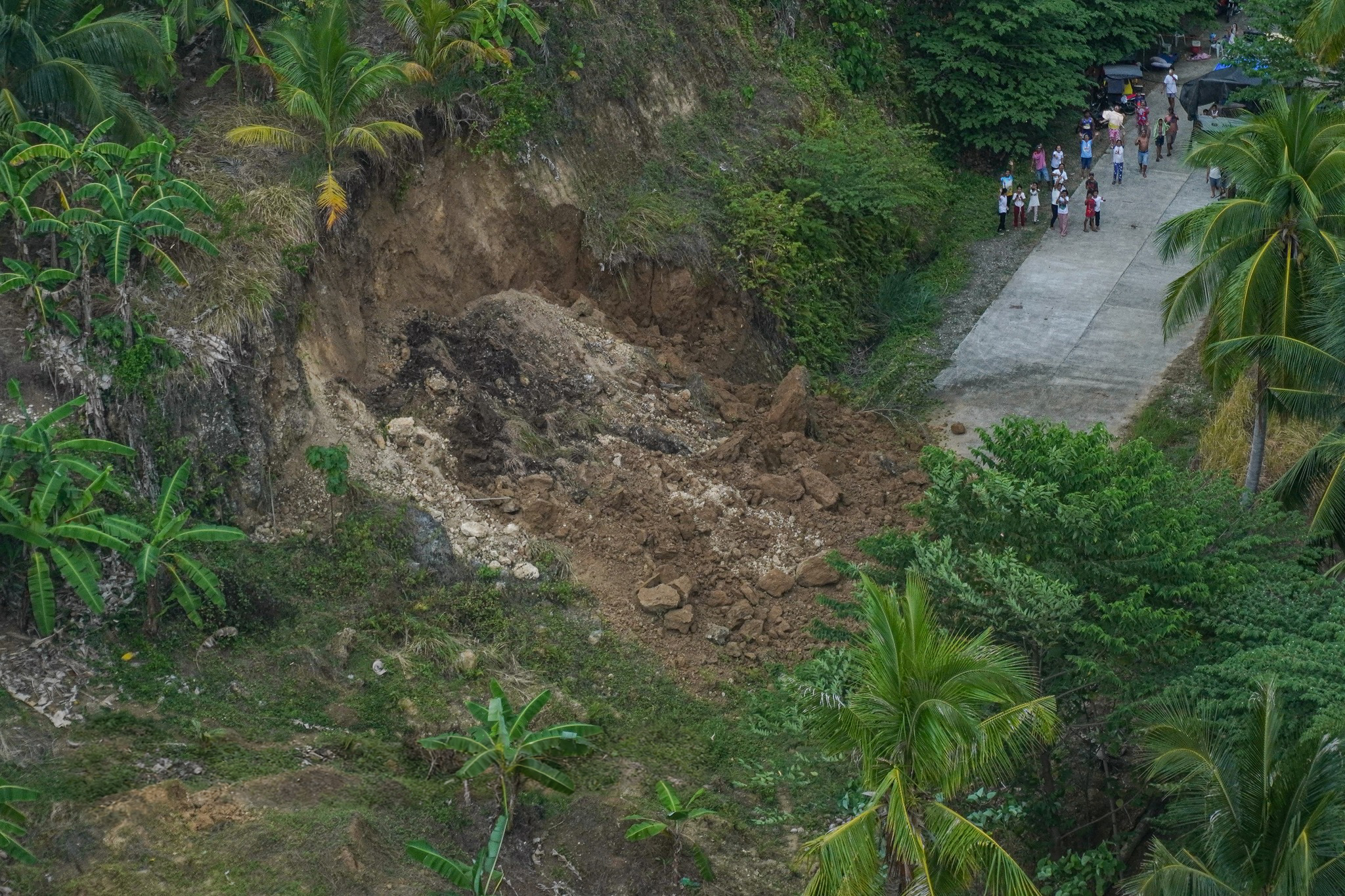
Landslides caused by the earthquake

The twin earthquakes affected 70,985 families across Davao Oriental, while 16,553 people were directly affected by tsunami warnings. In Baganga, 468 houses were destroyed, 6,761 more were damaged and 30 people were injured. In Lupon, six people were injured 37 buildings collapsed and 601 others were damaged. The Manay District Hospital sustained cracks in its foundations and its administration building sustained massive damage, forcing the evacuation of 200 patients and the conversion of a vacant lot into a ward. The town's St. Francis Xavier Parish church sustained a collapsed canopy and cracks in its ceiling, forcing the transfer of religious events to an activity center. The entirety of Davao Oriental suffered a blackout. A landslide occurred in Manay, where 38 schools were destroyed, 92 people were injured, 317 homes collapsed and 3,672 others were damaged. In Tarragona, 124 homes collapsed and 2,823 others were damaged, as well as a bridge. In Mati, 46 people were injured, 25 homes collapsed and 1,013 others and seven schools were damaged. Roads from Caraga town to Mati were blocked by debris and fallen electric poles. In Caraga, 55 people were injured, 237 homes were destroyed and 2,809 others were damaged, while in Cateel, 21 people were injured, 29 homes were destroyed and 2,225 others were damaged. Nine people were injured, five homes collapsed and 27 others were damaged in Banaybanay, and minor damage to schools occurred in Boston. Two roads in Lupon were deemed impassable. At least 315 homes and all public schools were damaged and 50 people were injured in Governor Generoso.

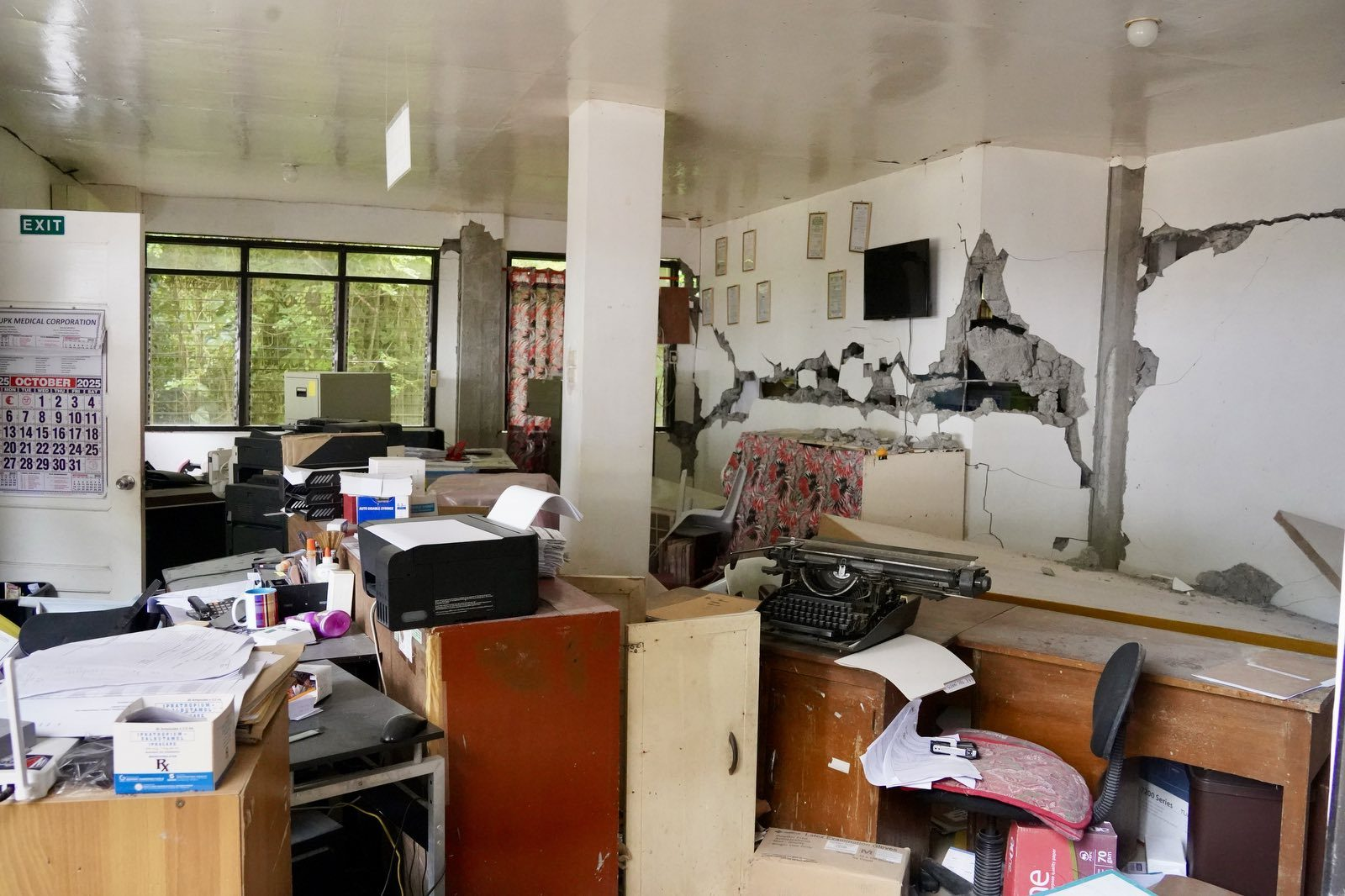
The Provincial Hospital in Manay, Davao Oriental suffered severe damage

Across Davao del Norte, 72 homes collapsed and 1,029 others were damaged. In Tagum, a building of Tagum Doctors College and the Tagum City Flyover shook heavily during the earthquake. Tagum Doctors Hospital experienced major wall cracks and Tagum Doctors College was sealed off due to major structural damage. The city recorded 496 damaged homes, of which 22 had collapsed. Meanwhile, Tagum City Hall suffered partial damage due to broken glass panels, falling debris, and hairline cracks. A government official in Tagum said mass panic broke out at a government event when the earthquake struck. Students at Davao de Oro State College gathered outside school buildings following the earthquake. The Ateneo de Davao University and Mapúa Malayan Colleges Mindanao sustained damages, while the University of the Philippines Mindanao shifted classes to asynchronous mode and work-from-home basis until October 13, 2025. Passengers and employees of the Francisco Bangoy International Airport immediately rushed out, while the airport itself sustained minor damage. Passengers in a plane which just landed at the airport were stranded. Minor damage occurred to the logistics building in Dipolog Airport. Two passenger aircraft travelling from Manila to Davao were diverted to Cebu and General Santos respectively. Patients were evacuated from the Southern Philippines Medical Center and the Davao Oriental Provincial Medical Center. Business process outsourcing employees evacuated to a boulevard in Davao City. In Davao City, 347 people either fainted or were injured.

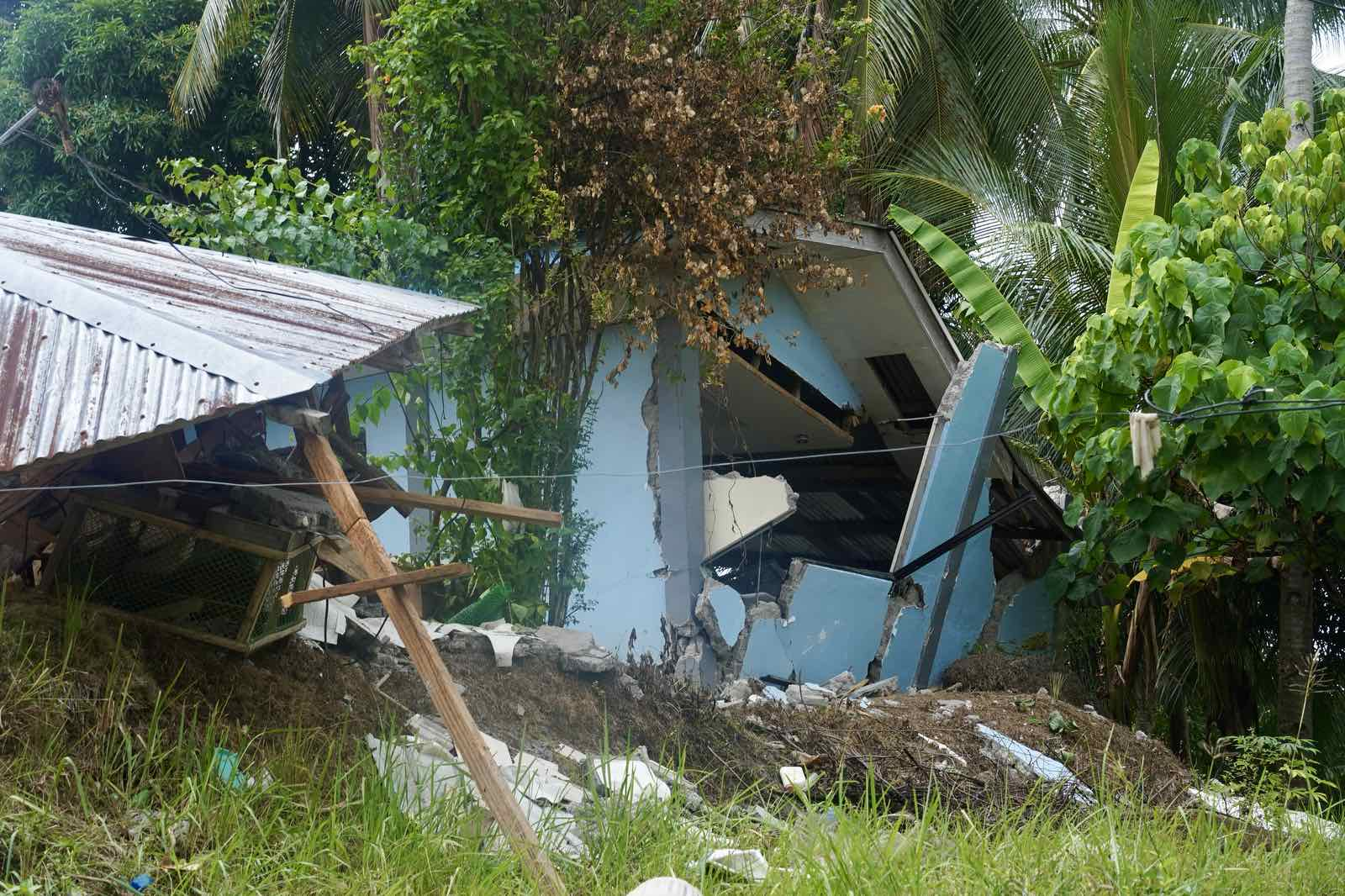
A collapsed house in Manay

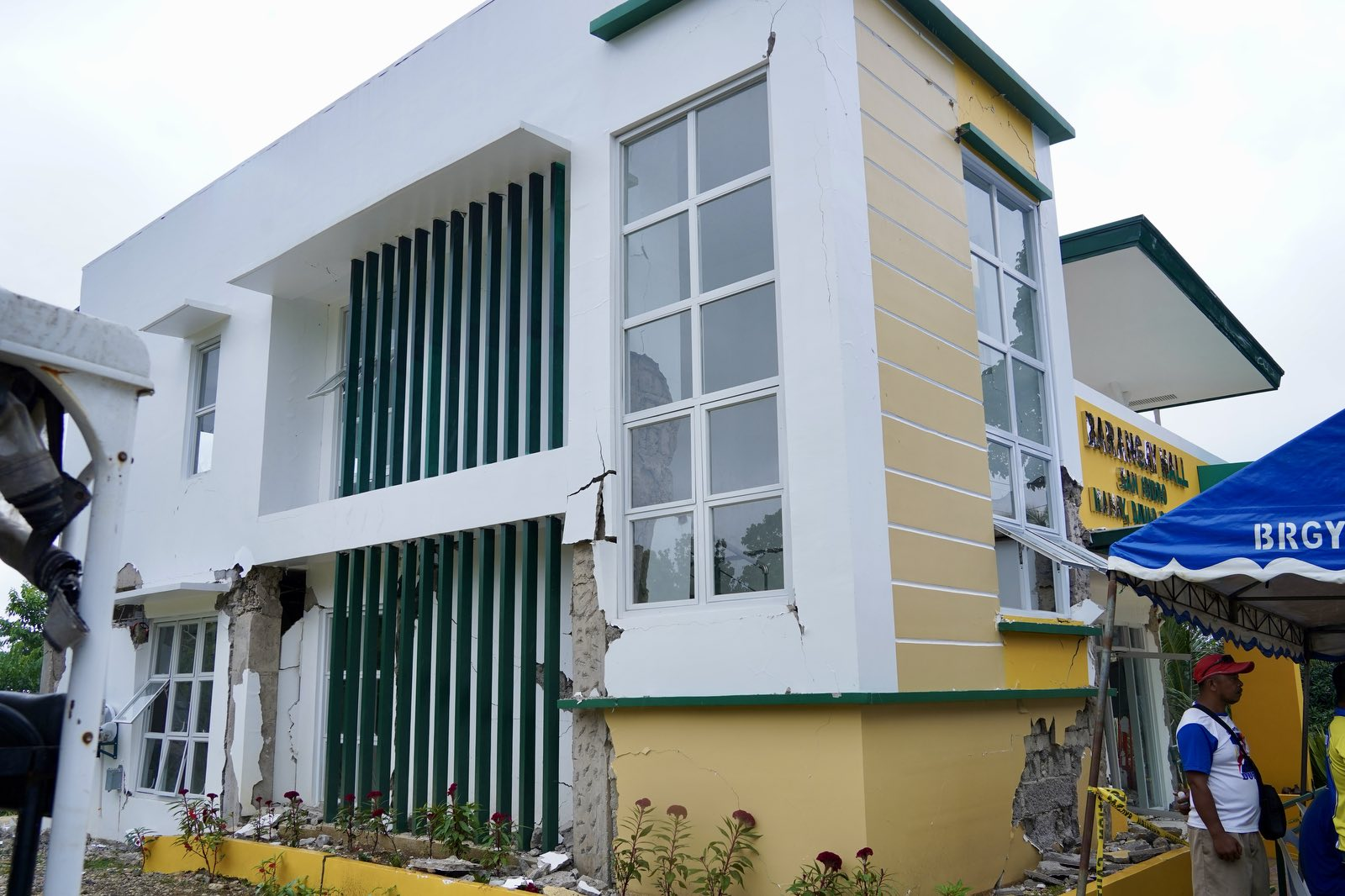
Damage to the Barangay Hall in San Isidro, Manay

Police stations in Panabo and Talaingod sustained damage. Chemical spills occurred in San Pedro College and Mapúa Malayan Colleges Mindanao. In Digos, 12 students were hospitalized due to panic attacks. A classroom in Montevista collapsed and a landslide occurred beside the road linking Barangays Camantangan and Canidkid of the same municipality. The Supreme Court of the Philippines said 36 courts in the Davao Region were damaged. In Davao de Oro, 15,421 homes were damaged or destroyed, of which 306 collapsed. Three roads were damaged in Monkayo: two of them were deemed impassable while one was deemed passable for light vehicles. A bridge in a national road in Davao City was only passable in one lane. Power outages were experienced in Mawab, Monkayo, and Mabini in the province of Davao de Oro. In Monkayo, 1,314 homes were damaged and 22 others collapsed, while 5,104 homes were damaged or destroyed in Maragusan, 3,937 homes were damaged in Mawab and 103 buildings collapsed in Pantukan.

=== Elsewhere ===
Across Caraga Region, 1,751 houses were damaged, 15 of them severely. In Agusan del Sur, 11 homes collapsed and 814 others were damaged, along with a bridge in Talacogon and a building of the Philippine Normal University campus in Prosperidad. During evacuation, students at the Agusan del Sur National High School fainted. In Surigao del Sur, four homes collapsed while 922 others were damaged, including 495 in San Agustin, 166 in Bislig and 146 in Lingig. A bridge in Butuan was temporarily closed following reports of a crack and was inspected by the city mayor, Lawrence Fortun. Some structures were damaged in Iligan and Cagayan de Oro, while a landslide occurred in Camiguin. Power outages occurred in Misamis Oriental and Davao City. Workers from the Misamis Oriental capitol building in Cagayan de Oro rushed outdoors. Parts of Robinsons Butuan collapsed due to the detachment of a section of the mall's exterior cladding. About 80 people in South Cotabato were hospitalized due to quake-induced hyperventilation. The Makilala–Allah Valley Road in Tulunan was slightly damaged but was deemed passable. A road and a bridge in Talacogon were deemed impassable to all vehicles. Power outages were caused in six barangays in Butuan. In the Dinagat Islands, seven seaports were deemed non-operational. In Surigao City, 47 passengers were stranded in the local port. Six houses were damaged in Santa Josefa. In Valencia, Bukidnon, 26 government and private school buildings, alongside offices, stages, and barangay halls, sustained cracks or partial structural damage; the most affected areas were in Mount Nebo, Bagontaas and Kahaponan, which each reported multiple classrooms with visible cracks. In Lutayan, Sultan Kudarat, celebrations for the town's Kanduli Festival were disrupted by the earthquake, resulting in mass panic and two teachers fainting.

Patients in hospitals across Tacloban and employees from Tacloban City Hall were evacuated. A major shopping mall in the city was temporarily closed for inspection. The University of the Philippines Tacloban suspended classes and office work. The opening ceremony of a school sports competition in Leyte, Leyte was disrupted along with a distribution of cash for victims of Typhoon Bualoi (Opong) in Catbalogan. In Maydolong, officials warned fishermen not to venture out in sea. Residents were ordered to evacuate in Dulag, Leyte while the governor of Southern Leyte, Damian Mercado ordered residents to go inland. The State of the Province Address led by the Governor of Bohol, Aris Aumentado was disrupted when attendees were ordered to evacuate but were eventually let back inside. Work was also suspended in Cebu City Hall. In Mandaue, 74 students received medical assistance for earthquake-induced psychological episodes in five schools, prompting the mayor to suspend all face-to-face classes in the city for a week beginning on October 13.

== Response ==
=== Local ===
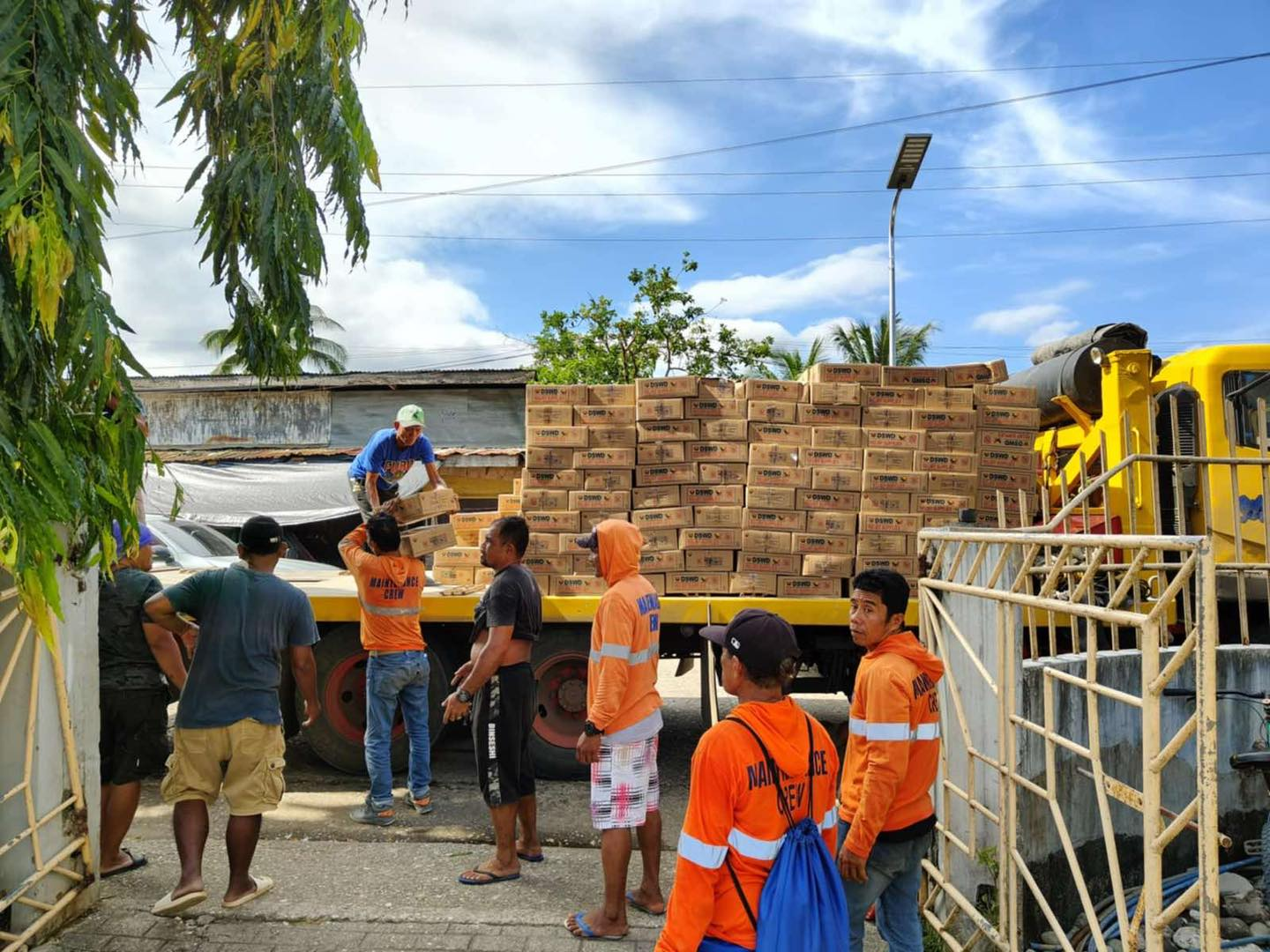
The Department of Social Welfare and Development delivered food packs to people affected in Manay, Davao Oriental

Classes and work were suspended in all levels and offices throughout the Davao Region (except for Davao del Sur which only suspended work in all Provincial Government offices) as well as in the provinces of Maguindanao del Sur, Agusan del Sur, Sultan Kudarat, South Cotabato, and in parts of Bukidnon, Bohol, Iloilo, Negros Occidental, Cotabato, Sarangani, Leyte and Cebu. The city government of General Santos suspended face-to-face classes in all levels on October 13 and 14. All local disaster risk reduction management offices (LDRRMOs) of the affected provinces, cities, and municipalities were placed on “red alert” status, and coastal barangays activated evacuation protocols, cleared fishing zones and beachfront areas, and monitored sea levels. Bishop Abel Apigo of the Diocese of Mati directed parishes and Catholic schools in Davao Oriental to temporarily suspend the use of their churches and buildings pending the results of safety inspections.

Manay, being the most affected town by the two earthquakes, was placed under a state of calamity by Mayor Jon Marco Dayanghirang on October 11, 2025, as all 17 of its barangays have been affected and electricity had not been restored as of the evening of October 10. The Provincial Government of Davao Oriental subsequently placed the entire province under a state of calamity, suspended all operations of coastal tourism and prepared aid for affected families particularly in the municipalities of Tarragona and Manay which included 1,000 food packs, 240 jerry cans, 125 modular tents, kitchen kits, sleeping kits, family tents, and hygiene kits. Meanwhile, in Mati, a total of 1,938 individuals has been evacuated to temporary shelters. The Provincial Government also established a Provincial Donation Management Committee and crafted guidelines on accepting, managing, and disbursing donations for earthquake victims. The Provincial Government of Davao de Oro suspended all mining operations and temporarily closed mining sites for safety reasons. The Davao City Government prepared 100,000 food packs for distribution, with an additional 5,000 ready-to-eat food boxes readied. Engineers from the City Engineer’s Office and Department of Public Works and Highways inspected all major bridges in the city and found no major structural damage. A 60-day price freeze on basic goods and a 15-day price freeze on certain fuels was declared in Davao Oriental.

Robinsons Malls assessed the safety of its branches in the Davao Region and reported that damage to Robinsons Butuan did not affect the building’s structural foundations.

=== Government ===
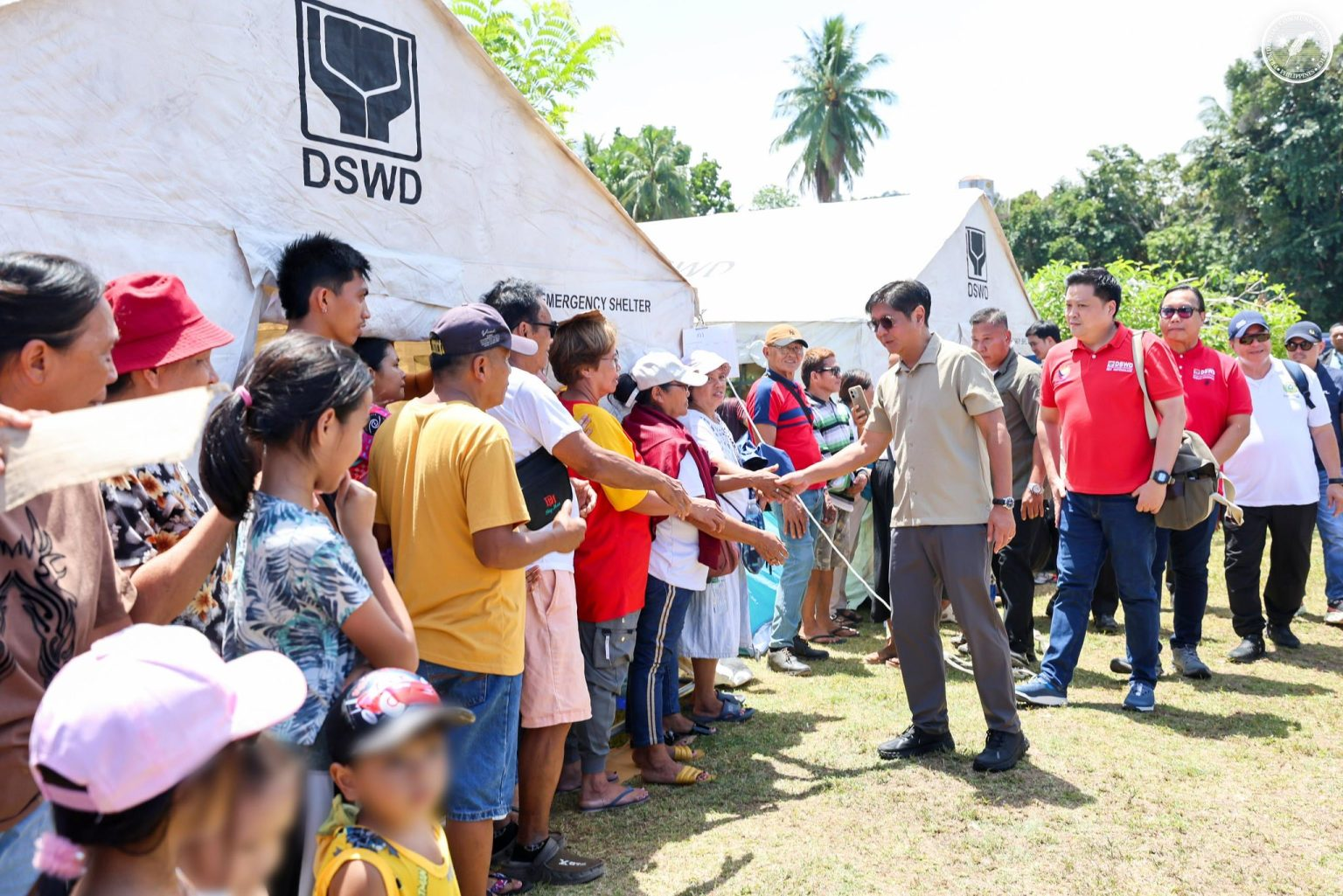
President Bongbong Marcos visited the earthquake-affected areas in Davao Oriental

The Office of Civil Defense (OCD) held a briefing regarding the earthquake, with President Bongbong Marcos directed numerous agencies to assess the situation in Davao and told Filipinos to "stay calm" and told the frontline agencies the next day to work "round-the-clock". The Philippine Coast Guard temporarily suspended sea travels in Eastern Visayas and Southeastern Mindanao; the suspensions were eventually lifted that same day upon expiration of the tsunami advisory. The Bureau of Fire Protection (BFP) and the Armed Forces of the Philippines were deployed to help assist with relief efforts while the Davao and Caraga regional headquarters of the Philippine National Police were placed on "full alert". The BFP started inspecting structures in Butuan. The Department of Public Works and Highways started clearing operations in Davao Oriental. The Civil Aeronautics Board of the Philippines urged airlines to provide flexible arrangements to passengers affected and also asked them to assist relief efforts.

The OCD Region XI conducted an aerial assessment of the damage caused by the earthquake. The DSWD in Tarragona, Davao Oriental held child-friendly activities to assist children affected by the earthquake. The National Disaster Risk Reduction and Management Council (NDRRMC) placed its operations on red alert. On October 24, the NDRRMC reported that a total of ₱86.19 billion (US$1.75 billion) worth of assistance had been provided to the Davao and Caraga regions. The Philippine Army deployed soldiers to Davao Oriental, Davao de Oro, Davao del Norte, and Agusan del Sur to assist in emergency and relief operations.

Vice President Sara Duterte visited Davao Oriental to express sympathy and assured support through the Office of the Vice President’s Davao Satellite Office. President Marcos also visited Davao Oriental and pledged assistance. Marcos ordered the release of ₱298 million (US$6.05 million) in aid to local government units in the Davao and Caraga Region hit by the twin earthquakes. His office provided ₱50 million (US$1.02 million) to Davao Oriental and varying amounts to other affected areas.

=== International ===
The U.S. government prepositioned 137,000 food packs and shelter kits, while the Japanese government, through the Japan International Cooperation Agency, provided emergency relief goods to the Philippines after the doublet earthquake. The United Nations stated that it was prepared to send aid to Davao Oriental.

== See also ==
- December 2023 Mindanao earthquake – a major earthquake that struck the same region
- 1992 Mindanao earthquakes – historical doublet earthquake that struck the same region
- List of earthquakes in 2025
- List of earthquakes in the Philippines
- 2026 Mindanao earthquake
