= Michael Thungari =

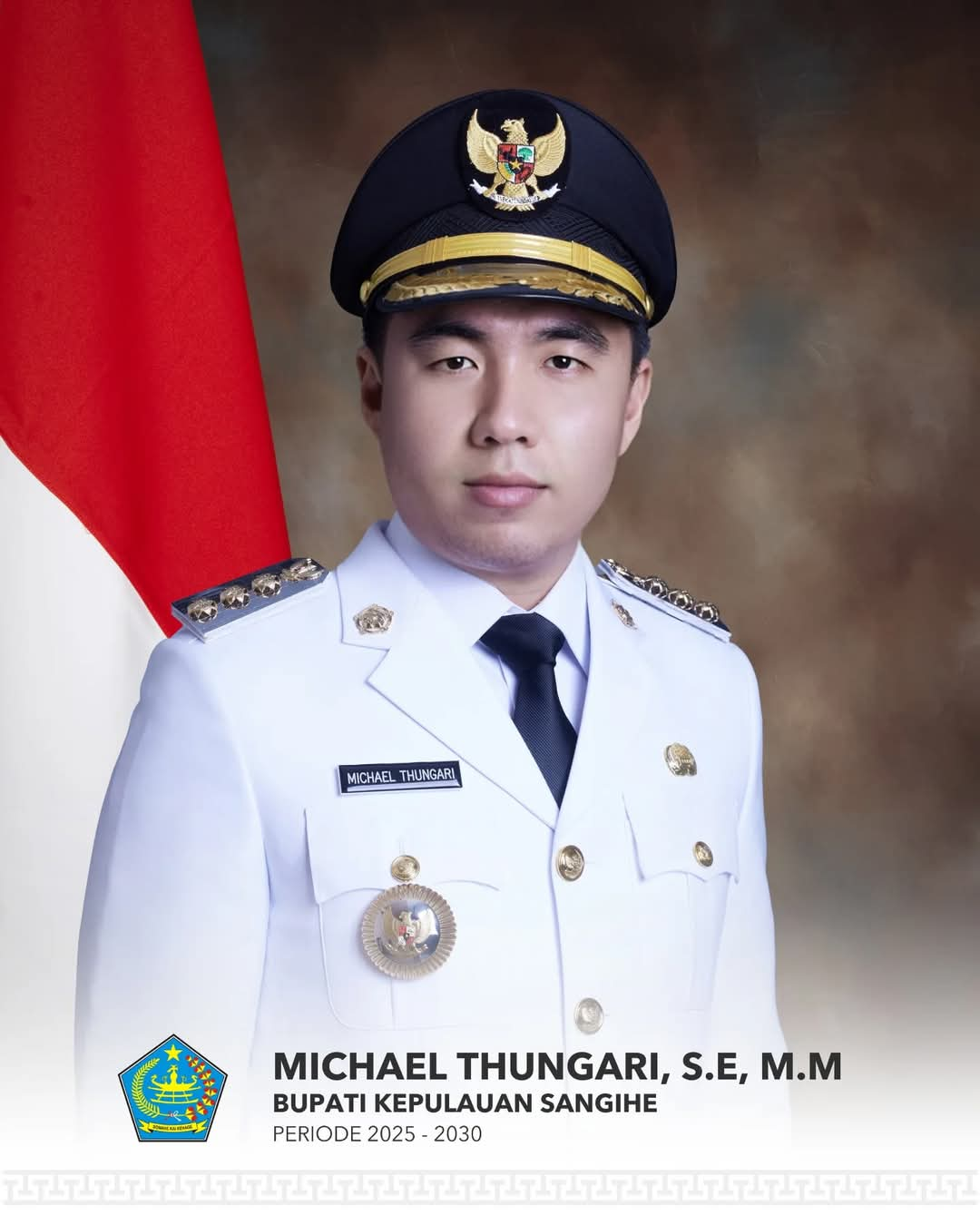

Regent of Sangihe Islands
- Incumbent
- Assumed office 20 February 2025
- Preceded by: Jabes Ezar Gaghana; Albert H. Wounde (act.)

Personal details
- Born: 15 February 1989 (age 37) Manado, North Sulawesi, Indonesia
- Party: NasDem Party

Michael Thungari (born 15 February 1989) is an Indonesian politician of the NasDem Party and businessman who is the regent of Sangihe Islands Regency, North Sulawesi, since February 2025. He was previously a member of the regency's local legislature, and was engaged in logistics business related to Sangihe.

== Early life ==
Michael Thungari was born on 16 February 1989 in Manado. His father is Seunal Thungari. After completing high school in Manado, Thungari moved to Surabaya for further studies, obtaining his bachelor's degree from the Petra Christian University in 2010 and later a master's in management from Airlangga University in 2012.

== Career ==
After graduating from Airlangga, Thungari began to run PT Pancaran Berkat Mulia, a logistics and construction company which operates cargo ships between Makassar and Tahuna, capital of the Sangihe Islands Regency. The company heavily utilized the Sea Toll Program, which according to Thungari subsidized around half of the shipping cost to Tahuna.

In 2019, Thungari ran for a seat in Sangihe Islands' Regional House of Representatives (DPRD Sangihe) as a NasDem Party member, securing a seat after winning 2,985 votes, the most of the 25 elected members. He became the deputy speaker in the DPRD. He was reelected in 2024, again winning the most votes (3,012).

Thungari ran for regent of Sangihe Islands in its 2024 regency election, with Golkar DPRD member Tendris Bulahari as running mate. They were backed by Nasdem, PKB, and Hanura. The pair secured 38,385 votes (46.6%) in the four-way race and won the election. Thungari and Bulahari were sworn in on 20 February 2025.

As regent, Thungari initiated a car free day program at Tahuna's town center, accompanied by public sports events and free medical checkups on weekends.

== Personal life ==
Thungari is married to Cherry Shandyca Soeyoenus. He also chaired the Football Association of Indonesia's Sangihe Islands branch.
