= 2025 Philippine earthquakes =

2025 Philippine earthquakes may refer to any of the following earthquakes:

- September 30: Cebu earthquake
- October 10: Davao Oriental earthquakes

== See also ==
- List of earthquakes in 2025
- List of earthquakes in the Philippines
