= 2024 Sangihe Islands regency election =

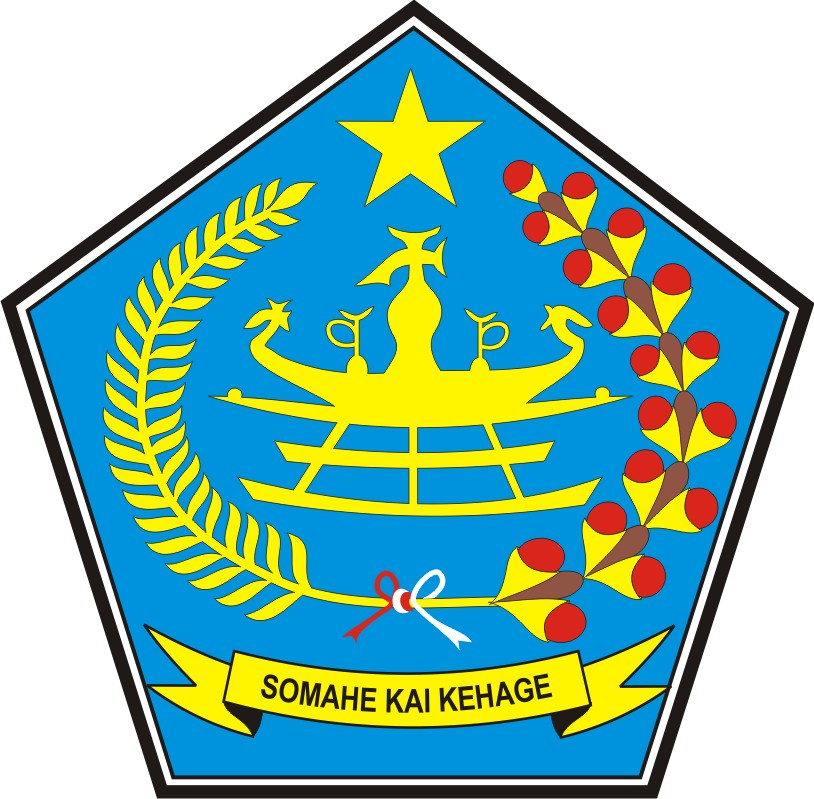
- 27 November 2024
- Turnout: 78.8%
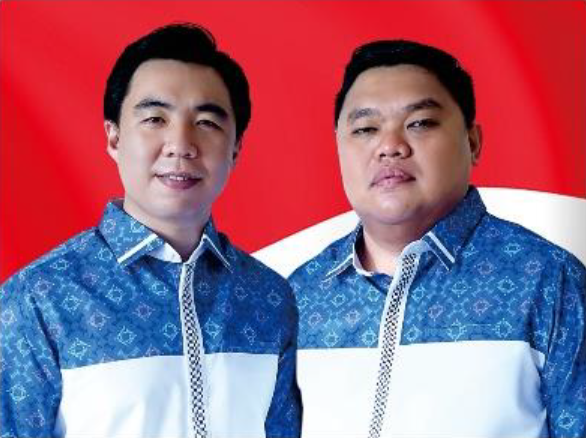

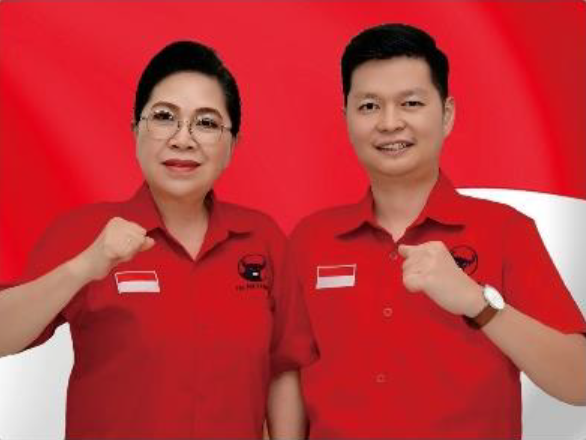
Candidate	Michael Thungari	Rinny Tamuntuan
Party	NasDem	PDI-P
Running mate	Tendris Bulahari	Mario Seliang
Popular vote	38,385	29,390
Percentage	46.57%	35.66%
Regent before election
Albert H. Wounde (act.)
Elected Regent
Michael Thungari
NasDem

The 2024 Sangihe Islands regency election was held on 27 November 2024 as part of nationwide local elections to elect the mayor and vice mayor of the Sangihe Islands Regency, North Sulawesi for a five-year term. The previous election was held in 2017. NasDem Party candidate Michael Thungari managed to defeat three other candidates to win the election, including previous regent Jabes Ezer Gaghana and previous acting regent Rinny Tamuntuan.

== Electoral system ==
The election, like other local elections in 2024, follow the first-past-the-post system where the candidate with the most votes wins the election, even if they do not win a majority. It is possible for a candidate to run uncontested, in which case the candidate is still required to win a majority of votes "against" an "empty box" option. Should the candidate fail to do so, the election will be repeated on a later date.

The number of eligible voters in the regency was announced to be 106,108 in September 2024 by Sangihe Islands' General Elections Commission (KPU). KPU initially received Rp 31.5 billion (~USD 2 million) in funds to run the election, and later requested more funding from the municipal government. The request was rejected.

== Candidates ==
The previous regent, Jabes Ezar Gaghana, opted to run for a second term after the end of his 2017–2022 term. As running mate, he selected Patras Madonsa, former head of Sangihe–Talaud's Christian Evangelical Church, who was also chairman of Sangihe's cultural agency. Adopting the name "Menggana" for the campaign, the pair was supported by Golkar and Demokrat.

Michael Thungari, a NasDem Party deputy speaker of Sangihe's Regional House of Representatives (DPRD) in 2019–2024, was nominated by his party to run in the election. As his running mate was Tendris Bulahari, a Golkar member of Sangihe DPRD, who ran without Golkar's approval. Campaigning as "Tuari", ticket received additional endorsements from PKB and Hanura.

After the end of Gaghana's term in 2022, an acting regent was appointed for Sangihe, civil servant Rinny Tamuntuan. In 2024, Tamuntuan resigned from this post to run in the regency election. Tamuntuan selected Mario Seliang, a local businessman, as her running mate. The ticket received the endorsement of the Indonesian Democratic Party of Struggle.

Another candidate was Hendrik Manossoh, an academic at the Sam Ratulangi University in Manado. Manossoh ran with Remran Sinadia, a Gerindra party legislator who was a regency DPRD member of Teluk Wondama Regency in West Papua between 2014 and 2024. The pair was endorsed by Gerindra and Perindo.

== Campaign ==
Two rounds of public debates between the candidates were held, on 19 October and 17 November 2024. Prior to the debates, there were concerns that a budget shortage would result in just a single debate (in the previous election, three debates had been held).

== Results ==
Candidate	Running mate	Candidate party	Votes	%
Michael Thungari	Tendris Bulahari	Nasdem	38,385	46.57
Rinny Tamuntuan	Mario Seliang	PDI-P	29,390	35.66
Hendrik Manossoh	Remran Sinadia	Gerindra	7,685	9.32
Jabes Ezar Gaghana	Patras Madonsa	Golkar	6,963	8.45
Total			82,423	100.00
Valid votes			82,423	98.59
Invalid/blank votes			1,182	1.41
Total votes			83,605	100.00
Registered voters/turnout			106,108	78.79
Source: Sangihe Islands KPU
