= Hinatuan =

Municipality in Surigao del Sur, Philippines

- Municipality
- Municipality of Hinatuan
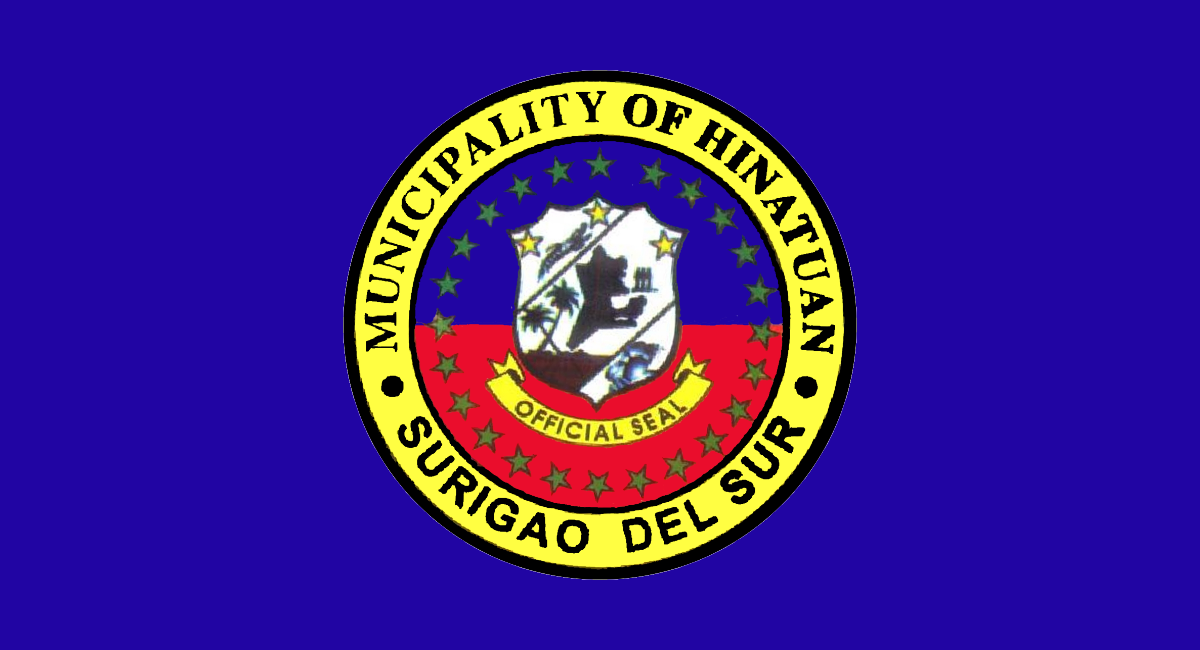
- Flag Seal

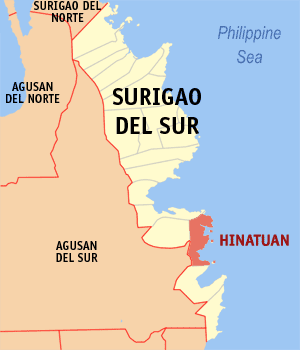
- Map of Surigao del Sur with Hinatuan highlighted
- Interactive map of Hinatuan
- Location within the Philippines
- Coordinates: 8°21′58″N 126°20′10″E
- Country: Philippines
- Region: Caraga
- Province: Surigao del Sur
- District: 2nd district
- Barangays: 24 (see Barangays)

Government
  - Type: Sangguniang Bayan
  - Mayor: Tito A. Cañedo III
  - Vice Mayor: Joan M. Garay
  - Representative: Alexander T. Pimentel
  - Electorate: 33,553 voters (2025)

Area
  - Total: 299.10 km^{2} (115.48 sq mi)
- Elevation: 51 m (167 ft)

Population (2024 census)
  - Total: 44,475
  - Density: 148.70/km^{2} (385.12/sq mi)
  - Households: 10,486

Economy
  - Income class: 1st municipal income class
  - Poverty incidence: 19.75% (2023)
  - Revenue: ₱ 281.9 million (2024)
  - Assets: ₱ 695.4 million (2024)
  - Expenditure: ₱ 247.4 million (2024)
  - Liabilities: ₱ 178.9 million (2024)

Service provider
  - Electricity: Surigao del Sur 1 Electric Cooperative (SURSECO 1)
- Time zone: UTC+8 (PST)
- ZIP code: 8310
- PSGC: 1606809000
- IDD : area code: +63 (0)86
- Native languages: Surigaonon; Agusan; Cebuano; Tagalog; Kamayo
- Website: hinatuan.gov.ph

Hinatuan is a municipality in the province of Surigao del Sur, Philippines. According to the 2024 census, it has a population of 44,475 people.

Hinatuan is approximately 44 kilometers (27 miles) north of Bislig, a city in the same province and 132.7 km (approximately 82.5 miles) south of Tandag, the provincial capital.

== History ==
=== Pre-Spanish Era ===
The history of Hinatuan in the annals of historical heritage can be traced back from the time of the Spaniards in this part of Mindanao. The intermingling of tribes such as the Manobos, the Mansakas, Subanons and the Mandayas through assimilation and amalgamation leads to the final unification of a group of people who settled in the old town site known as Da-an Lungsod. Being the first and the earliest settlement, it was later identified as part of the province of Caraga under the administration of the politico - militar of Encomienda Bislig.

The name Hinatuan, originally derived from the word "Hatud" and later called "Hatudan" which was handed down from generation to generation through the oral version. These words have two versions - "Hatud" in the native language is simply known in English as "bring." In fact, fishing is the major occupation of the inhabitants. To denote a place, a suffix "-an" was added to "Hatud" to become "Hatudan".

=== Spanish Era ===
The place used to be a pathway where dead bodies of people being transferred to another place and that's why it called "hinatudan" which translates to "a place where (something) is brought". Right until in 1856, the town was transferred to its present site, formerly known as "Hinatudan" now known as Hinatuan as ordered by the higher Spanish authorities. A political government was set up with Raymundo Bandola, the first captain known as defender of the town against the Moro piracy. He was followed by Capitanes Edobigito Lindo, Atanacio de Castro, Tomas Luna, Fernando Nazareno and Teodoro Villaluz. Eugenio Villaluz was accredited the last capitan under the Spanish regime, the first and last captain under the First Philippine Republic, and the first presidential appointee under the American regime. These mentioned capitanes contributed much to the building of the physical set up of the town.

The appointed presidents following Eugenio Villaluz were : Mariano Verano, Pablo Evangelio, Nicomedes Villaluz and Ex-Captain Fernando Nazareno. Domingo Balbuena was the first president - elect and followed by Florencio Villaluz, Antonio Picazales, Victoriano Evangelio, Modesto Raura and Damian Siano. Again, these town executives were responsible for the expansion of the town to a larger area.

=== Japanese Era ===
World War II broke out. A few months later, a strong typhoon hit Hinatuan. Heavy damages inflected to both private and public properties especially to buildings, coconut plantations and other potential crops, forest reserves, and machineries and equipment of the Portlamon Lumber Company. Guerrilla activities then sprung up to lessen the influence and strength of the Armed Forces of the Empire of Japan and to prepare the people for liberation of the country by the allied forces.

=== Modern day ===
After the war, Elpedio Chavez was appointed mayor of the town. He was later followed by the first-elect, Mayor Tito Cañedo, Sr., under the Republic of the Philippines. He helped much in the rehabilitation and reconstruction of the town. He was followed by Mayor Joaquin Villaluz, Segundo Cuyno, Sr., Candelario Viola, Sr., Jose Pepino, Sr., the mayor under the Martial Law period, LADP scholar Atty. Candelario J. Viola, Jr., Cristina M. Camba, Dr. Alicia V. Momongan, Shem G. Garay and the incumbent Mayor Atty. Tito A. Cañedo III.

Hinatuan was the epicenter of a magnitude 7.6 earthquake on 2 December 2023. It damaged or destroyed nearly 10% of the town's houses. The town's mayor reported that about 41,000 of the town's 43,000 residents were affected.

== Geography ==
=== Barangays ===
Hinatuan is politically subdivided into 24 barangays. Each barangay consists of puroks, while some have sitios.

- Baculin
- Bigaan
- Cambatong
- Campa
- Dugmanon
- Harip
- La Casa (Poblacion)
- Loyola
- Maligaya
- Bitoon (formerly pagtigi-an)
- Pocto
- Port Lamon
- Roxas
- San Juan
- Sasa
- Tagasaka
- Tagbobonga
- Talisay
- Tarusan
- Tidman
- Tiwi
- Zone I Benigno Aquino (Poblacion)
- Zone II Santo Niño (Poblacion)
- Zone III Maharlika (Poblacion)

=== Climate ===
Climate data for Hinatuan, Surigao del Sur (1991–2020, extremes 1950–2023)
Month	Jan	Feb	Mar	Apr	May	Jun	Jul	Aug	Sep	Oct	Nov	Dec	Year
Record high °C (°F)	35.2 (95.4)	33.5 (92.3)	33.5 (92.3)	36.1 (97.0)	36.6 (97.9)	36.2 (97.2)	37.9 (100.2)	37.5 (99.5)	37.0 (98.6)	36.2 (97.2)	36.0 (96.8)	35.2 (95.4)	37.9 (100.2)
Mean daily maximum °C (°F)	29.6 (85.3)	29.8 (85.6)	30.5 (86.9)	31.5 (88.7)	32.3 (90.1)	32.3 (90.1)	32.5 (90.5)	32.9 (91.2)	32.8 (91.0)	32.4 (90.3)	31.2 (88.2)	30.4 (86.7)	31.5 (88.7)
Daily mean °C (°F)	26.4 (79.5)	26.5 (79.7)	27.0 (80.6)	27.8 (82.0)	28.4 (83.1)	28.3 (82.9)	28.3 (82.9)	28.6 (83.5)	28.4 (83.1)	28.2 (82.8)	27.5 (81.5)	27.0 (80.6)	27.7 (81.9)
Mean daily minimum °C (°F)	23.3 (73.9)	23.2 (73.8)	23.4 (74.1)	24.0 (75.2)	24.5 (76.1)	24.3 (75.7)	24.1 (75.4)	24.2 (75.6)	24.0 (75.2)	24.0 (75.2)	23.8 (74.8)	23.7 (74.7)	23.9 (75.0)
Record low °C (°F)	17.2 (63.0)	18.1 (64.6)	18.2 (64.8)	18.4 (65.1)	20.3 (68.5)	20.2 (68.4)	19.0 (66.2)	19.0 (66.2)	19.1 (66.4)	19.9 (67.8)	19.0 (66.2)	18.8 (65.8)	17.2 (63.0)
Average rainfall mm (inches)	833.0 (32.80)	600.5 (23.64)	451.5 (17.78)	329.7 (12.98)	291.0 (11.46)	269.1 (10.59)	241.2 (9.50)	201.9 (7.95)	189.7 (7.47)	264.3 (10.41)	463.2 (18.24)	626.5 (24.67)	4,761.6 (187.46)
Average rainy days (≥ 0.1 mm)	24	21	21	18	17	16	14	13	12	16	20	23	215
Average relative humidity (%)	88	87	86	84	84	85	83	82	82	84	86	88	85
Source: PAGASA

== Demographics ==
Population census of Hinatuan
Year	Pop.	±% p.a.
1903	5,570	—
1918	13,465	+6.06%
1939	14,722	+0.43%
1948	12,395	−1.89%
1960	21,841	+4.83%
1970	22,578	+0.33%
1975	24,073	+1.29%
1980	27,972	+3.05%
1990	33,307	+1.76%
1995	34,602	+0.72%
2000	36,170	+0.95%
2007	37,368	+0.45%
2010	38,731	+1.31%
2015	39,842	+0.54%
2020	43,841	+2.03%
2024	44,475	+0.35%
Source: Philippine Statistics Authority

== Economy ==
Poverty incidence of Hinatuan (%)

Source: Philippine Statistics Authority

== Tourism ==
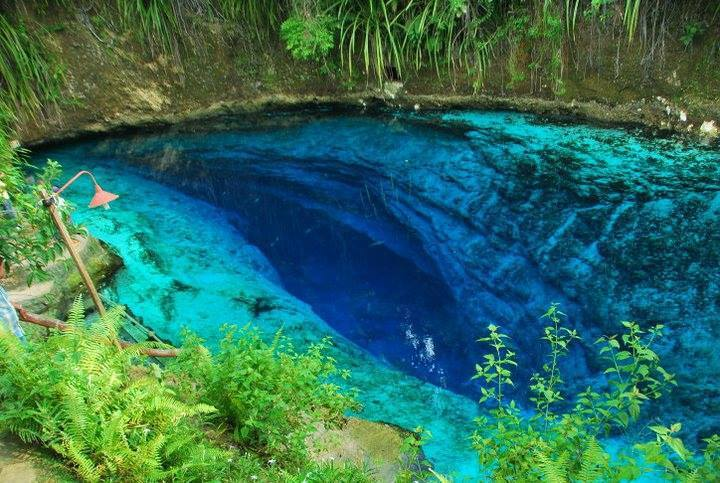
Hinatuan Enchanted River

Clear blue waters of the underground river in Barangay Talisay, Hinatuan, popularly called as the "Hinatuan Enchanted River" is a known attraction among tourists both locally and internationally.
