= 1992 Mindanao earthquakes =

Earthquakes and tsunami affecting the Philippines

- Location within Philippines
- UTC time: 1992-05-17 09:49:19; 1992-05-17 10:15:31
- ISC event: 291773; 291774
- USGS-ANSS: ComCat; ComCat
- Local date: 17 May 1992; 17 May 1992
- Local time: 17:49 PST; 18:15 PST
- Magnitude: M_{w} 7.1; M_{w} 7.5
- Depth: 25.0 km (15.5 mi); 30.0 km (18.6 mi)
- Epicenter: 7.191°N 126.762°E
- Type: Thrust
- Max. intensity: RFS V (Moderate tremor)
- Tsunami: 6 m (20 ft)
- Casualties: 1 dead

Two earthquakes struck off the coast of Mindanao, Philippines, and generated a large tsunami on 17 May 1992. They measured 7.1 and 7.5, respectively on the moment magnitude scale and were spaced 26 minutes apart. Seismic shaking and a tsunami caused damage in Manay, Cateel, Baganga, Boston, Caraga and Tarragona, Davao Oriental Province. At a cove in Manay, the tsunami measured 6 m (20 ft) and flooded about 200 m (660 ft) inland as a result of the amplification effect. Following the first shock, many residents at the cove fled the area after the first earthquake and tsunami, however, a child was killed in the wave. Wave heights of 3 m (9.8 ft) or higher were recorded along the coast of Caraga and Manay. Residents at the coast said the tsunami arrived about 2 to 10 minutes after the first event with the first wave also the largest. Both events occurred on a fault where the Philippine Sea plate subducts beneath the island, with epicenters 20 km (12 mi) apart.

== See also ==
- December 2023 Mindanao earthquake
- List of earthquakes in 1992
- List of earthquakes in the Philippines
