= December 2023 Mindanao earthquake =

Magnitude 7.6 earthquake in the Philippines

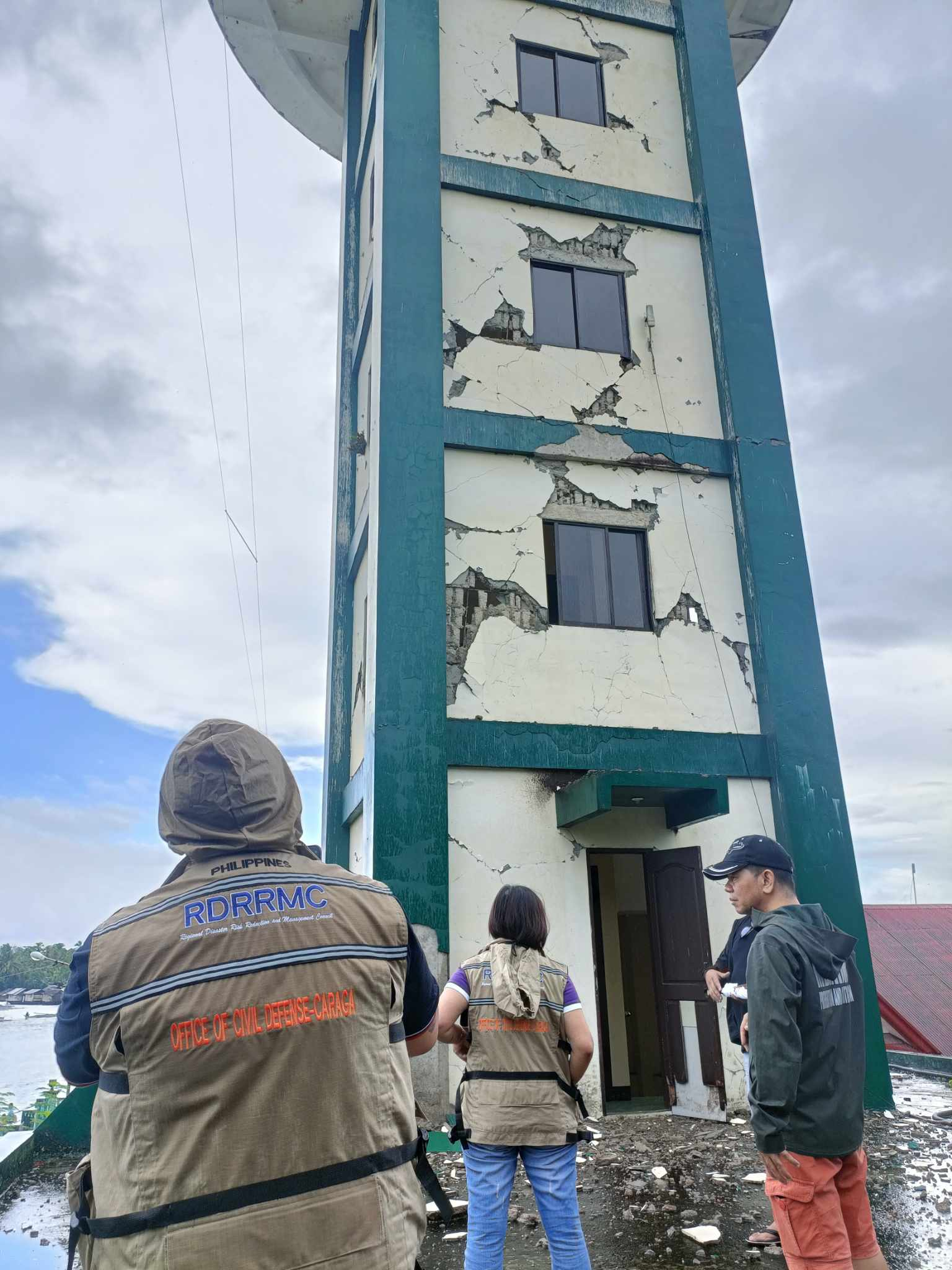
- Damaged PAGASA Doppler weather radar station in Hinatuan Map
- UTC time: 2023-12-02 14:37:04
- ISC event: 636143719
- USGS-ANSS: ComCat
- Local date: December 2, 2023
- Local time: 22:37
- Magnitude: M_{w} 7.4–7.6
- Depth: 40.0 km (24.9 mi)
- Epicenter: 8.527°N 126.416°E
- Type: Oblique-thrust
- Total damage: ₱1.2 billion (US$22.8 million)
- Max. intensity: PEIS VII (MMI VII)
- Tsunami: 64 cm (2.10 ft)
- Aftershocks: 8,403 (425 above M_{w}4.5, as of December 29, 2023); Strongest is M_{w} 6.9
- Casualties: 3 dead, 79 injured

On December 2, 2023, at 22:37 PST (14:37 UTC), a moment magnitude (M_{ww}) 7.6 earthquake occurred off the island of Mindanao in the Philippines. The shallow subduction earthquake killed at least three people and left 79 injured.

== Tectonic setting ==
The Philippine Trench which runs east of the Philippine islands represents a major subduction zone where the Philippine Sea plate subducts westwards. At its southern portion, it runs north–south from the eastern coast of Mindanao to the northern part of Halmahera Island in Indonesia. The convergence rate along the trench varies from 3.2–5.4 cm (1.3–2.1 in) per year. Large earthquakes occurring along the Philippine Trench are limited in records although two large earthquakes were recorded in 1897 (M_{s} 7.3) and 1924 (M_{s} 8.2) with little seismological characteristics known. Some large intraslab earthquakes have been associated with the trench including the M_{w} 7.6 normal-faulting earthquake of 1975 and a reverse-faulting M_{w} 7.6 shock in 2012. The segment involved in the 2023 earthquake was associated with a magnitude 7.5 earthquake in 1921 which produced a tsunami.

== Earthquake ==
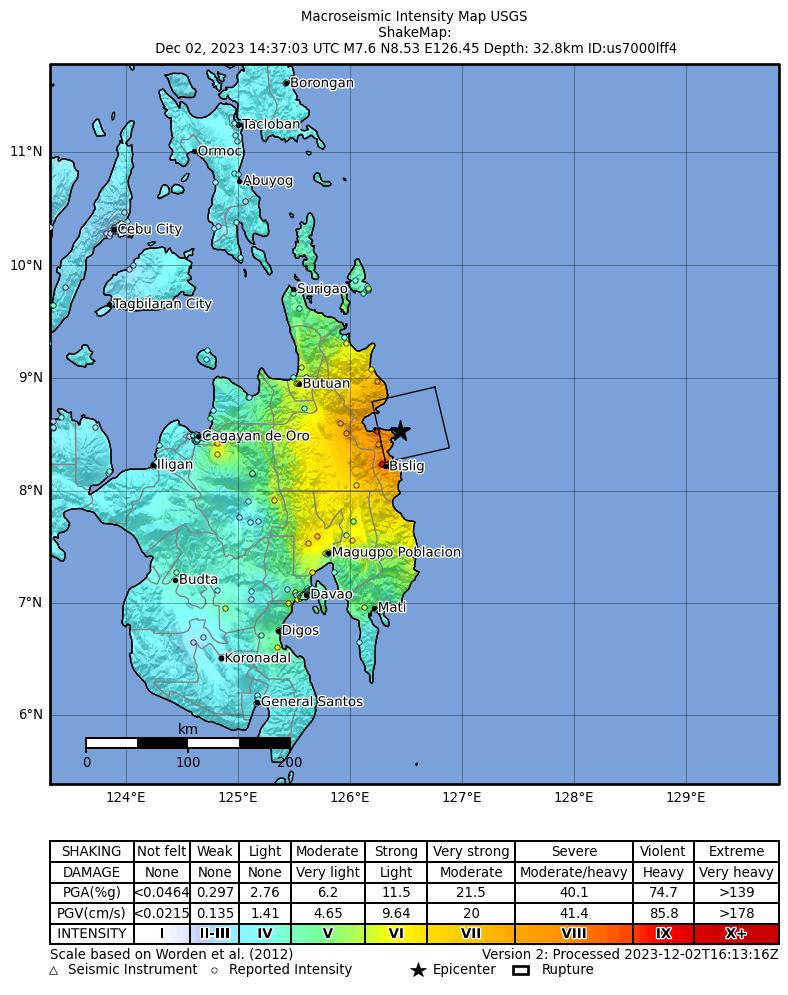
Strong ground motion map produced by the United States Geological Survey

Map of main shock and aftershocks – M 4.0 or greater (map data)

The United States Geological Survey reported the earthquake had a magnitude of 7.6 and a maximum Modified Mercalli intensity of VII (Very strong). The Philippine Institute of Volcanology and Seismology (PHIVOLCS) said it had a magnitude of 7.4 and that it measured VII (Destructive) on the PHIVOLCS earthquake intensity scale in Tandag.

The earthquake occurred as a result of shallow oblique-thrust faulting likely along the subduction interface of the Philippine Trench. At this location, the Philippine Sea plate moves west-northwest at a rate of about 103 mm (4.1 in) per year with respect to the Sunda plate. A finite fault model suggests rupture occurred around an elliptical area measuring 80 km × 80 km (50 mi × 50 mi). Maximum slip was concentrated around the epicenter, although slightly up-dip, which was estimated at up to 1.8 m (5 ft 11 in).

PHIVOLCS recorded 8,403 aftershocks, and within 27 days of the earthquake, 425 aftershocks above M_{w}4.5 were recorded by the USGS; the aftershock sequence occurred southeast of the mainshock. The largest aftershock, measuring 6.9 struck on December 4, occurring north of the aftershock sequence near Cagwait. However, PHIVOLCS said that it was a separate earthquake. On August 2, 2024, two M_{ww}6.8 and 6.3 earthquakes occurred within the area of the 2023 sequence.

The December 2 earthquake was described as the first major earthquake in the area since a doublet 7.1 and 7.5 earthquake that also produced a tsunami in 1992.

== Tsunami ==
Tsunami warnings were issued by PHIVOLCS for the provinces of Surigao del Sur and Davao Oriental, while NHK said tsunami waves up to 1 m (3.3 ft) could hit Japan's southern coast. The Pacific Tsunami Warning Center also said that they expected tsunami waves to be as high as 1–3 m (3.3–9.8 ft) in the Philippines, 0.3–1 m (0.98–3.28 ft) in Palau, and less than 0.3 m (0.98 ft) in American Samoa, China, South Korea, a majority of Polynesia, Melanesia and Micronesia, Hawaii, Indonesia, Japan, Taiwan and Malaysia. The tsunami threat prompted thousands of residents of Ishigaki, Miyako Island, and Futtsu in Japan to evacuate.

In the Philippines, a 64 cm (2.10 ft) high tsunami was observed on Mawes Island. In Davao City, the tsunami reached 8 cm (3.1 in), and in Lawigan, Bislig, it reached 18 cm (7.1 in). A tsunami of 2 cm (0.79 in) was also recorded in Legazpi.

In Japan, the tsunami reached a height of 40 cm (1.3 ft) in Hachijō-jima and 20 cm (0.66 ft) in Kushimoto in Wakayama Prefecture, and Tosashimizu in Kōchi Prefecture. It also reached a height of 1 cm (0.39 in) at Malakal Island, Palau.

== Impact ==
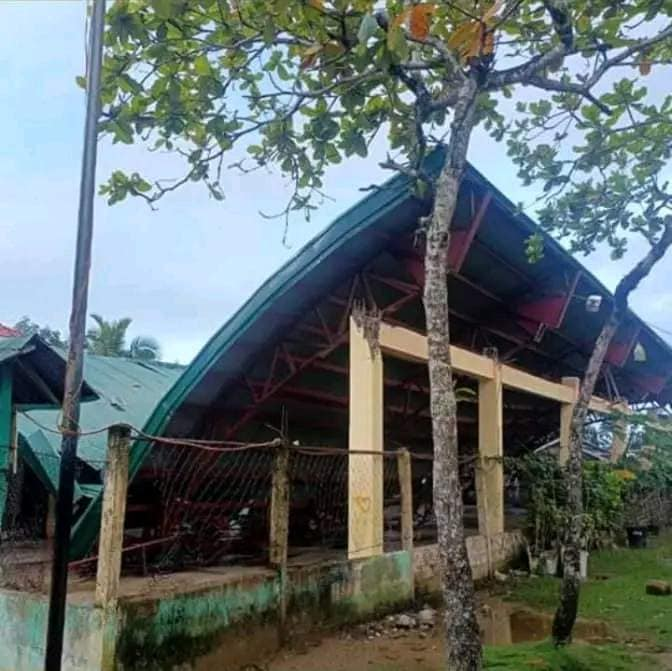
Collapsed building in Hinatuan, Surigao Del Sur

Three deaths were recorded; one in Tagum, one in Barobo and another in Bislig. The deaths were attributed to collapsing concrete walls. Seventy-nine people were injured, including twelve in Davao Region. Additionally, 10,038 houses were damaged, of which 444 were destroyed, costing ₱44 million (US$810,000). Total damage was estimated to be worth ₱133 million (US$2.4 million). At least 399,765 people from 100,174 families were affected, including 100,533 residents who were left homeless, while Surigao del Sur governor Alexander Pimentel ordered the suspension of classes in the affected areas until December 6 and cancelled all Christmas parties in government offices to encourage donations instead.

In Hinatuan, only 12 km (7.5 mi) south of the epicenter, 191 houses collapsed, 1,126 others were damaged and power outages occurred. The town's mayor said 11,000 families, equivalent to 41,000 people were affected, with mud contamination forcing some residents to boil water. A Doppler weather radar monitoring tower in the town operated by the Philippine Atmospheric, Geophysical and Astronomical Services Administration was assessed as "structurally unsafe" after sustaining large cracks and was further sealed off due to its vulnerability to liquefaction. The Enchanted River, the town's main tourist attraction, was closed following a landslide near the area, resulting in losses of at least P200,000 in revenues. The municipal government also reported that damage to housing and infrastructure was estimated at ₱98 million. The town was subsequently placed under a state of calamity.

Minor damage occurred in Butuan, Surigao, Sayak, Tandag and Bislig Airports. Ten houses collapsed and 448 others were damaged in Agusan del Sur, where power was knocked out across the entire province. In Bayugan, two buildings were damaged, including a wall collapse at a store. Several houses and bridges, as well as a mosque were damaged, power outages occurred and people fainted due to the earthquake in Davao City. Patients were evacuated from a hospital in Butuan and a fire broke out in another hospital due to a short circuit. At least 66 houses were destroyed and 1,507 others were damaged in Bislig. Liquefaction destroyed five houses in Gingoog, Misamis Oriental. In Monkayo, Davao de Oro, eight people were injured by a landslide, five houses collapsed and 2,436 others were damaged.

== See also ==
- List of earthquakes in 2023
- List of earthquakes in the Philippines
- 2025 Davao Oriental earthquakes
