= Bataha Santiago =

Third king of Manganitu, ruled 1670–1675

- Third king of Manganitu
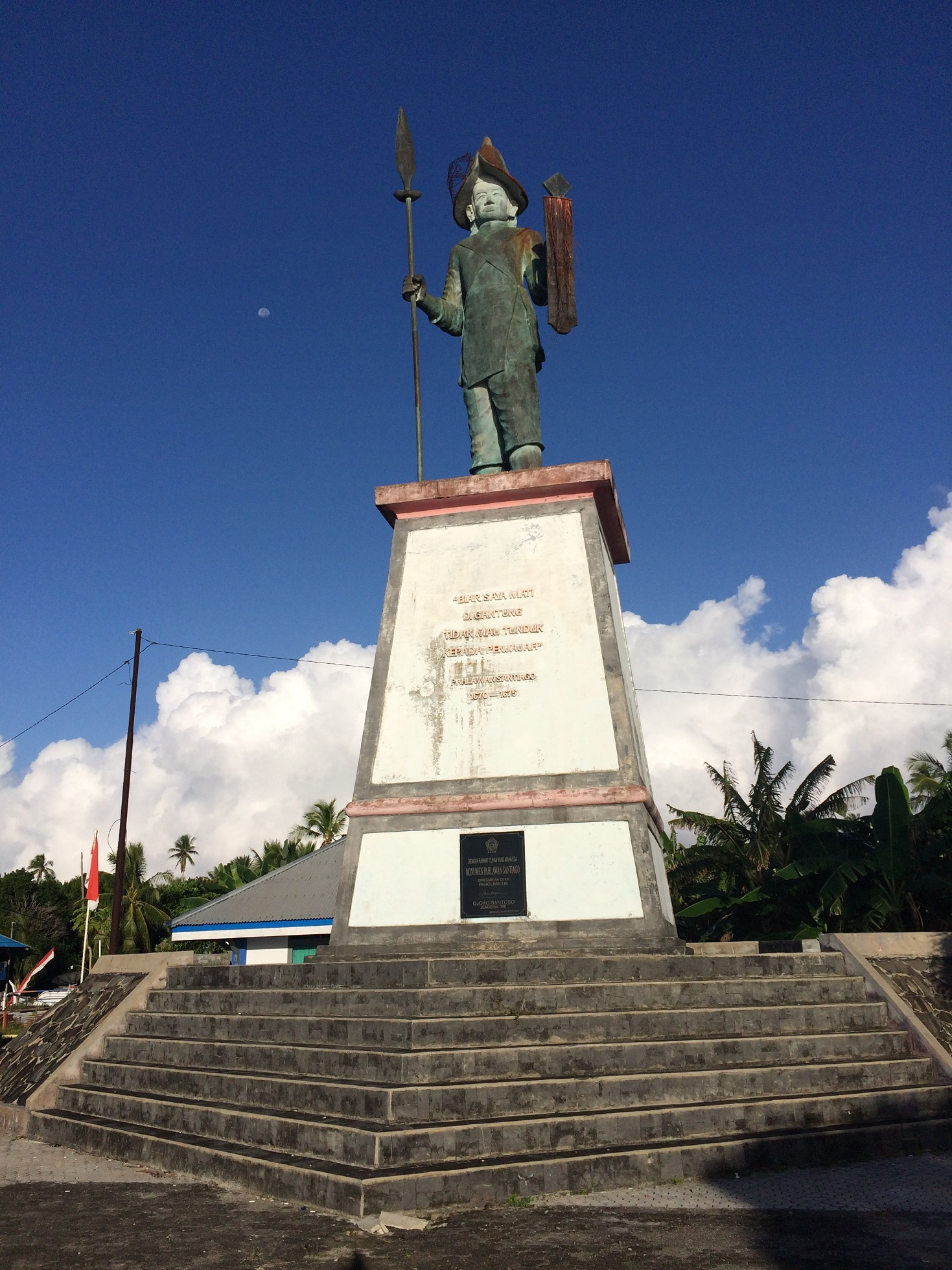
- Bataha Santiago statue in Miangas Island
- Reign: 1670–1675
- Born: Don Jugov Santiago c. 1622; Bowongtiwo-Kauhis, Manganitu
- Died: 1675 (aged 52–53); Tanjung Tahuna
- Burial: Karatung I, Manganitu District, Sangihe Islands Regency
- Religion: Roman Catholic

Don Jugov Santiago, popularly known as Bataha Santiago, was the third king of Manganitu Kingdom in Sangihe Islands of modern-day Indonesia. He ruled from 1670 until his death in 1675 and is known for his opposition to opening relations with the Dutch, which resulted in his deposition and execution. He was awarded title National Hero of Indonesia in 2023.

== Early life ==
Santiago was born in Bowongtiwo-Kawihu village, Manganitu (now part of the Manganitu District), in 1622. There are differing sources regarding his birth name, with some mentioning the shorter "Don Jugov Santiago" while others record it as "Don Jogolov Sint Santiago". Another source claims that his baptismal name was "Don Jugov Santiago". The Kingdom of Manganitu in Sangihe had already embraced Catholicism since its contacts with Jesuits. In 1666, at the age of 44, he was sent by his parents to enroll in the University of Santo Tomas in the Spanish East Indies (present-day Philippines). He finished his studies in four years and returned to Manganitu in 1670 to succeed his father, who had abdicated earlier in the year from his role as king.

== Reign and death ==
Santiago's reign coincided with heavy trade for the region, especially to and from the Spanish East Indies. He maintained close relations with Spain at the time. In 1675, Governor of Dutch East India Company Robertus Padtbrugge approached Santiago to sign trade agreements with the company, which was still based in Maluku at the time. Following Santiago's refusal, the company sent sultans and kings from neighbouring Maluku, including Sultan Kaitjil Sibori, to persuade him into signing the contract. Santiago continued his refusal and later declared war on the company. The war resulted in his defeat; Santiago was eventually hanged in 1675 in Tanjung Tahuna.

== Legacy ==
Santiago is regarded as a hero by locals in North Sulawesi, especially by those in the smaller region of islands known collectively as Nusa Utara. Korem 131/Santiago, an Indonesian military command based in Manado under Kodam XIII/Merdeka, is named for him. His grave was rediscovered in 1950. Several places, especially those in Sangihe Islands Regency, are named after him, including Gelora Santiago Field in town of Tahuna, and the urban village (kelurahan) of Santiago within the town. A statue of him was built in 2009 on the northernmost island of Indonesia, Miangas, by the government. He was nominated to be a National Hero of Indonesia by the North Sulawesi provincial government, which was accepted and awarded on 10 November 2023 by Joko Widodo.
