= Manay, Davao Oriental =

Municipality in Davao Oriental, Philippines

Manay Lungsod sa Manay Bayan ng Manay
- Municipality
- Municipality of Manay
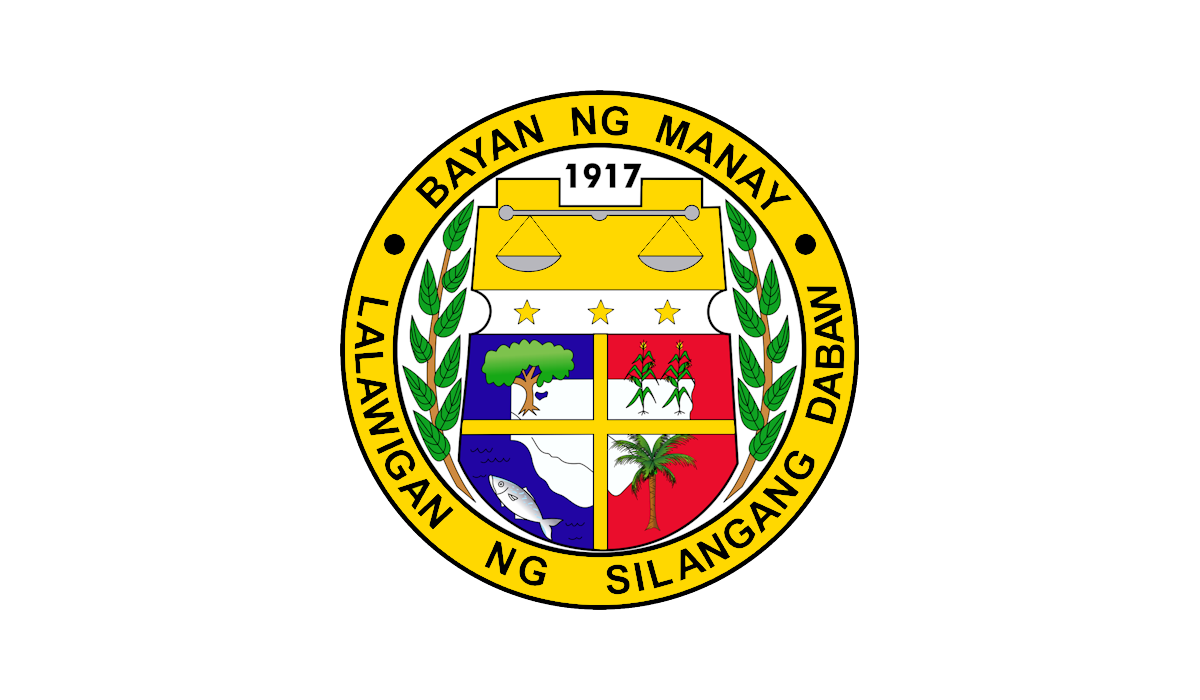
- Flag Seal

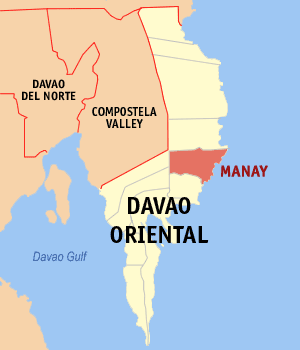
- Map of Davao Oriental with Manay highlighted
- Interactive map of Manay
- Location within the Philippines
- Coordinates: 7°12′40″N 126°32′22″E
- Country: Philippines
- Region: Davao Region
- Province: Davao Oriental
- District: 1st district
- Founded: 1917
- Barangays: 17 (see Barangays)

Government
  - Type: Sangguniang Bayan
  - Mayor: Jon Marco Dayanghirang
  - Vice Mayor: Alfonso Benjie Dela Cruz Lahora
  - Representative: Nelson L. Dayanghirang, Jr.
  - Municipal Council: Members: Jon Marco M. Dayanghirang; Manuel M. Lepardo Jr.; Rudy S. Rosa; Elmer P. Panuayan; Melencio P. Silveron Jr.; Levy Joe P. Lumando; Jesus L. Mamparo Jr.
  - Electorate: 30,779 voters (2025)

Area
  - Total: 418.36 km^{2} (161.53 sq mi)
- Elevation: 313 m (1,027 ft)
- Highest elevation: 2,658 m (8,720 ft)
- Lowest elevation: 0 m (0 ft)

Population (2024 census)
  - Total: 39,271
  - Density: 93.869/km^{2} (243.12/sq mi)
  - Households: 9,480

Economy
  - Income class: 1st municipal income class
  - Poverty incidence: 38.16% (2023)
  - Revenue: ₱ 259.9 million (2024)
  - Assets: ₱ 558.4 million (2024)
  - Expenditure: ₱ 257.3 million (2024)
  - Liabilities: ₱ 209 million (2024)

Service provider
  - Electricity: Davao Oriental Electric Cooperative (DORECO)
- Time zone: UTC+8 (PST)
- ZIP code: 8202
- PSGC: 1102508000
- IDD : area code: +63 (0)87
- Native languages: Davawenyo; Surigaonon; Cebuano; Kalagan; Kamayo; Mandaya
- Website: manay.gov.ph

Manay ([mɐnaɪ], also spelled Man-ay), officially the Municipality of Manay (Mandaya: Banwa nang Manay), is a first class municipality in the province of Davao Oriental, Philippines. According to the 2024 census, it has a population of 39,271 people. The epicenter of the 2025 Davao Oriental earthquakes was recorded off the coast of Manay.

== Geography ==
=== Climate ===
Manay has a tropical rainforest climate (Af) with heavy to very heavy rainfall year-round.

Climate data for Manay
Month	Jan	Feb	Mar	Apr	May	Jun	Jul	Aug	Sep	Oct	Nov	Dec	Year
Mean daily maximum °C (°F)	30.3 (86.5)	30.3 (86.5)	31.3 (88.3)	31.9 (89.4)	31.9 (89.4)	31.4 (88.5)	31.3 (88.3)	31.6 (88.9)	31.8 (89.2)	31.9 (89.4)	31.6 (88.9)	30.8 (87.4)	31.3 (88.4)
Daily mean °C (°F)	26.0 (78.8)	26.0 (78.8)	26.7 (80.1)	27.2 (81.0)	27.4 (81.3)	27.0 (80.6)	26.9 (80.4)	27.1 (80.8)	27.1 (80.8)	27.3 (81.1)	27.0 (80.6)	26.5 (79.7)	26.9 (80.3)
Mean daily minimum °C (°F)	21.8 (71.2)	21.8 (71.2)	22.1 (71.8)	22.6 (72.7)	23.0 (73.4)	22.7 (72.9)	22.5 (72.5)	22.6 (72.7)	22.5 (72.5)	22.7 (72.9)	22.5 (72.5)	22.3 (72.1)	22.4 (72.4)
Average rainfall mm (inches)	422 (16.6)	323 (12.7)	252 (9.9)	182 (7.2)	156 (6.1)	136 (5.4)	122 (4.8)	106 (4.2)	100 (3.9)	153 (6.0)	184 (7.2)	323 (12.7)	2,459 (96.7)
Source: Climate-Data.org

=== Barangays ===
Manay is politically subdivided into 17 barangays. Each barangay consists of puroks while some have sitios.

- Capasnan
- Cayawan
- Central (Poblacion)
- Concepcion
- Del Pilar
- Guza
- Holy Cross
- Lambog
- Mabini
- Manreza
- New Taokanga
- Old Macopa
- Rizal
- San Fermin
- San Ignacio
- San Isidro
- Zaragosa

== Demographics ==
Population census of Manay
Year	Pop.	±% p.a.
1918	5,335	—
1939	11,528	+3.74%
1948	11,097	−0.42%
1960	15,813	+2.99%
1970	21,114	+2.93%
1975	24,304	+2.86%
1980	25,534	+0.99%
1990	33,686	+2.81%
1995	35,428	+0.95%
2000	36,697	+0.76%
2007	38,067	+0.51%
2010	40,577	+2.35%
2015	42,690	+0.97%
2020	39,572	−1.58%
2024	39,271	−0.18%
Source: Philippine Statistics Authority

== Economy ==
Poverty incidence of Manay (%)

Source: Philippine Statistics Authority

The Municipality of Manay have poverty incidence, covering 37.07% of the GDP per capita.
