= Sangihe Islands Regency =

Regency in North Sulawesi, Indonesia

Sangihe Islands Regency Kabupaten Kepulauan Sangihe
- Regency
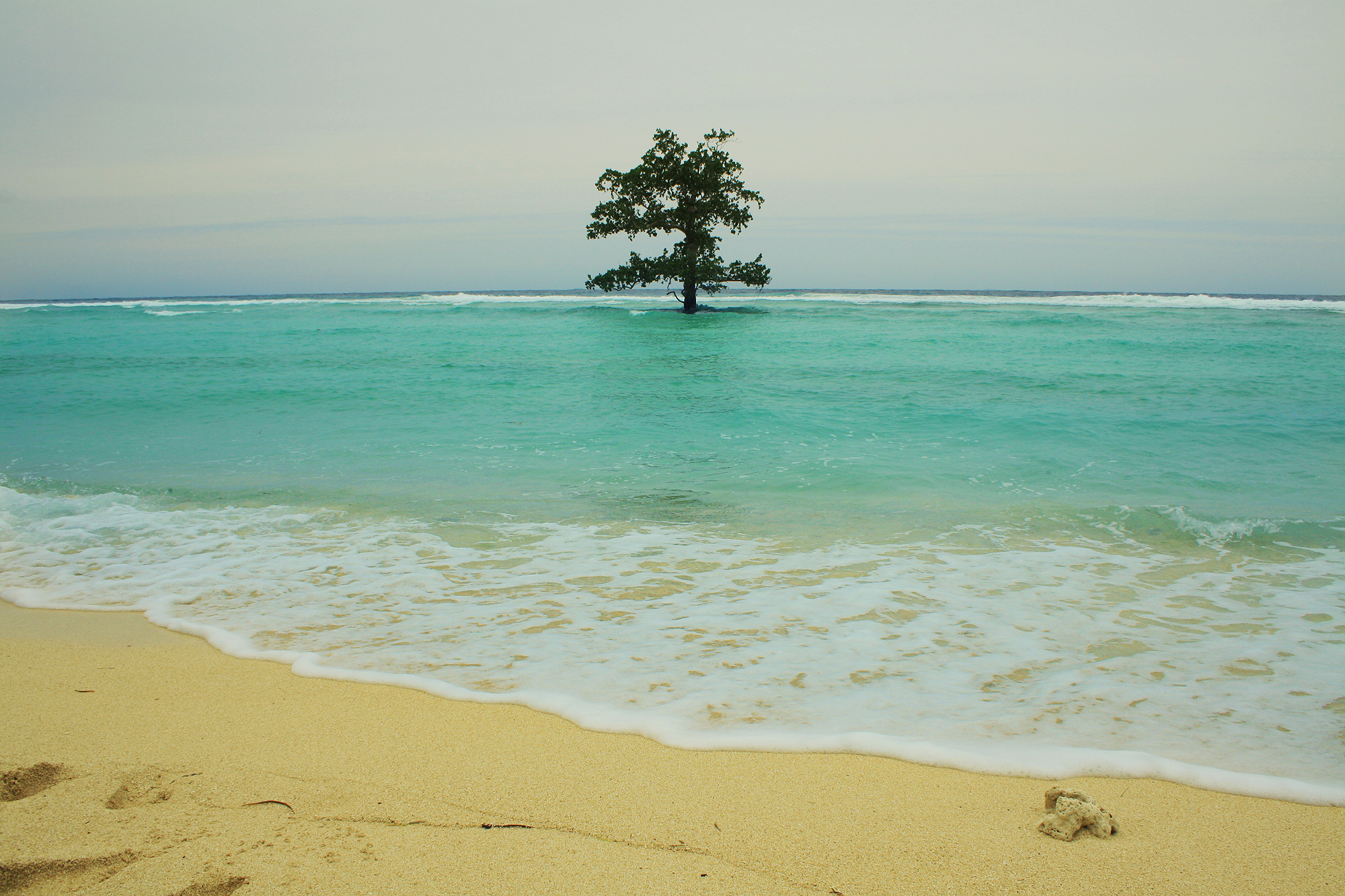
- Panoramio of Marore beach in Marore Island

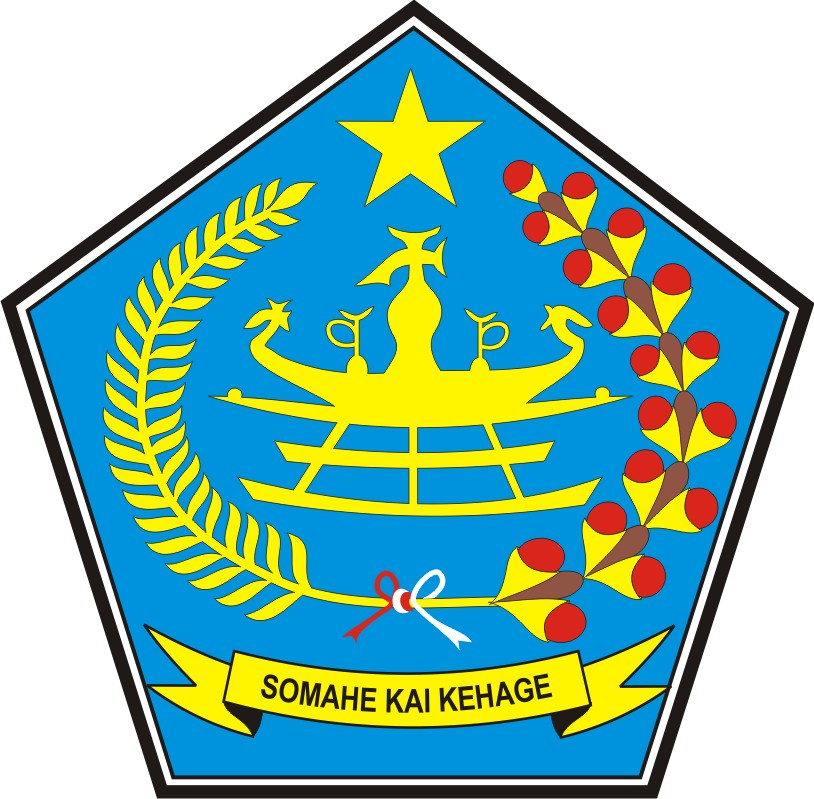
- Seal
- Motto: Somahe Kai Kehage
- Location within North Sulawesi

- Location in Sulawesi and Indonesia Sangihe Islands Regency (Indonesia)
- Coordinates: 03°00′N 125°30′E
- Country: Indonesia
- Province: North Sulawesi
- Capital: Tahuna

Government
  - Regent: Michael Thungari
  - Vice Regent: Tendris Bulahari

Area
  - Total: 736.98 km^{2} (284.55 sq mi)

Population (mid 2025 estimate)
  - Total: 136,393
  - Density: 185.07/km^{2} (479.33/sq mi)
- Time zone: UTC+8 (Indonesia Central Time)
- Area code: (+62) 432
- HDI (2019): ▲0.705 (High)
- Website: sangihekab.go.id

The Sangihe Islands Regency (Indonesian: Kabupaten Kepulauan Sangihe) is a regency of North Sulawesi Province, Indonesia. It comprises a group of islands situated to the North of Sulawesi. It covers a land area of 736.98 km^{2}, and had a population of 126,100 at the 2010 census and 139,262 at the 2020 census; the official estimate as at mid 2025 was 136,393 (comprising 69,456 males and 66,937 females). The principal island is also named Sangihe or Sangir, on which lies the main town of Tahuna. Minor island groups within the Regency include the Marore group which lies considerably to the north of Sangihe Island, the Tatoareng group to the south, and the Nusa Tabukan group off the northeast coast of Sangihe Island. It borders the Municipality of Sarangani of the Philippines in the north, making it one of Indonesia's border regions.

== History ==
Prior to rapid decentralization after the fall of Suharto, all of the archipelago to the north of the Minahasa Peninsula was administered as a single regency named Sangihe Islands and Talaud Regency. On 10 April 2002, it was split into two regencies, one for the Sangihe Islands and the other for the Talaud Islands, based on Law Number 8 of 2002. On 2 January 2007, several islands from the southern part of Sangihe Islands Regency were split off to create another new regency – the Sitaro Islands Regency – giving the Sangihe Islands its current status based on Law Number 15 of 2007.

It is believed that inhabitants of the Sangihe Islands migrated from the Philippines archipelago, especially from Mindanao. The culture of the native people in the islands has been influenced by Hinduism, Buddhism, and later, when the region was under Spanish hegemony, Christianity such as Kingdom of Manganitu under Bataha Santiago. Several native kingdoms existed such as Kendar Kingdom and Tabukan Kingdom, which later in the 18th and 19th centuries were described as partly influenced by Islam.

== Geography ==
Total area of the regency including water area is 11,863.58 square kilometres, from which only 736.98 square kilometres are land or 6.2% of total area of the regency. It is divided into 15 districts (kecamatan), the biggest being North Tabukan district, consisting of 15.82% of the regency's total land area and the smallest being Nusa Tabukan district with only 2% of total land area in the regency.

Topography of the islands mostly consists of hills and steep topography for bigger islands such as Sangihe and Siau. Around 55.4% of land area in the regency has slope above 40%. Soil composition consist of alluvium, which mostly used for residential areas. Elevation varies from 0 to 1,800 metres above sea level depending on the location. Main economic center of the regency, Tahuna, has average elevation of 250 metres above sea level. The regency has three active volcanoes, and experiences frequent earthquakes. Two of the three volcanoes are underwater. The region is quite resilient to erosion because of dense vegetation usually found on its coastal region, while most human settlements are found on higher altitudes in the middle of islands. However, because of its steep topography, the region is prone to landslides especially during bad weather.

As with most regions in Indonesia the Regency has a tropical climate and is affected by monsoons, with the rainy season experienced between September and November. Annual rainfall varies, depending on the island, from 2,500 to above 3,000 millimetres per year. There is little variation to temperature yearly, on average between 26 and 28 Celsius in the entire year. The region experiences high moisture levels ranging between 81 and 87% with average yearly of 83.6%.

== Governance ==
=== Administrative districts ===
The regency is divided into fifteen districts (kecamatan), listed below with their areas and their populations at the 2010 census and the 2020 census, together with the official estimates as at mid 2025. The table also includes the locations of the district administrative centres, the number of administrative villages in each district (totaling 145 rural desa and 22 urban kelurahan - the latter all in the three districts comprising the town of Tahuna), the number of islands in each district, and its post code.

Regional Code	Name of District (kecamatan)	Area in km^{2}	Pop'n census 2010	Pop'n census 2020	Pop'n estimate mid 2025	Administrative center	No. of villages	No. of islands	Postal code
71.03.10	South Manganitu	73.99	9,902	11,199	10,506	Lapango	13	22	95854
71.03.11	Tatoareng ^{(a)}	18.56	4,358	4,966	4,718	Kahakitang	7	22	95851
71.03.12	Tamako	69.42	12,991	14,256	13,975	Pokol	20	10	95855
71.03.15	South Tabukan	68.76	5,860	6,635	6,310	Lesabe I	14	16	95858
71.03.20	Central South Tabukan	46.84	2,107	2,945	2,932	Salurang	6	-	95850
71.03.19	Southeast South Tabukan	22.29	2,708	2,635	2,557	Pintareng	9	-	95859
71.03.14	Central Tabukan	87.39	10,297	11,978	11,693	Kuma	18	-	95857
71.03.13	Manganitu	66.46	13,904	15,145	14,698	Mala	18	4	95853
71.03.17	Tahuna	25.76	15,948	16,709	16,246	Bungalawang	8 ^{(b)}	1	95811 - 95813
71.03.24	East Tahuna	25.15	12,377	12,653	12,263	Tona I	8 ^{(c)}	-	95812, 95814 - 95816
71.03.23	West Tahuna	40.66	5,443	5,945	5,908	Mitung	6 ^{(d)}	-	95811, 95815, 95817, 95818
71.03.08	North Tabukan	114.76	19,452	22,009	22,316	Bengketang	24	10	95856
71.03.09	Nusa Tabukan ^{(e)}	14.73	2,919	3,335	3,427	Nipa	5	15	95842
71.03.25	Kepulauan Marore (Marore Islands) ^{(f)}	11.02	1,371	1,643	1,615	Marore	3	?	95841
71.03.16	Kendahe	51.19	6,463	7,209	7,229	Kendahe Satu	8	6	95852
	Totals	736.98	126,100	139,262	136,393	Tahuna			

Notes: (a) comprises a group of 21 islands lying to the south of Sangihe Island.
(b) all 8 are urban kelurahan - Apeng Sembeka, Bungalawang, Mahena, Manente, Santiago, Sawang Bendar, Soataloara I and Soataloara II.
(c) all 8 are kelurahan - Batulewehe, Dumuhung, Enengpahembang, Lesa, Tapuang, Tidore, Tona I and Tona II.
(d) all 6 are kelurahan - Akembawi, Angges, Kolongan Beha, Kolongan Beha Baru, Kolongan Mitung and Pananekeng.
(e) notwithstanding the name of "Tabukan Island", this district actually comprises a group of 16 islands off the northeast coast of Sangihe Island. (f) comprises a group of islands lying to the north of Sangihe Island.

=== Local government ===
The Regency is a second-level administrative division, equivalent to a city. As a regency, it is headed by a regent who is elected democratically. Meanwhile, heads of districts are appointed directly by the regent with the recommendation of regency secretary. Executive power lies with the regent and vice regent while legislative function is overseen by regency's parliament. The last regency election was held in 2024.

=== Politics ===
The regency is part of the 3rd North Sulawesi electoral district at the provincial level, which has 5 out of 45 representatives in the provincial parliament. At a regency level, it is divided into three electoral districts and has a total of 25 representatives. The last election was in 2019 and the next one will be in 2024.

Electoral District	Region	Representatives
Sangihe Islands 1st	Kendahe, Tahuna, West Tahuna, and East Tahuna districts	8
Sangihe Islands 2nd	Marore Islands, Nusa Tabukan, South Tabukan, Central South Tabukan, Southeast South Tabukan, and Central Tabukan districts	9
Sangihe Islands 3rd	Manganitu, South Manganitu, Tamako, and Tatoareng districts	8
Total		25

== Economy ==
Main economic activity in the regency is fisheries, which contributes to 27.96% of its gross regional product. Other biggest sectors are trade with 15.33% and administration service with 12.33%. Other significant industries include construction, warehouse, and financial and insurance services. There has been a sharp decline in agricultural output, such as ginger production from 6,499 kilograms in 2019 to 2,887 in 2020 and galanga from 2,562 to 1,215. Other than agriculture and fisheries, the regency also produces various fruits such as jackfruit with output of 494.3 tons, banana with output of 232.96 tons, and mango with output of 112.96 tons in 2020. Biggest livestock population in the regency is pig with population of 10.459. Fastest growing sector in 2020 was the communication sector with growth of 9.90% followed by financial and insurance with 9.48%. Economic growth in 2019 was 5.43%, which however decreased sharply to 0.50% in 2020 because of COVID-19 pandemic.

== Demographics ==
As with most of the Indonesian regions, it has a young population dominated by those above 15 years old. Sex ratio in the regency in 2020 was 104, which means there are 104 male for every 100 female population. Population growth is 1%, where the fastest growing district is Central South Tabukan District with a population growth of 2.26% in 2020. 67,654 people out of the population is considered economically active by Statistics Indonesia. Literacy rate in 2020 was 98.93% and life expectancy was 70 years. 83% of the regency population are Protestants, followed by 16% of Muslims, 0.84% of Catholics, and 0.01% of other religions such as Hindu and Buddhism.

== Infrastructure ==
Education infrastructure in the regency includes 90 kindergartens, 207 elementary schools, 62 junior high schools, 18 senior high schools, and 9 vocational high schools. There are several higher education institutions, including state-owned Nusa Utara Polytech, Didaskalos Christianity College of Sangihe, and Monetary & Banking GMIST Academy. The regency is the most developed in terms of education infrastructure compared to the other two island regencies around it, Talaud and Sitaro Islands Regency. Nusa Utara Polytech was expanded and new building inaugurated in 2021. It created 2,556 graduates in 2020 and offered diploma in nursery, fishery-related programs such as maritime resources management, and computer and communication. It was created first in 2006 with assistance of Ratulangi University and the Ministry of Education and Culture in a previously regency-owned nursery academy and has since been expanded.

Healthcare facilities including a hospital, two polyclinics, 91 puskesmas, and 10 pharmacies. In addition, there are 21 family planning clinics. Liun Kendage Regional Hospital is the main healthcare facility in the region with facility of 200 beds as of 2016. In 2020, the hospital underwent a major expansion including construction of a new building. It is a referral hospital for nearby regions and especially for regions closer to the Indonesian border such as Sitaro Islands Regency and Talaud Islands Regency. The expansion is expected to finish on 2022. There are exactly 137 mosques, 558 Protestant churches, and 8 Catholic churches in the regency as of 2020.

The total road length in the regency is 782.92 kilometers, out of which 569.72 kilometers have been sealed and paved with asphalt. The regency is served by Naha Airport which facilitated 22,414 passengers in 2020. Being an archipelago, water transport is important for movement within the regency and to outside regions. In 2020, there were 902 ships in and out of the regency with 285,861 total number of passengers both in and out. The regency is served by Sea Toll Program to help reduce price disparity in the region. Tahuna Port is the main port for the regency, located in Tahuna. It serves both passengers and containers in and out of the regency. It serves movement of around 31,450 tons of goods in and out. The port underwent an expansion in 2019 and construction was expected to finish in 2021. Other than that, the port also serves as a route to the Philippines.
