= Tahuna, North Sulawesi =

Tahuna
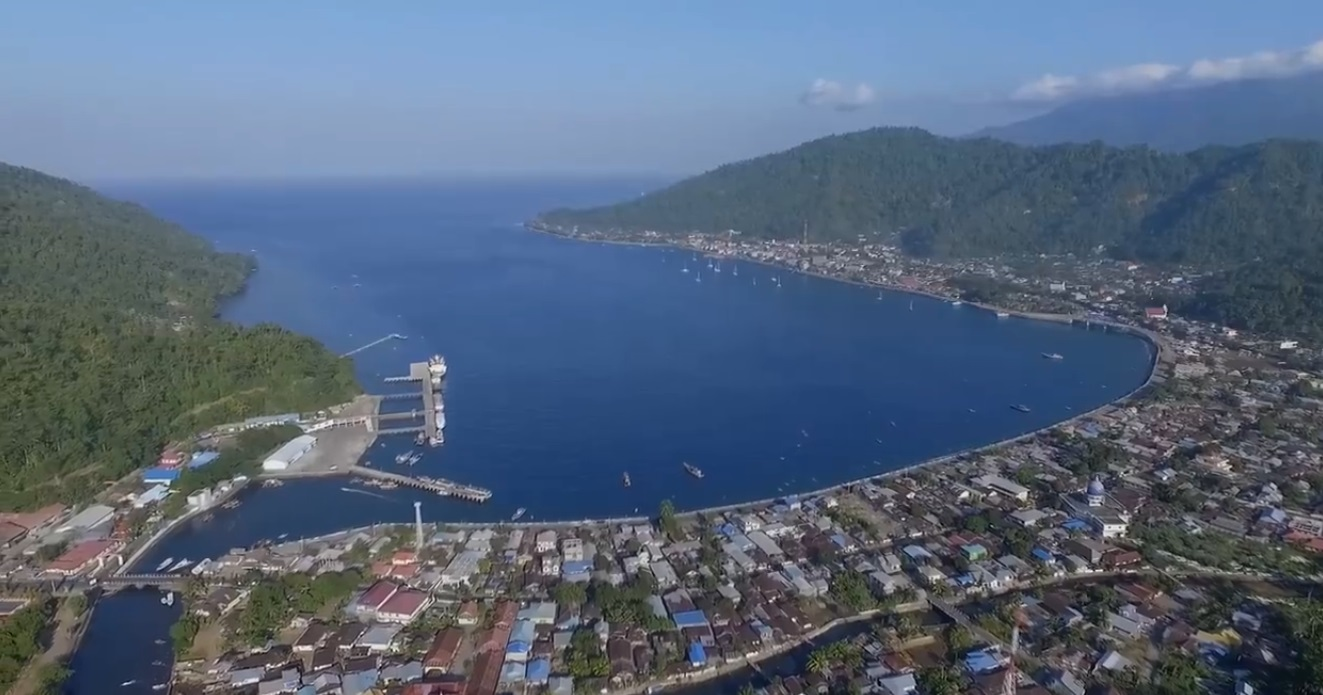
- Aerial view of Tahuna

- Location in North Sulawesi and Indonesia Tahuna (Indonesia)
- Coordinates: 3°36′42.7176″N 125°30′2.7504″E
- Country: Indonesia
- Province: North Sulawesi
- Regency: Sangihe Islands Regency
- Elevation: 39 ft (12 m)

Population (2020 Census)
  - Total: 35,307
- Time zone: UTC+8 (Indonesia Central Standard Time)

Tahuna is a town and the capital of Sangihe Islands Regency in North Sulawesi province, Indonesia. It stretches across the administrative districts (kecamatan) of Tahuna, Tahuna Timur and Tahuna Barat, with a combined population of 35,307 at the 2020 Census.

== Climate ==
Tahuna has a tropical rainforest climate (Af) with heavy to very heavy rainfall year-round.

Climate data for Tahuna
Month	Jan	Feb	Mar	Apr	May	Jun	Jul	Aug	Sep	Oct	Nov	Dec	Year
Mean daily maximum °C (°F)	30.6 (87.1)	30.6 (87.1)	31.1 (88.0)	31.8 (89.2)	31.5 (88.7)	31.1 (88.0)	30.8 (87.4)	31.5 (88.7)	31.6 (88.9)	31.8 (89.2)	31.4 (88.5)	30.9 (87.6)	31.2 (88.2)
Daily mean °C (°F)	26.3 (79.3)	26.2 (79.2)	26.6 (79.9)	27.1 (80.8)	27.1 (80.8)	26.7 (80.1)	26.4 (79.5)	26.9 (80.4)	26.8 (80.2)	27.0 (80.6)	26.8 (80.2)	26.6 (79.9)	26.7 (80.1)
Mean daily minimum °C (°F)	22.0 (71.6)	21.9 (71.4)	22.1 (71.8)	22.4 (72.3)	22.7 (72.9)	22.4 (72.3)	22.1 (71.8)	22.3 (72.1)	22.1 (71.8)	22.3 (72.1)	22.3 (72.1)	22.3 (72.1)	22.2 (72.0)
Average precipitation mm (inches)	414 (16.3)	299 (11.8)	307 (12.1)	295 (11.6)	312 (12.3)	294 (11.6)	293 (11.5)	210 (8.3)	215 (8.5)	276 (10.9)	376 (14.8)	402 (15.8)	3,693 (145.5)
Source: Climate-Data.org
