= Naga, Camarines Sur =

Highly urbanized city in Bicol Region, Philippines

Naga
- Highly urbanized city
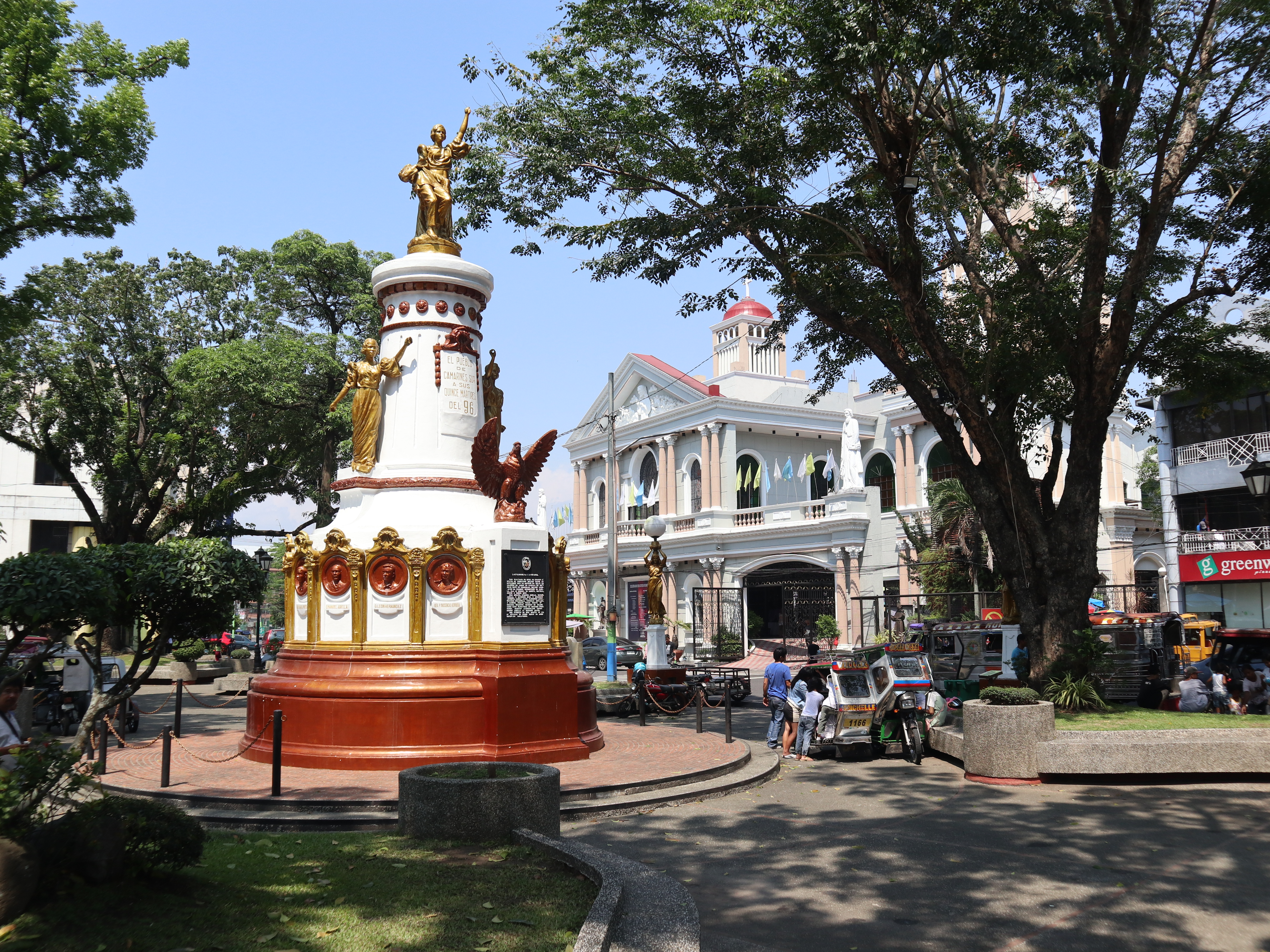
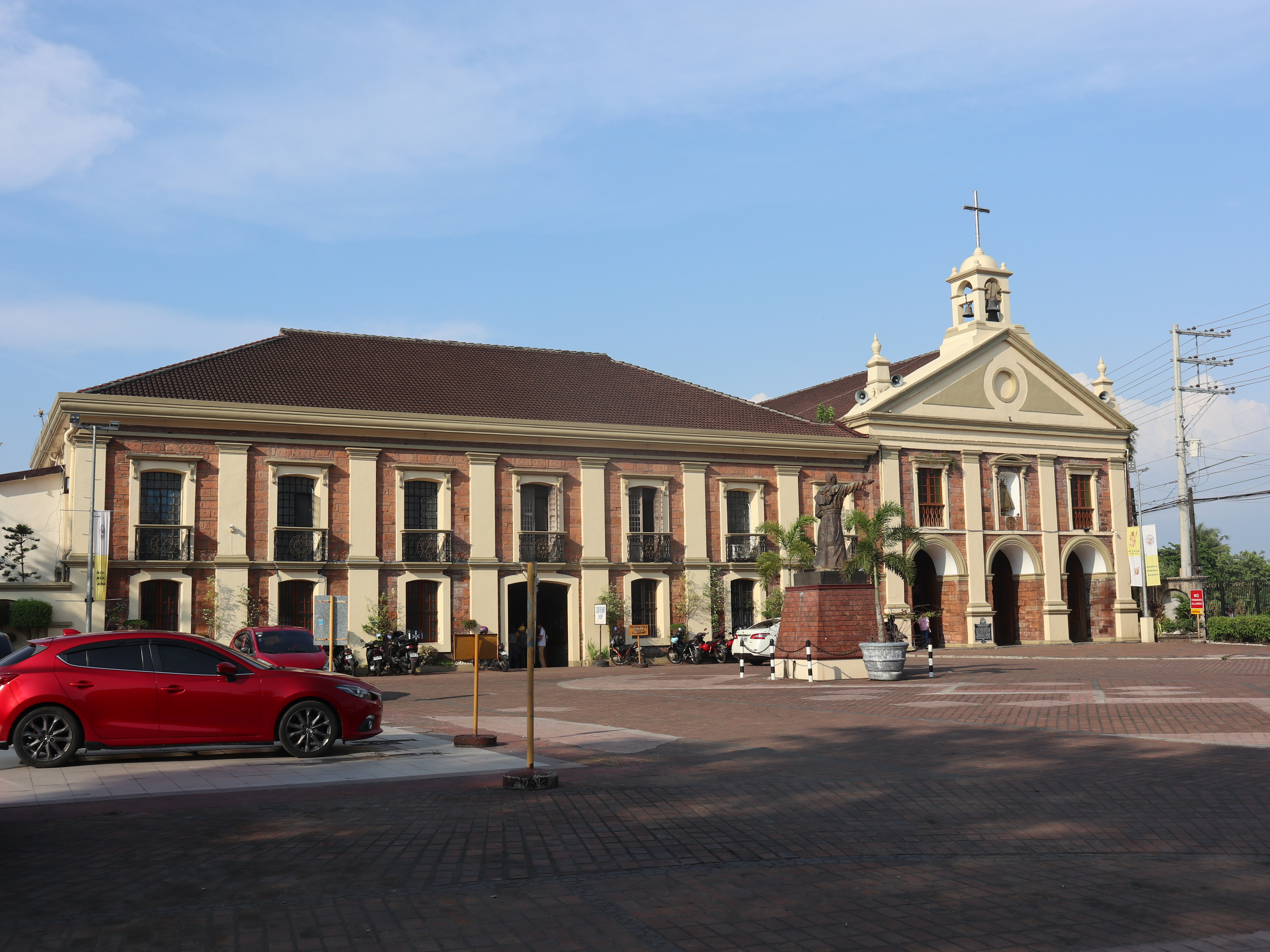
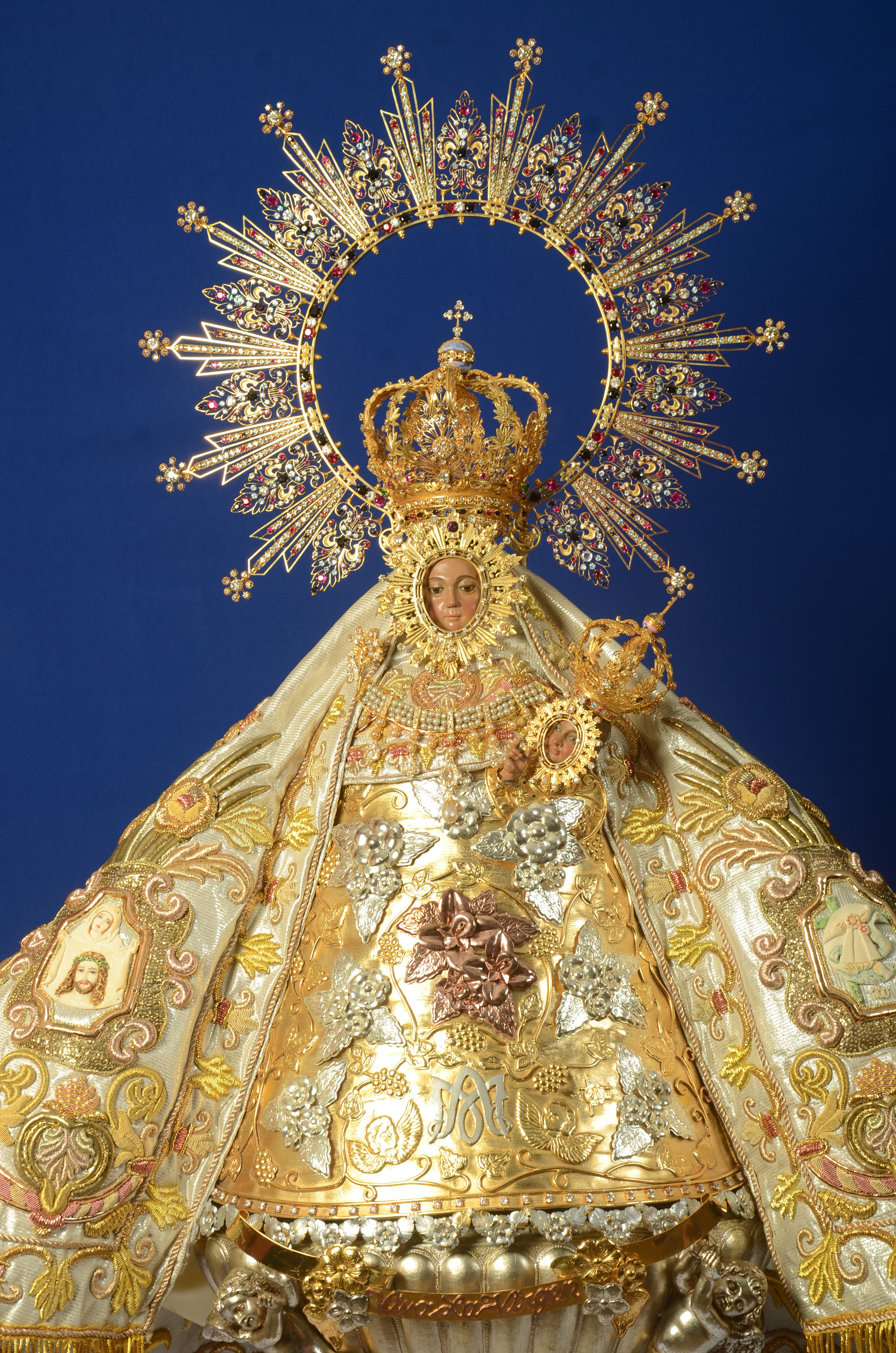
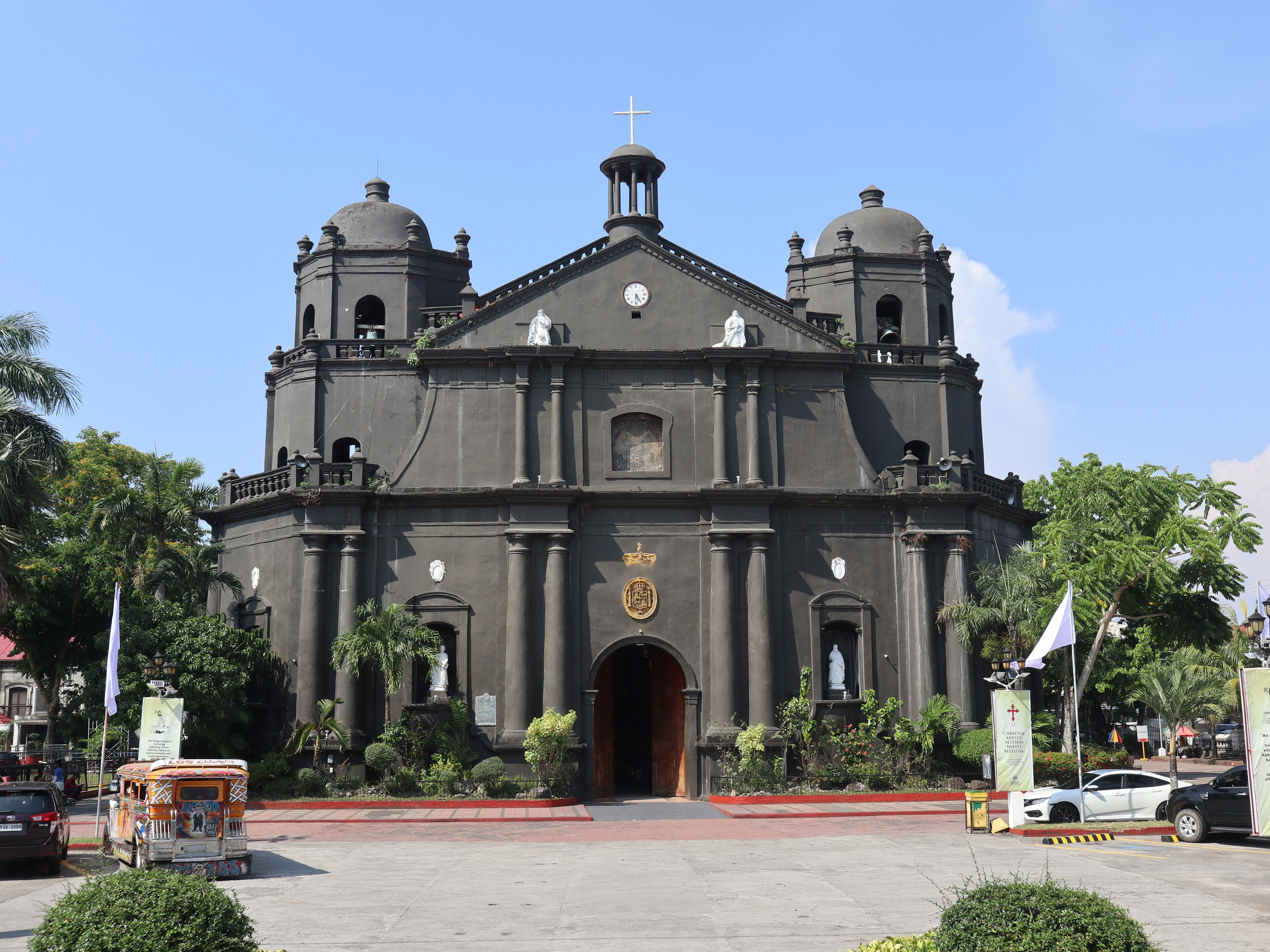
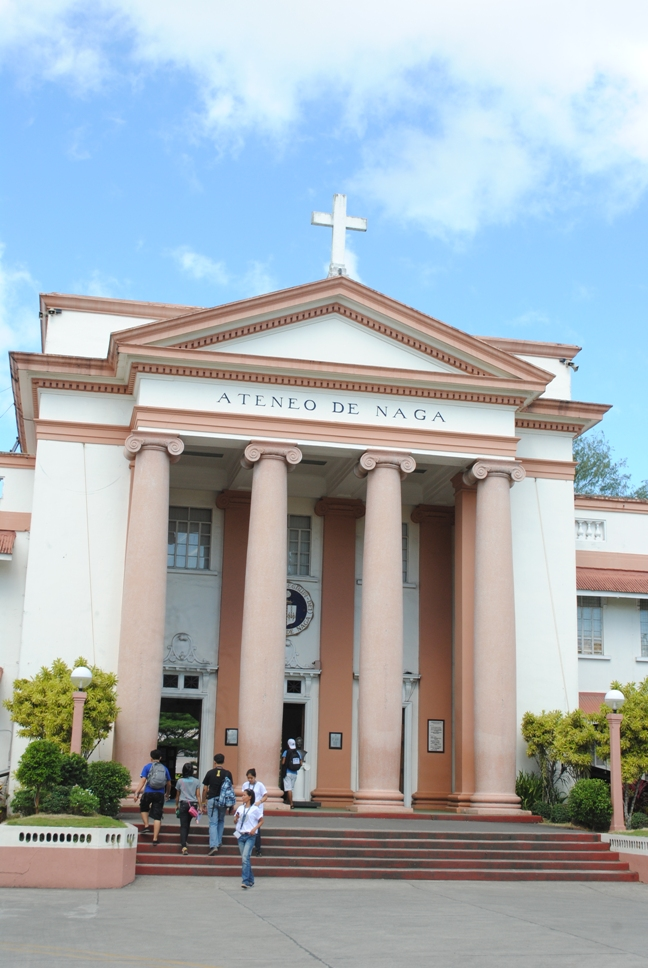
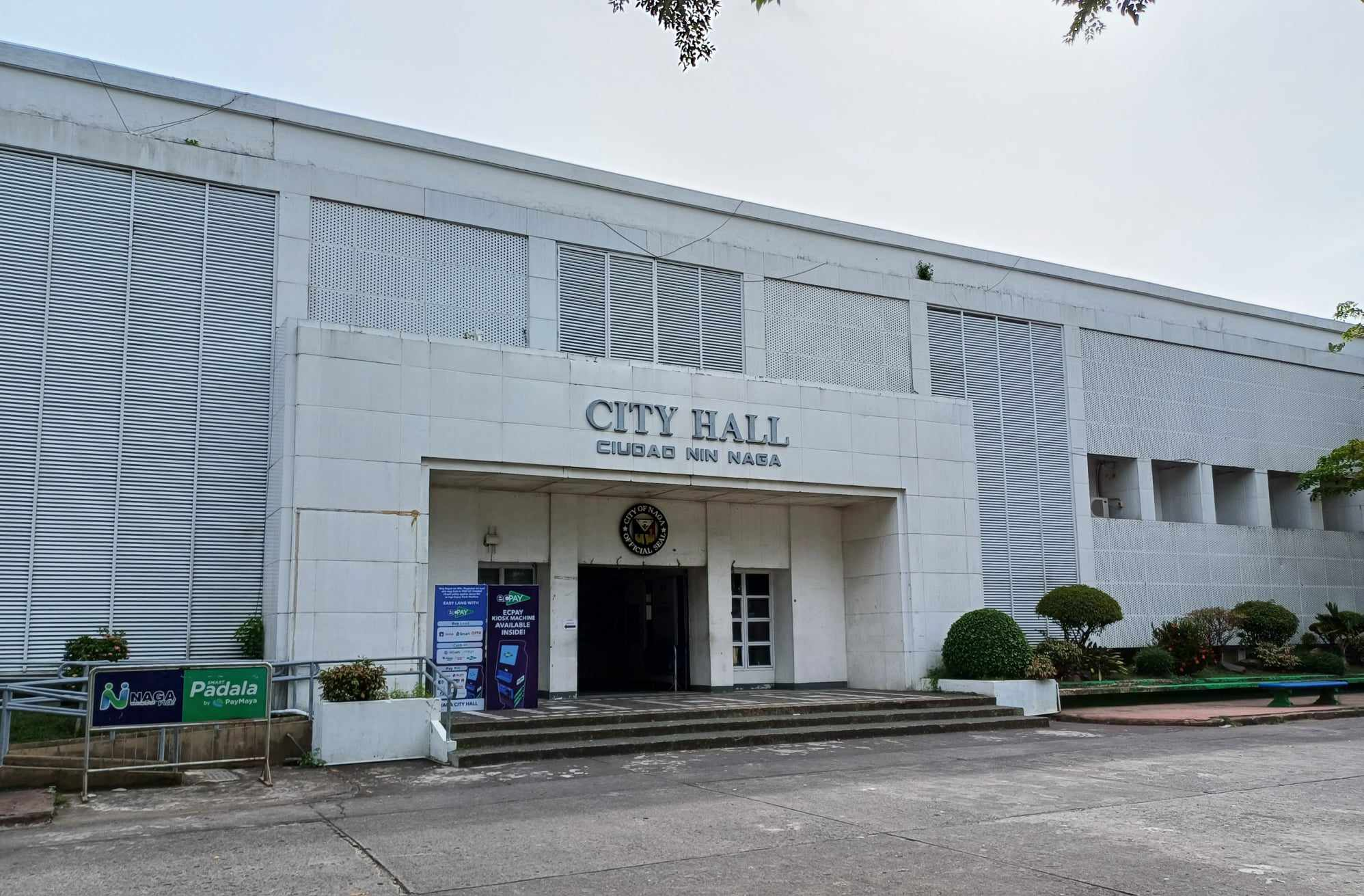
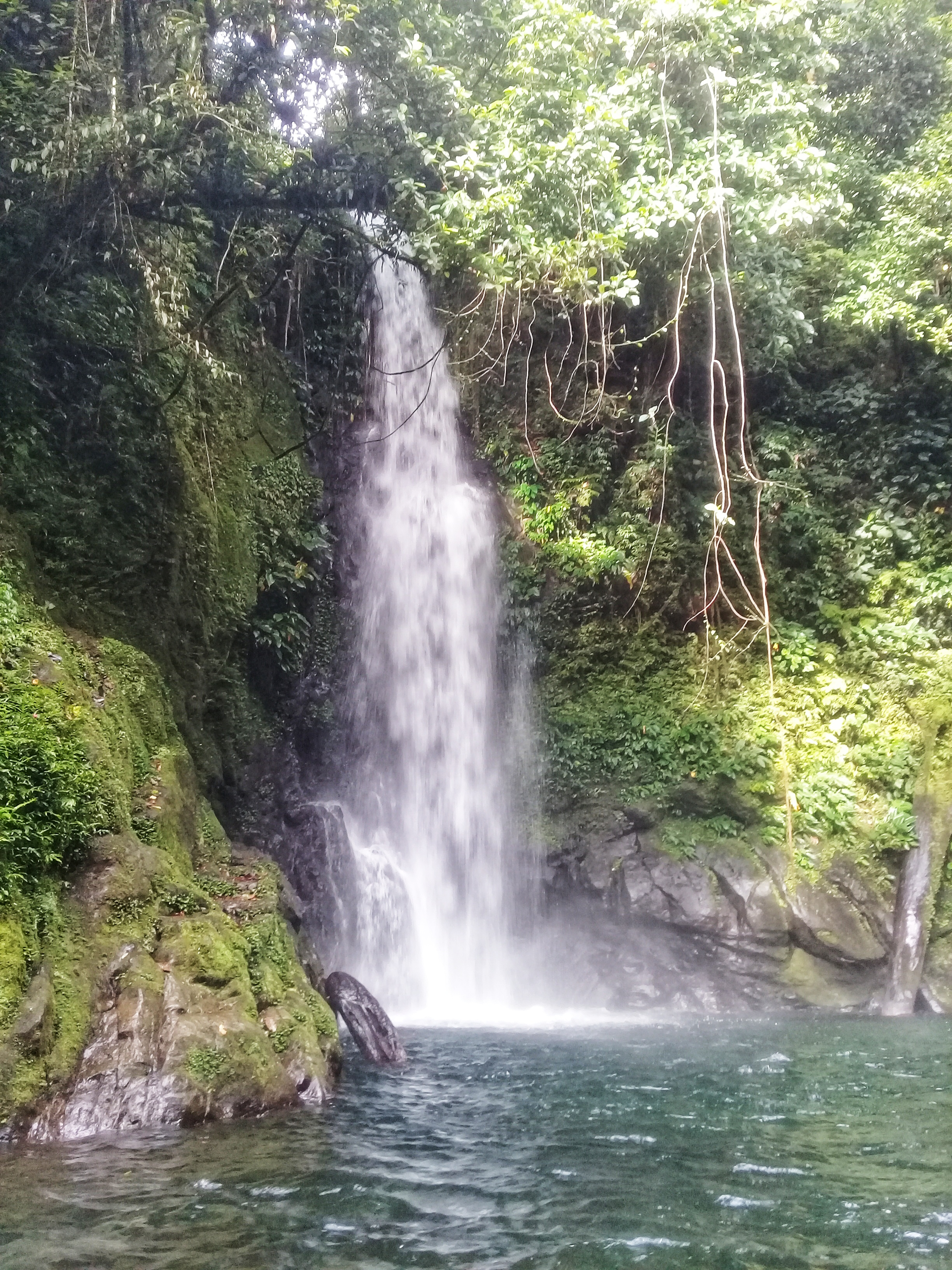
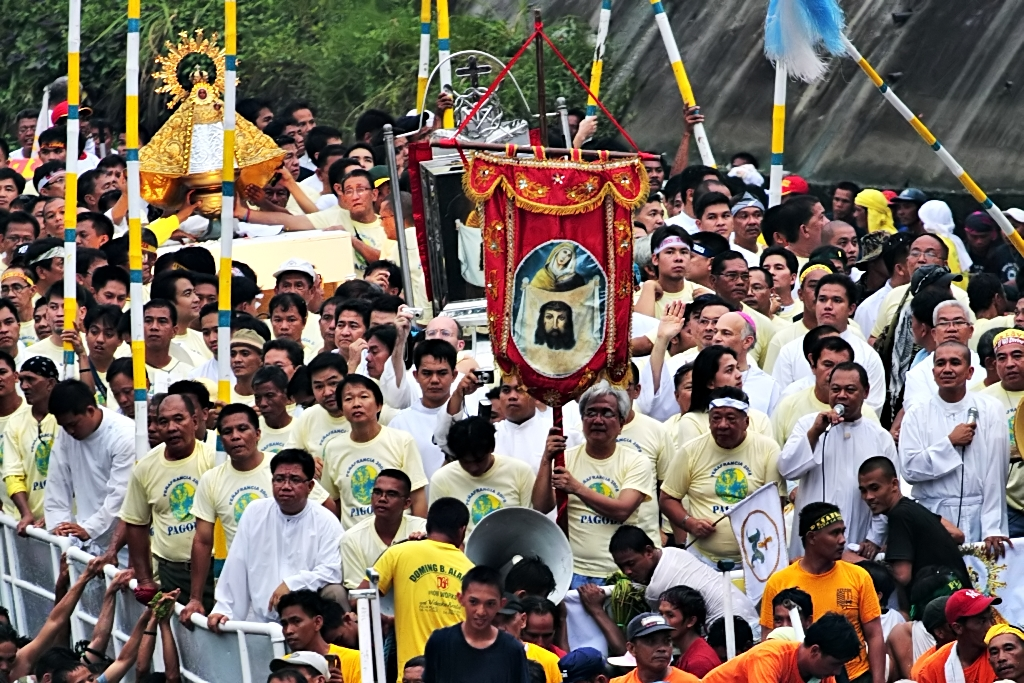
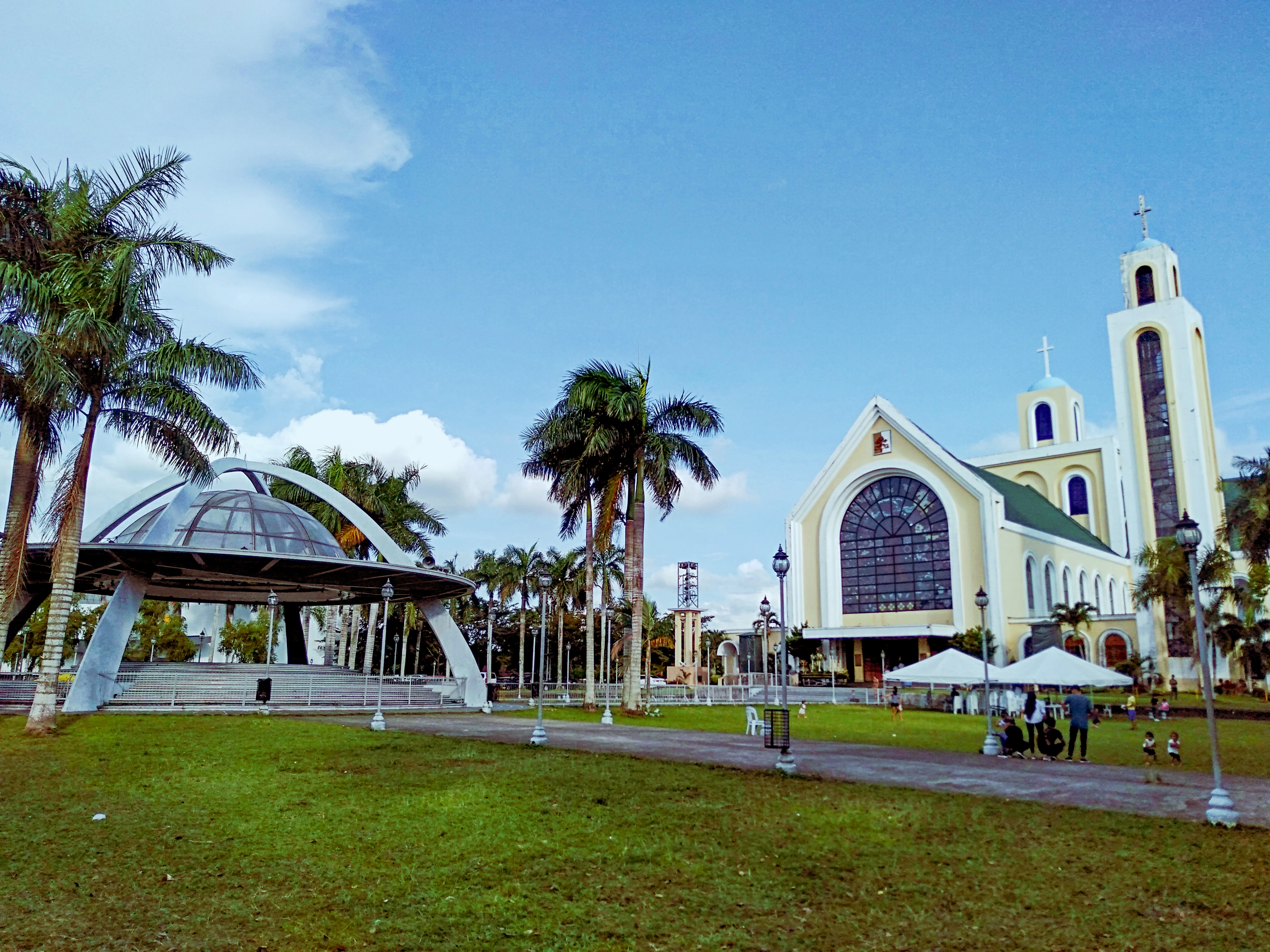
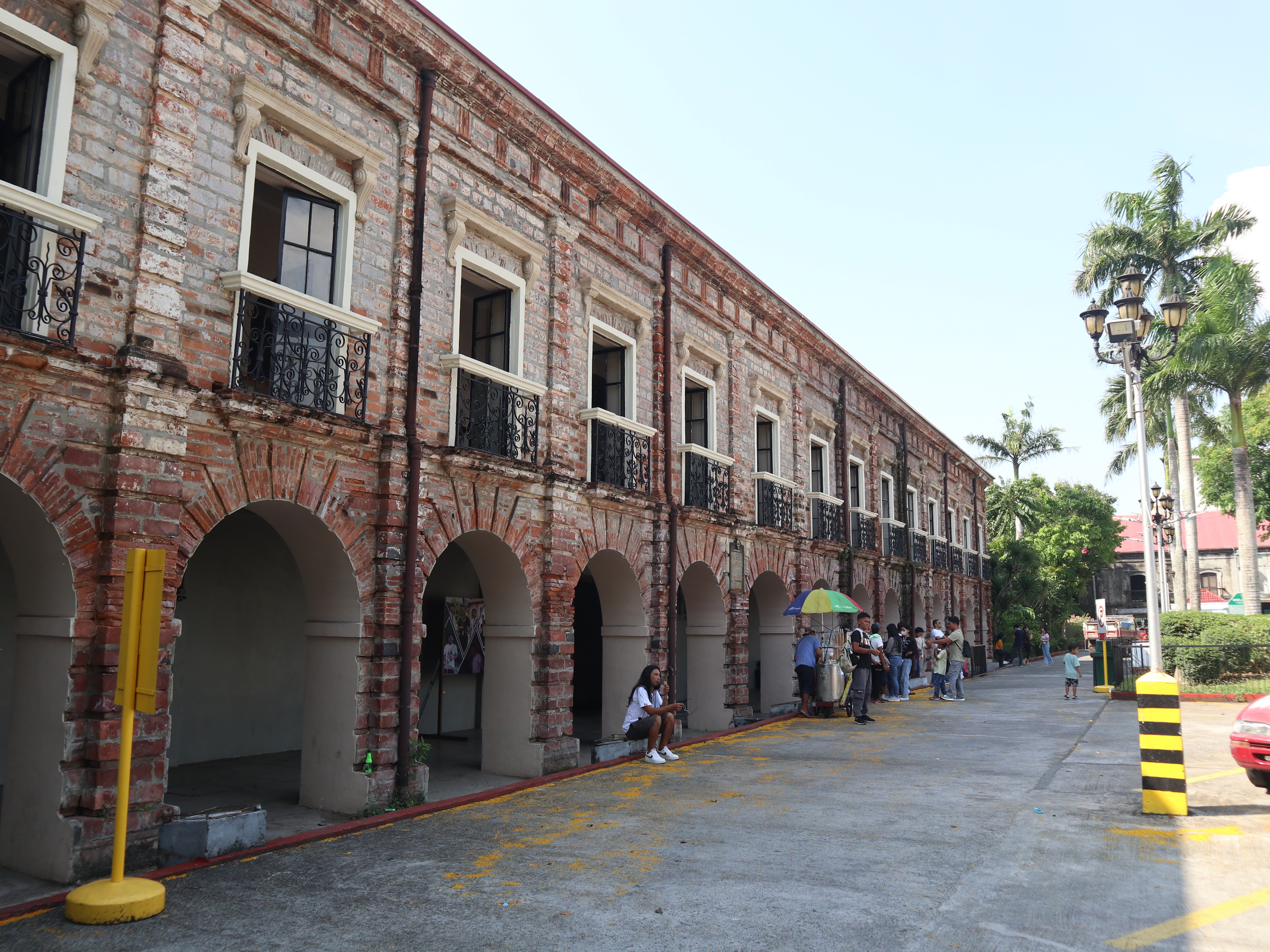
- San Francisco Church and Quince Martires Plaza Peñafrancia Shrine Our Lady of Peñafrancia Naga Metropolitan Cathedral Ateneo de Naga Naga City Hall Malabsay Falls Peñafrancia Festival Peñafrancia Basilica Minore Holy Rosary Minor Seminary

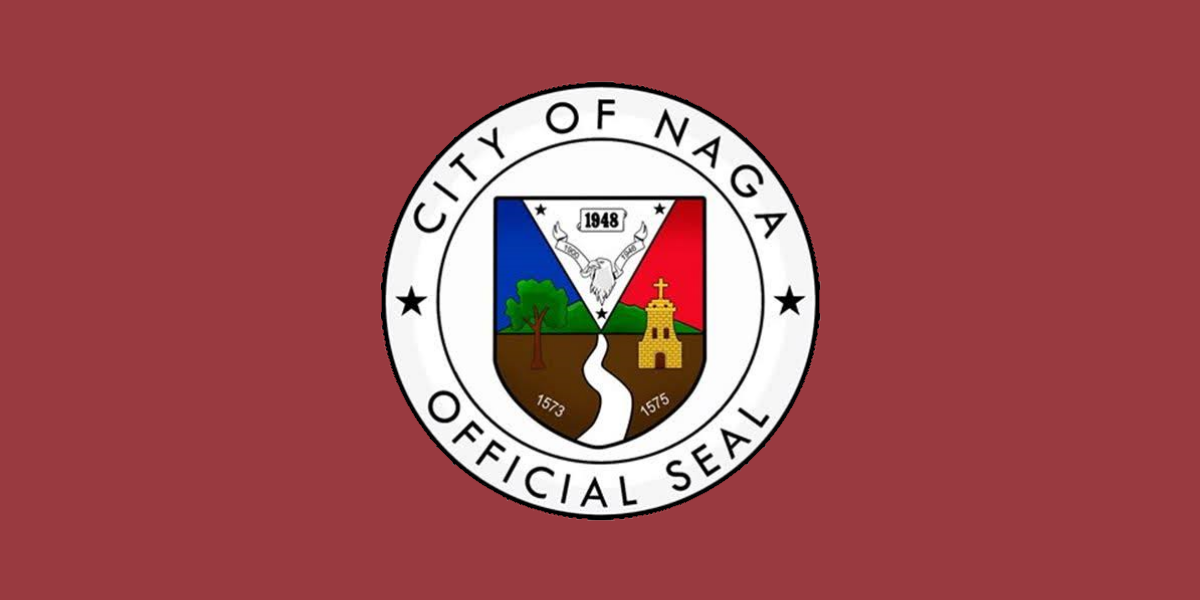
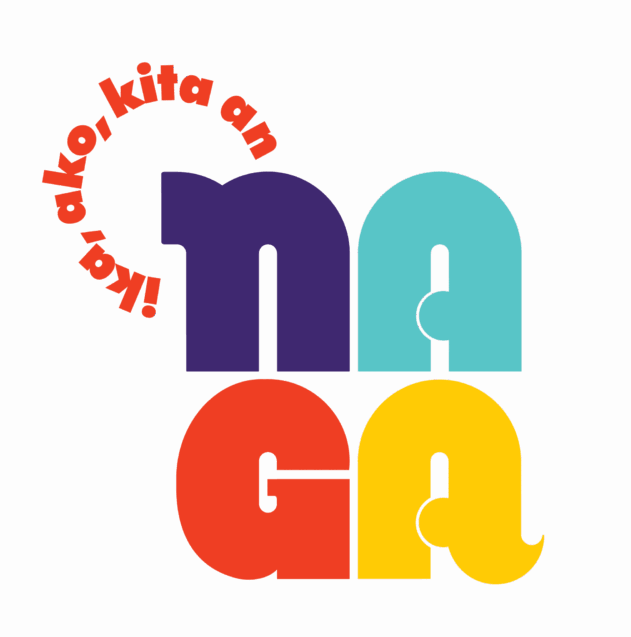
- Flag Seal Logo and wordmark
- Nicknames: Queen City of Bicol; The Heart of Bicol; An Maogmang Lugar (The Happy Place); Pilgrim City of Naga; One of the Seven Golden Cities of the Sun
- Motto: Ika, Ako, Kita an Naga (You, Me, We are Naga)
- Anthem: Heart of Bicol March
- Map of Camarines Sur with Naga highlighted
- Interactive map of Naga
- Location within the Philippines Naga (Philippines)
- Coordinates: 13°37′28″N 123°11′11″E
- Country: Philippines
- Region: Bicol Region
- Province: Camarines Sur (geographically only)
- District: 3rd district
- Founded: 1573 (Spanish settlement)
- Township: 1575 (as Nueva Caceres)
- Royal City-Charter: 1595 (as Ciudad de Nueva Caceres)
- Renamed as Naga: 1919 (as a municipality)
- Cityhood: June 18, 1948; 78 years ago
- Highly urbanized city: November 21, 2026
- Founder: Capt. Pedro de Chavez
- Barangays: 27 (see Barangays)

Government
  - Type: Sangguniang Panlungsod
  - Mayor: Leni Robredo
  - Vice Mayor: Gabriel Bordado
  - Representative: Nelson S. Legacion
  - City Council: Members: Elmer S. Baldemoro; Jessie R. Albeus; Ghiel G. Rosales; Gilda Gayle A. Gomez; Melvin Ramon G. Buenafe; Wilfredo Jude A. Diokno; Francisco M. Mendoza; Atty. Allan Reiz C. Macaraig; David Casper Nathan A. Sergio; Ma. Corazon M. Peñaflor (ex officio); Jefson Romeo B. Felix (ex officio)
  - Electorate: 121,773 voters (2025)

Area
  - Highly urbanized city: 84.48 km^{2} (32.62 sq mi)
  - Urban: 225.79 km^{2} (87.18 sq mi)
  - Metro: 1,342 km^{2} (518 sq mi)
- Elevation: 66 m (217 ft)
- Highest elevation: 1,864 m (6,115 ft)
- Lowest elevation: −1 m (−3.3 ft)

Population (2024 census)
  - Highly urbanized city: 210,545
  - Density: 2,492/km^{2} (6,455/sq mi)
  - Urban: 342,769
  - Urban density: 1,518.1/km^{2} (3,931.8/sq mi)
  - Metro: 858,414
  - Metro density: 639.7/km^{2} (1,657/sq mi)
  - Households: 50,304
- Demonym(s): Nagueño (masculine); Nagueña (feminine); Nagueñians (English, unofficial)

Economy
  - Income class: 1st city income class
  - Poverty incidence: 10.27% (2023)
  - Revenue: ₱ 1,927 million (2024)
  - Assets: ₱ 8,949 million (2024)
  - Expenditure: ₱ 1,709 million (2024)
  - Liabilities: ₱ 3,857 million (2024)
  - HDI: ▲0.767 (High)
  - GDP: $2.2 billion (2023) (₱122.361 billion)

Service provider
  - Electricity: Camarines Sur 2 Electric Cooperative (CASURECO 2)
  - Water: Metropolitan Naga Water District (MNWD)
- Time zone: UTC+8 (PST)
- ZIP code: 4400
- PSGC: 0501724000
- IDD : area code: +63 (0)54
- Native languages: Central Bikol
- Feast date: Third Saturday and Third Sunday of September
- Catholic diocese: Archdiocese of Caceres
- Patron saint: Our Lady of Peñafrancia
- Website: naga.gov.ph

Naga City, officially the City of Naga (Filipino: Lungsod ng Naga; Central Bikol: Ciudad nin Naga; Rinconada Bikol: Ciudad ka Naga) or the Pilgrim City of Naga, is a highly urbanized city in the Bicol Region of the Philippines. According to the 2024 census, it has a population of 210,545 people. It is the most populous city in Camarines Sur and the smallest city in Bicol by land area. On 26 May 2026, President Bongbong Marcos signed Proclamation No. 1267, declaring Naga a highly urbanized city. Under the Local Government Code of 1991, a plebiscite is required within 120 days to ratify the proclamation and formally convert Naga into a highly urbanized city.

The town was established in 1575 by order of Governor-General Francisco de Sande. The city, then named Nueva Cáceres (New Cáceres), was one of the Spanish royal cities in the Spanish East Indies, along with Manila, Cebu City, and Iloilo City, and is historically the third oldest.

Geographically and statistically classified, as well as legislatively represented, within Camarines Sur, but administratively and politically independent of the provincial government, Naga is considered the Bicol Region's trade, business, religious, cultural, industrial, commercial, medical, educational, and financial center.

Naga is known as the "Queen City of Bicol" due to the historical significance of Naga in the Bicol Region; as the "Heart of Bicol", due to its central geographical location on the Bicol Peninsula; and as the "Pilgrim City", in Camarines Sur since Naga is home to one of the largest Marian pilgrimages in Asia to the shrine of Our Lady of Peñafrancia, an image that is one of the country's most popular objects of devotion. Naga is described as "One of the Seven Golden Cities of the Sun" by Nick Joaquin.

== Etymology ==
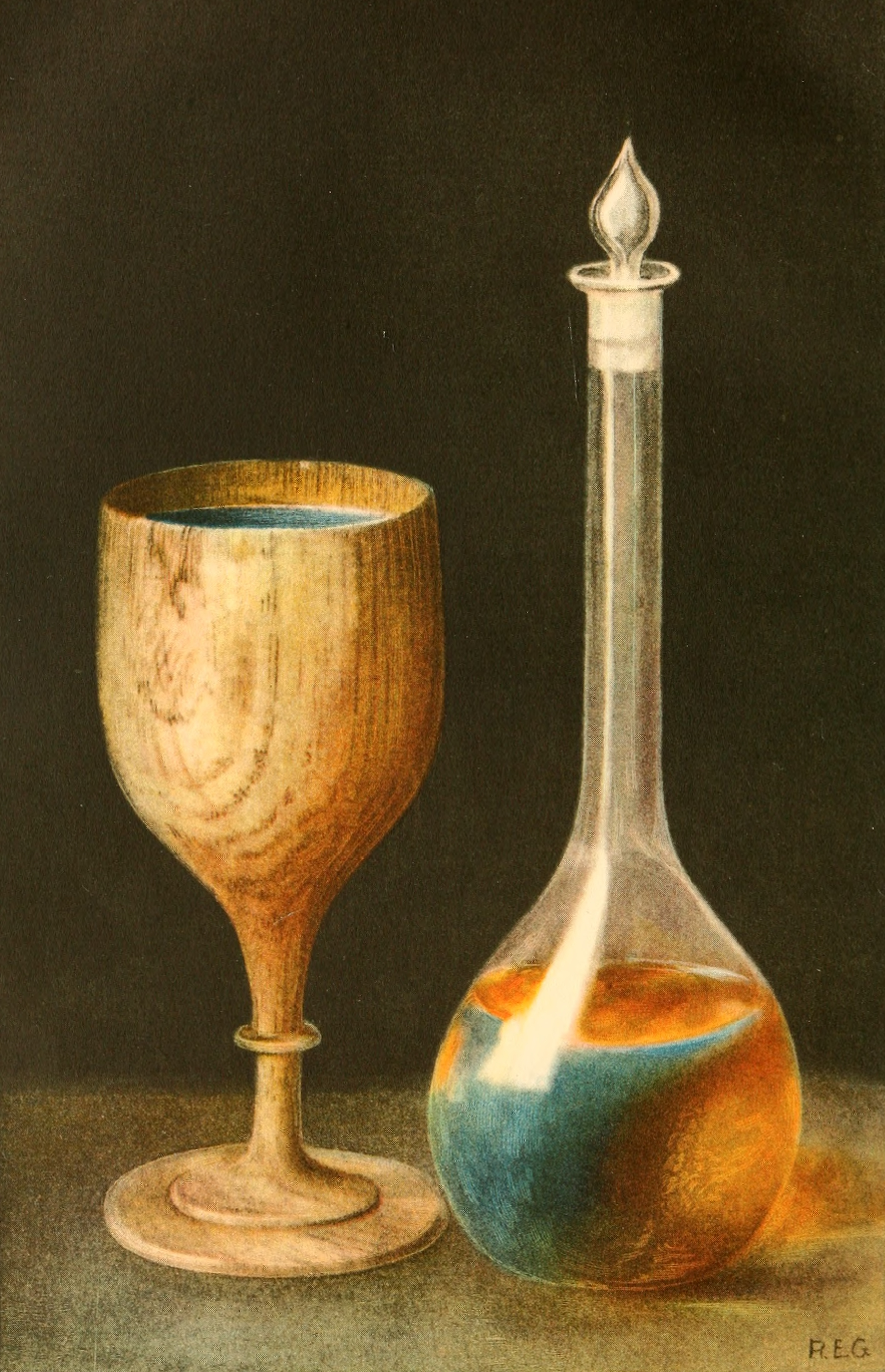
Lignum nephriticum cup made of narra wood (the namesake of the province) produced opalescent colors when water is poured into it. These wooden cups were a major pre-colonial and colonial industry of Naga.

Naga is the native pre-colonial name of the city. It is named after the narra tree (Pterocarpus indicus), which is known as naga in the Bicol language. It was abundant in the region and was part of a pre-colonial industry of wooden cups and bowls made from narra that produced distinctive blue and yellow opalescent colors when water is poured into them (later known to Europeans as lignum nephriticum). During the Spanish colonial era, they were exported to Mexico as luxury goods for their purported diuretic properties via the Manila-Acapulco Galleons, and from there, to Europe. They were often presented as gifts to European nobility.

The Jesuit missionary and historian Juan José Delgado (1697–1755) describes the industry in the following:

The city called Nueva Caceres by the Spaniards bears among the natives the name Naga, on account of the abundance of this tree throughout those provinces of Camarines and Albay, where they carve very curious cups out of it for drinking water. Those made of female naga (pale white wood) are much the better, for this wood tinges the water very quickly to a celestial color, more quickly than the male (reddish wood). These cups are much esteemed in Europe and are regarded as a gift well worthy of any prince. Out of one of these cups they made me drink when I was a child, in Cadiz (Spain), as a remedy for hydropsy and oppilation, and I think that it might have helped me had I not drunk too much.

— Juan José Delgado, Biblioteca Histórica Filipina: Historia general sacro-profana, política y natural de las islas del poniente llamadas Filipinas (1751)

== History ==
=== Precolonial era ===
==== Legendary background ====
According to the epic Maragtas, the Bicolandia was closely allied with the Kedatuan of Madja-as Confederation, which was located southeast on Panay Island. Two datus and their followers, who followed Datu Puti, arrived at Taal Lake, with one group later settling around Laguna de Bay, and another group pushing southward into the Bicol Peninsula, placing the Bicolanos between people from Luzon and people from the Visayas. An ancient tomb preserved among the Bicolanos, discovered and examined by anthropologists during the 1920s, refers to some of the same deities and personages mentioned in the Maragtas. It is however worth noting that no other material written records remain that can accurately back the epic's narrative.

==== Precolonial duluhan of Naga ====
Prior to the arrival of the first Spanish conquistadors in what is now present day Naga City, the pre-colonial settlement of Naga was a regionally hegemonic polity geographically located on a strategic tributary, now known as the Naga River, flowing from Mount Isarog to the Bicol River.

According to historians William Henry Scott and Danilo Madrid Gerona, precolonial societies were referred to by the natives as duluhan, a broader socio-political structure than the purported familiality of the natives. In Naga and in the rest of Bicol during that period, the only known tripartite social classes derived from Visayan barangays were the maguino, the richest noble class addressed as Kagoangnan ("elder" in Bikol) that were only permitted to datoship; timagua, or timawa, the commoners that constituted the general population; and the oripon ("alipin" in Tagalog), a slave class composed of other subclasses, such as the guintubo (pandoan in plural).

==== Naga river and soil ====
Naga's tributary was highly potable due to the prevalence of cascading springs from Mount Isarog, purifying the mountain's downstream. A rich ecosystem of flora and fauna sparsely inhabited within mangrove thickets were largely endemic to this district. From the igenous composition of Mount Isarog and within the vicinity of the Bicol River as the peninsular drainage basin, the soil of Naga was highly fertile, attesting to its natural wealth.

==== Territorial extent ====
The extent of the settlement of Naga was contained on the tributary's eastern bank, adjacent to a highly dependent barangay that was Tabuc, now present day barangays Tabuco and Abella; the name derived from the Bikol word "taboc", a "cockfighting blade", due to the landform's resemblance. The Naga settlement is now roughly within the area where the present-day barangays of Lerma and Tinago are located.

Tabuco was highly instrumental in the development of Naga, simultaneously with the other vassal barangays in the riverine district paying tribute to Naga in gold and rice. Coupled with the tributary's choke point, these effectively made Naga a highly influential village in domestic inter-barangic politics.

===== Regional trade hegemony =====
The settlement of Naga, attributed to its strategic location, was a major trading outpost, controlling traffic between the gold mining barangays of Paracale and Mambulao (now Jose Panganiban) and the rice cultivating district of Yraya, where pre-Hispanic Bato and Libon were located. The settlement's prowess in trading, not limited to domestic ties but to inter-maritime affairs, acquired Naga a comparatively advanced armament consisting of "iron corslets, greaves, wristlets, gauntlets, helmets, arquebuses, and culverins" from foreign Asian traders, evidently Chinese traders of the Ming dynasty from the Silk Road.

===== Economic affluence =====
The fertile soil in Naga reflected the "export-scale" rice and abaca production, also harboring an abundance of hardwoods such as narra, yakal (Shorea astylosa), guijo (Shorea guiso), kamagong (Diospyros blancoi), and molave (Vitex parviflora). Popular regional livelihoods in the Naga district also included fishing, accompanied by the Bicol River's biodiversity of fish, mollusks, and crustaceans. Additionally, Naga once led a major regional metal industry that the Spanish came to soon propose of further territorial ambitions into the purported opulence of Los Camarines.

=== Spanish colonial period ===
==== Early discovery of Naga (1573–1579) ====
===== Salcedo's expedition =====
In July 1573, Governor-General Guido de Lavezaris ordered the first Spanish expedition into Southern Luzon. Led by conquistador Juan de Salcedo, they eventually landed in the settlement of Naga. Augustinian chronicler Fray Gaspar de San Agustin, detailed the number of the barangay's native buildings to be 3,000, beyond Libon's 800. Disputedly, as San Agustin infamously inflated statistics beyond proportion, it was indicated in his report that "in the river of Vicol and Camarines which capital was the village of Naga and had one hundred thousand armed men excluding laborers and merchants."

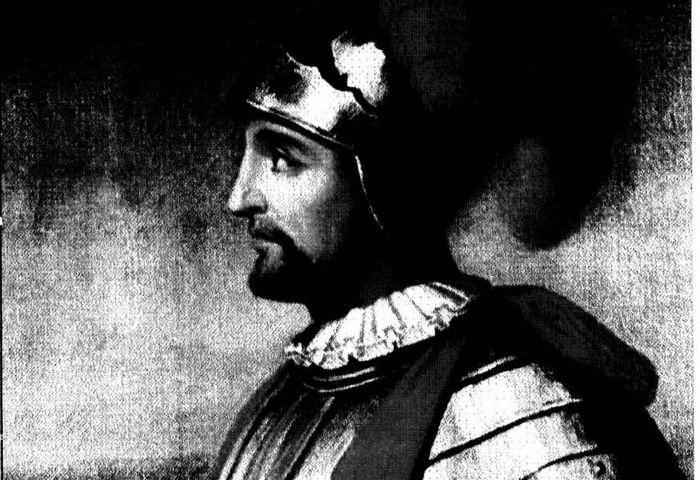
Juan de Salcedo (1549–1576) was a Spanish conquistador who led the first voyage into the Bicol peninsula. He was the grandson of famed conquistador Miguel López de Legazpi.

Reporting Naga's craftsmanship in metallurgy and affluence from maritime trading afforded the establishment of a garrison and Bicol's first Catholic mission base, now the San Francisco Parish Church, formerly made of wood and hay; on the western bank of Naga's river. Three months after Salcedo's return to Manila with his 800 taels (400 grams) of gold, his garrison stationed in Naga hoarded a total of 2,800 taels (140 kilograms) of gold from the riverine district.

===== Conquest of the Naga settlement =====
In 1574, Doctor Francisco de Sande, in continuation of the archipelagic colonization, executed the military campaign to conquer the newly discovered polities in Southern Luzon. This military contingent was led by Salcedo's most prominent commanders: Captain Pedro de Chavez, Alferez Cristobal de Saldaña, Francisco Saavedra, and Esteban de Solis. Armed with hundreds of soldiers and native allied warriors, the overall contingent departed Manila southbound and initially engaged with the hostile villages of Mambulao and Paracale, then, upon further incursions down south, Baao, Bula, and Naga.

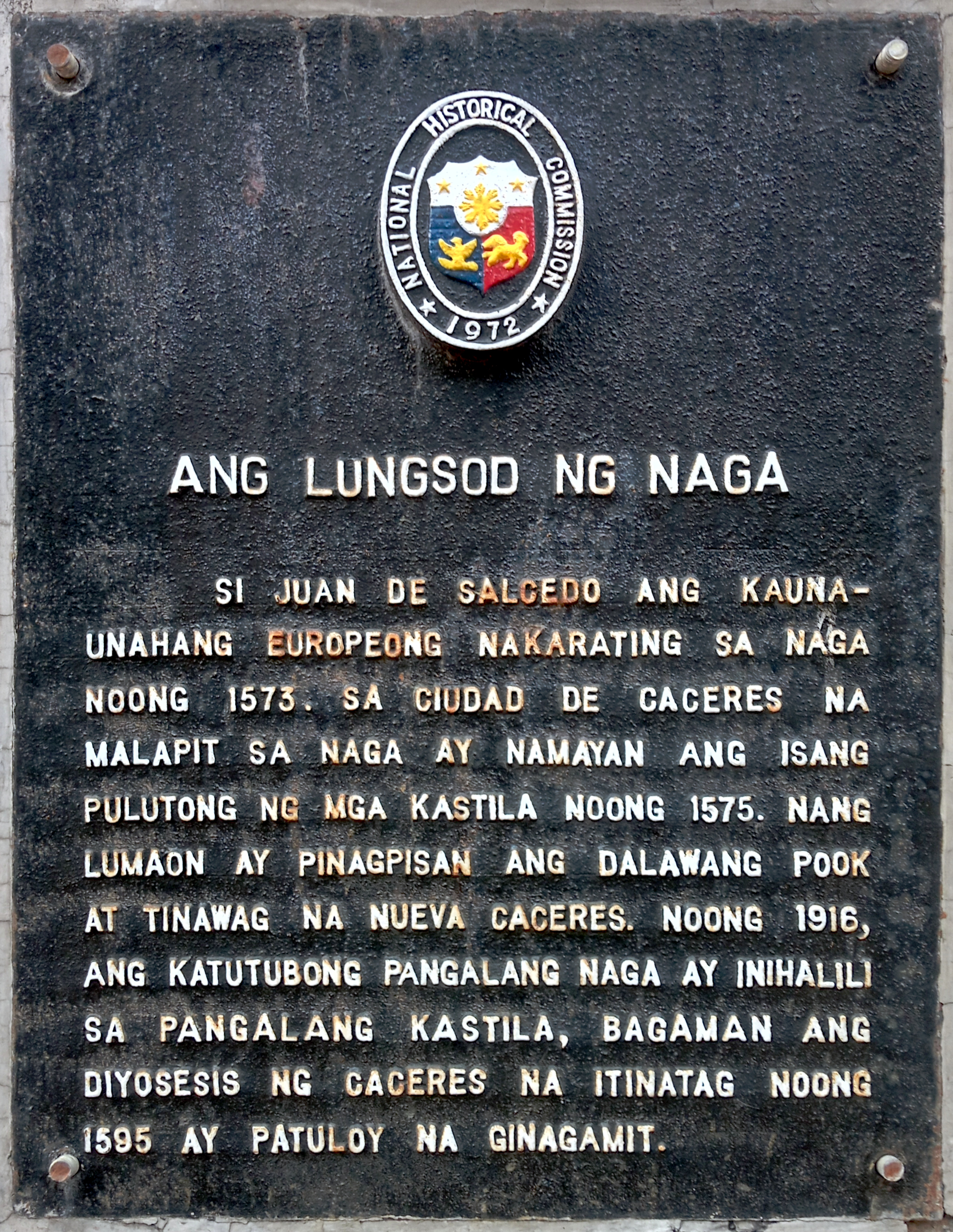
Oragon Monument (Historical Marker)

In Naga, the armed residents waged a fierce defensive battle on the settlement's river banks against the Spanish forces. Ultimately, despite the stubborn resistance, the natives succumbed to the Spanish; throughout the ordeal, the locals suffered substantial casualties. Upholding the warriors of the conquered barangay in profound esteem, Augustinian chronicler Fray Martin de Rada once said,

"The people there are the most valiant and best armed men of all these islands. Consequently, although they never attacked the Spaniards, they defended themselves in all their villages, and would not surrender unless conquered by force of arms. Consequently, all those villages were entered in the same way, by first summoning them to submit peacefully, and to pay tribute immediately unless they wished war. They replied that they would first prove those to whom they were to pay tribute, and consequently, the Spaniards attacking them, an entrance was made among them by force of arms, and the village was overthrown and whatever was found pillaged."

— Fray Martin de Rada to Viceroy Martin Enriquez, pp. 286-288

In 1575, Captain Pedro de Chávez, the commander of the garrison left behind by Salcedo, founded on garrison grounds a temporary settlement. He christened the settlement after incumbent Gov.-Gen. Sande's hometown of Cáceres, Spain.

===== Naga encomenderos in service of the Crown =====
The Spanish administrative capital settled in Libon was transferred to the area of Naga due to its centrally strategic location administering the other newly erected encomiendas, rapidly populating the riverine district. By 1578, Christianization efforts were first spearheaded in the Camarines region by Franciscans Pablo de Jesus and Bartolome Ruiz in collaboration with the encomiendas through the system of reducción, embodied in the voluminious compendium of the Recopilacion de Leyes de los Reinos de las Indias (Laws of the Indies) urging for:

"the natives for their own advantage and comfort should live together in the pueblos, and not scattered around the hills and mountains, deprived of all material and spiritual benefits of the minister and of the natural interaction by law of nature, among men."

— Recopilación de Leyes de las Indias

During the period of protracted pacification, the encomienda system was officially ratified in the region, supplanting the inter-barangic and hegemonic administrative order with Imperial rule.

The first wards incorporated in the encomienda system were Naga and Camaligan, assigned to encomendero Pedro Cid. The Crown appropriated the conquered lands to the highly decorated Spanish soldiers who participated in the incursions, enjoining them to a "threefold responsibility" of "(1) to maintain peace among the natives within the encomienda, (2) to support the missionaries, (3) to protect and defend the natives from any hostile elements."

In return, the encomenderos were formally authorized to exact a tribute of eight reales annually upon their male subjects, ranging from ages of nineteen to sixty. The former polities' chieftains had to regularly collect tributes from his residents, then forward the currency or commodity to the encomendero in charge, who typically resided in the administrative capital. A quarter of a ward's tribute was made taxable to royal coffers, simultaneously funding the clergy.

==== Establishment of the Villa de Nueva Cáceres (1579) ====
===== Founding of Villa de Cáceres =====
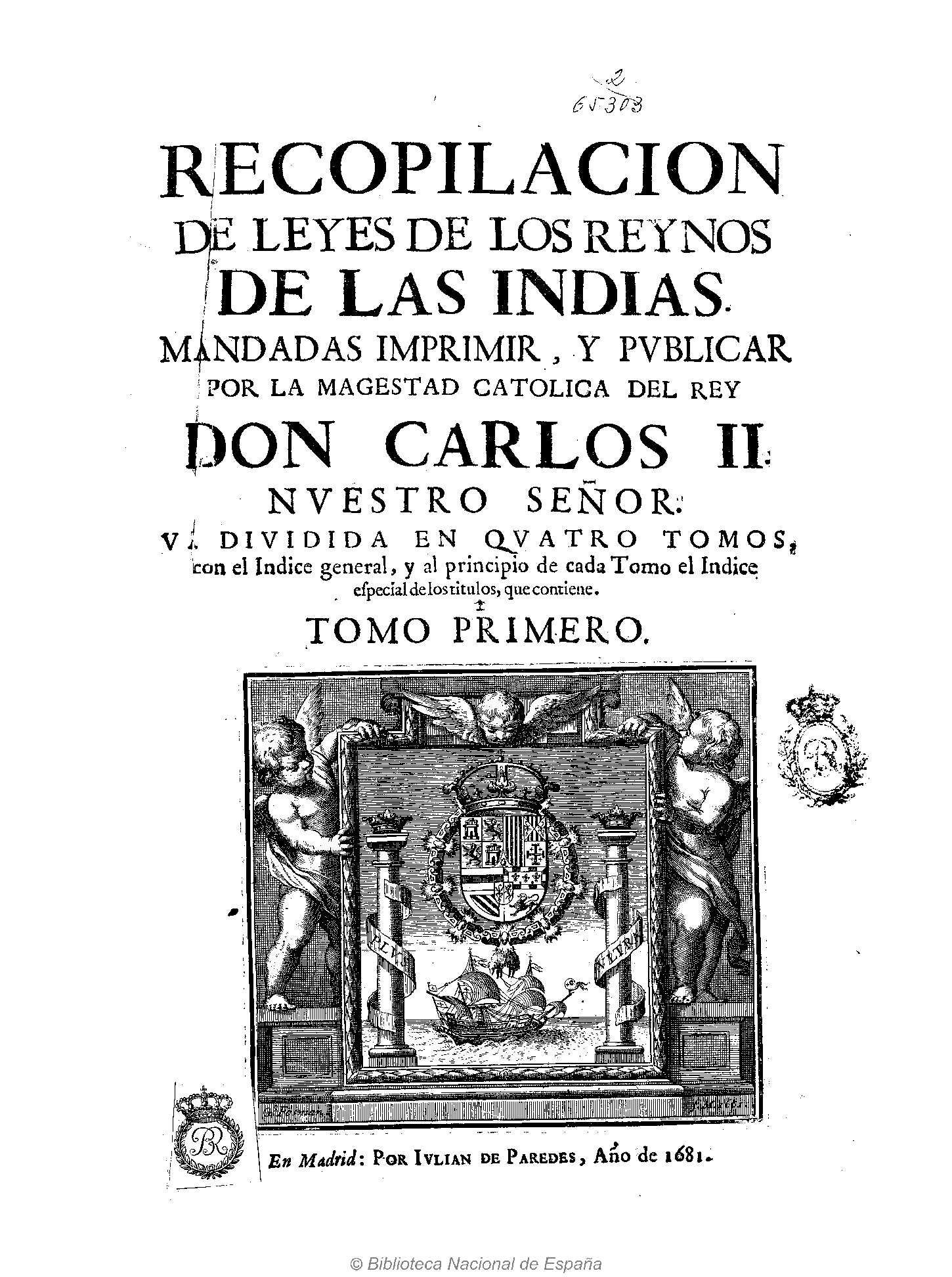
A facsimile cover of the Recopilacion de Leyes de los Reynos de las Indias, in its 1681 edition however.

The centralized bureaucracy of the Spanish dealt a crucial role in its urban planning thereafter, which in turn, influenced the establishment of Nueva Caceres. Imperial legislation, prescribed primarily by the Laws of the Indies, tailored the preferable urban settlement to a cosmopolitan congregation of self-sustainable industries, a natural bottle neck of commerce, and the strategic base of both ecclesiastical and military operations.

On 27 May 1579, Capt. Juan Arce de Sadornil, the garrison commander in Naga, received instructions from the Imperial administration in Manila pertaining to the appropriate selection of a Spanish settlement in Bicol. Capt. Sadornil coordinated with the Franciscan missionaries at the San Francisco de Naga convent to chart their settlement's expanse to observe the logistical, strategical, and technical feasibility of a formal settlement's construction.

Sometime in 1579, the departure of the two pioneering missionaries brought about Fray Geronimo Aguilar, who sat at the San Francisco de Naga convent from 1579 until 1586. He was the first missionary to teach the natives Iberian music such as Spanish cantos, including Western notation such as tonic sol-fas that made their way toward the 1700s in Camarines parishes. Cáceres, which were mostly wired to missionary operations, had gained the St. John the Evangelist parish church (now the Naga Metropolitan Cathedral) upon Philip II's royal order to construct an explicitly secular parish attending the ecclesiastical needs of the Spanish community of Nueva Cáceres (a division of labor between those of religious orders serving as missionaries and secular priests serving to Cáceres residents only). Its first curate, founded in 1579 as evinced by a report he wrote in Nueva España dated 10 May 1580, was Bachiller Balthasar de Miranda.

The parish priest was allotted stipends of fifty thousand maravedis directly from the royal treasury, converting the balance to three hundred pesos, parallel to the alcalde mayor's which were shouldered by the residents of Nueva Cáceres.

Composed of a couple hundred Spanish colonists at this point, on 16 September 1579, Gov.-Gen. Sande acquired royal recognition decreeing the appellation of "villa" onto the newly dubbed settlement of Cáceres. In subsequent documents within the Manila bureaucracy, "nueva," Spanish for "new," was prefixed to "Cáceres," thus "Nueva Cáceres," to distinguish the locality from its namesake in Spain.

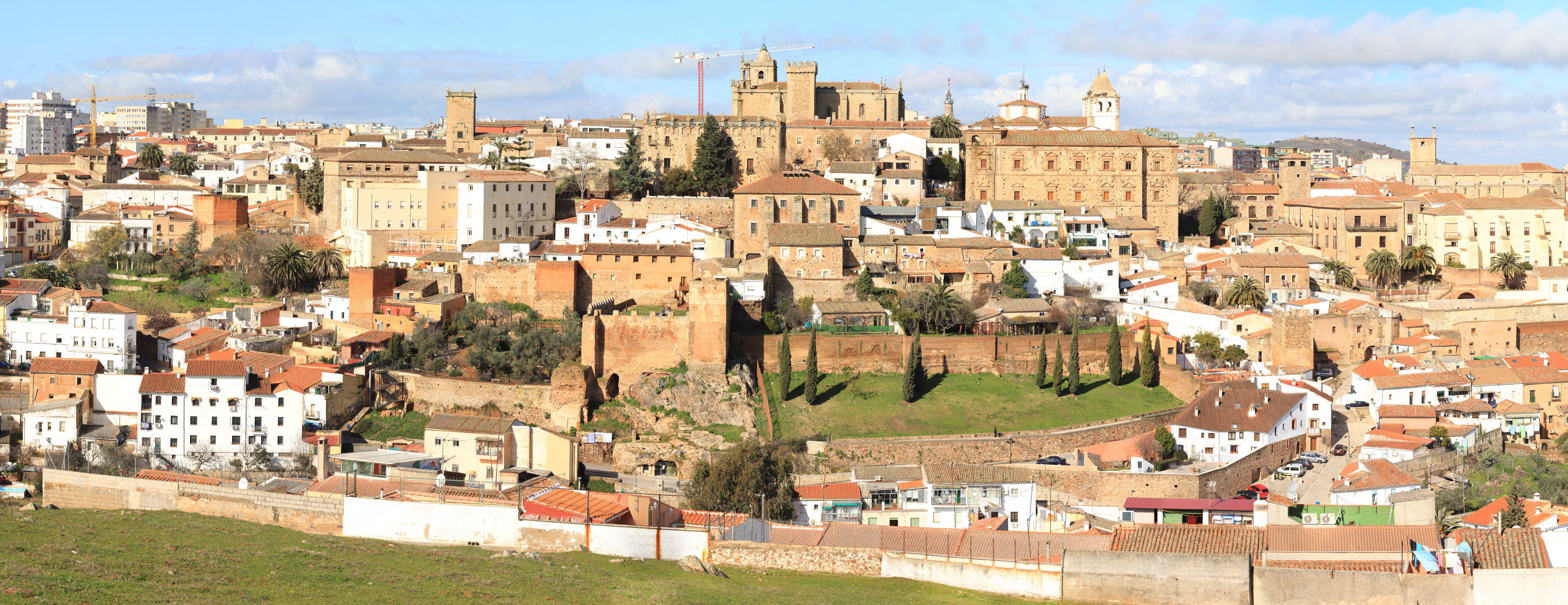
A panoramic view of Gov.-Gen. Francisco de Sande's hometown, Cáceres.

The prerequisites of being elevated to villa, historically subject by Nueva Cáceres, were the settlement had to have at least a semblance of preliminary urbanization sheltered by a strategic military base with aims for further conquest. The Villa de Cáceres had about 24 encomenderos taking quarters in it by 1581 according to a report from Capt. Miguel de Loarca.

===== Administrative bureaucracy of the locality =====
From 1580 to 1581, the burgeoning Spanish community in Nueva Cáceres laid the framework for the earliest city-styled local governance in Southern Luzon. Inspired by Latin American municipal bureaucracies, the alcaldia (the province) Nueva Cáceres had an alcalde mayor with a salary of three hundred pesos, serving as its Capitan de Guerra (military commander); counciled by a lower echelon of public officials referred to as the cabildo (municipal council), which consisted of 2 alcaldes-in-ordinary and 6 regidores, the council of elderlies, appointed by the governor-general.

The alcaldia's (referring to the pacified province) jurisdiction in 1581 extended from Camarines toward Catanduanes, instilling the regidores to "elect" (although it was represented as democratic, elections were merely an elitist selection of whom the governor-general could appoint) among the general populace of the vecino (colonists), mayors, and the alguaciles (constables).

==== Elevation of Nueva Cáceres to cuidad status (1586) ====
===== Rapid Christianization of the indigenous =====
On 8 September 1585, Gov.-Gen. Santiago de Vera ordered the municipal government, in collaboration with Fray Juan de Garrovillas of the San Francisco convent, to

"inspect the poblaciones to be built, the size and form of the churches, you must also consider the work to be carried out by the natives where these poblaciones and churches will be established."

— Gov.-Gen. Santiago de Vera

This eventually culminated to a decree in 1594 formally authorizing the Franciscans at the helm of the San Francisco church to take over all ecclesiastical operations in all of the region.

By the start of 1586, the Franciscans from the San Francisco convent established a nipa-and-wood infirmary dubbed the Hospital de San Diego, referred to more popularly as the Hospital de San Lazaro. This was also granted upon royal degree by Philip II of Spain.

===== Request to the King =====
In 1586, recognizing the cruciality of the cuidad (city) status, a formal letter was sent to Philip II, thereby requesting the King:

"...(a) to confirm the present status of Caceres as a city created by virtue of the governor-general's will and authority; (b) to allocate a propio of about 1,000 men or more to the city; (c) to preserve the present set-up of the city government; (d) to confirm and honor the appointments to the various offices."

— Memorial de lo que se ha pedir a su Magestad haga merced a la cuidad de Caceres en la provincia de Bicor y Camarines en las isla de Luzon, en estas islas del poniente

In this document, the Spanish officials mentioned were Luis Briceño, alguacil mayor; and Juan de Guzman and Sebastian Garcia, regidores. Augmenting the elevation of a ciudad meant a propio (native settlement providing basic goods to the city) was required to supplement such substantial urbanization of Nueva Cáceres, ultimately to the expense of the natives in the alcaldia. The rapid gentrification of Nueva Cáceres prompted the assignment of the "component villages" Naga and Tabuc to propio's bidding.

By 1588, the population of Nueva Cáceres were numbering the hundreds upon upholding of city status. On the same year, the Calle Real building had finished construction, serving as the alcalde-mayor's residence. The incipient city consisted of 30 citizens, 20 of whom married (some settling after Capt. Juan Maldonado's expedition in 1585) and 6 among them married to native women; 30 soldiers; "a church with a vicar, a Franciscan Monastery with two priests and two brothers besides and one alcalde mayor." Encouragement from authorities to interbreed with the native population was decisively a means to maintain the growth of the city, "even blurring the racial gap."

Up toward the 1590s, the honorifics of villa and cuidad were often used interchangeably, denoting the blurred distinctions of the locality among its vast residencies, especially among clerical spheres in contrast to the newfound municipal bureaucracy.

==== Establishment of the See of Cáceres (1595) ====
By the 17th century, almost most of the propios under the Spaniards had been completely converted to Catholicism, abandoning their animistic heritage altogether.

"Nueva Cáceres" was identified in the papal bull of Pope Clement VIII on 14 August 1595, which established the see of Cáceres, together with Cebú and Nueva Segovia, and made it the seat of the new bishopric subject to the Archdiocese of Manila. The Diocese's first bishop, Luis Maldonado, O.F.M., died before his assumption, his successor was Francisco Ortega, O.S.A..

Nueva Cáceres was settled by around 100 Spaniards from Europe, reinforced by migrations from Mexico during Capt. Maldonado's expedition. From a report by Don Antonio Morga of the Oidor of the Royal Audencia, he characterized the urban life of Nueva Cáceres as:

"...well populated since the time of Doctor Sande, Governor of the Philippine Islands. It has approximately one hundred Spaniards, with its city corporations and mayors, aldermen, and officials."

— Don Antonio Morga's report of the Oidor of the Royal Audiencia

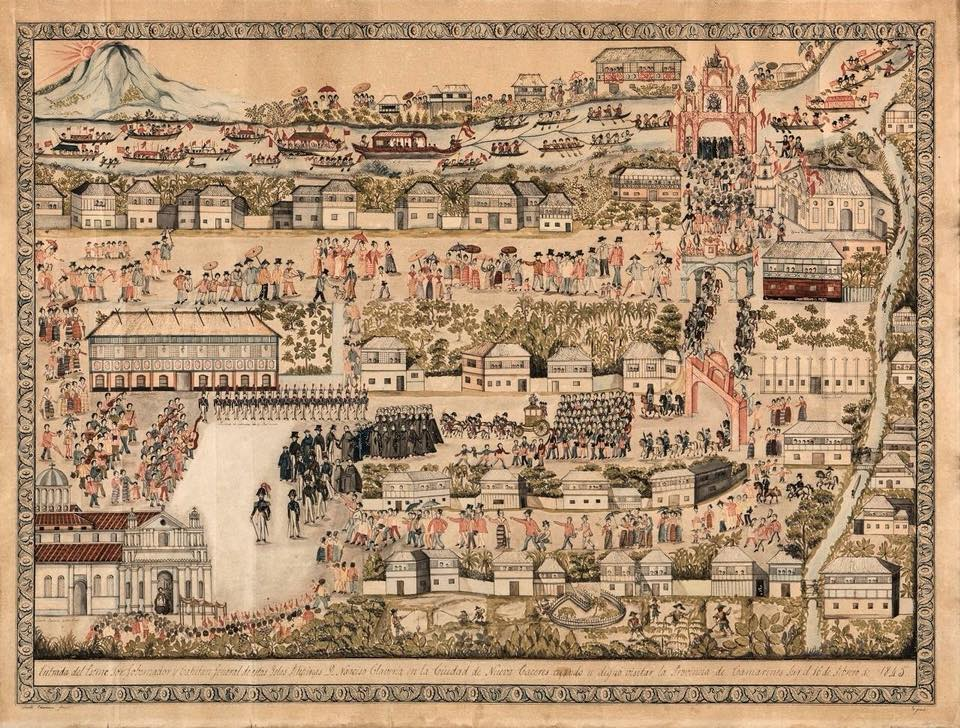
Visit of Gov.-Gen Narciso Claveria y Zaldua at Nueva Caceres on Feb 16, 1845. Painting by Honorato Lozano

==== Ciudad de Nueva Cáceres in the 17th century ====
===== Bishrophic vacuum and widespread poverty =====
At the beginning of the 17th century, there were only five other ciudades in the Philippines. Despite this, the city was plagued by a bureaucratic clergy. A bishrophic vacuum brought about by the diocese's short-lived episcopasies, an insufficient taxation system, the constancy of hostile Dutch naval incursions, led by two ships from Van Noort's fleet of Lambert Vleisman starting in 1600; and Moro raids resulted in a demented civic development of Nueva Cáceres.

One of the causes of poverty was the inadequent population, both indio and Spaniard, to sufficiently fund Nueva Cáceres' public systems. Coupled with this is the dependence of Hispanic Naga on the now defunct regional trade among duluhans in the Vicor riverine district.

Baltazar de Cobarrubias y Múñoz, O.S.A., was officially appointed as successor, taking on the diocese in 1603, but ultimately losing it in 1605. The following, Pedro de Godinez, O.F.M., was among one of those who died before seating the diocese; he was however the only one with a preliminary plan such as a document revealed in Seville to construct a concrete cathedral upon immediate arrival.

The first to be elected among the ensemble of the former missionaries of the Diocese of Cáceres was Pedro Matía, O.F.M., serving from 1612 then perishing a year later. Diego Guevara, O.S.A. followed in 1617 until 1621, then Luis de Cañizares, O.M. dying before being seated in the diocese in 1624. In 1628, Cañizares' successor, Francisco de Zamudio y Avendaño, O.S.A., breathed new hope to the city's ecclesiastical sphere, not succumbing as immediately as many before had. His administration also saw the first Moro raid upon Nueva Cáceres in October 1636, where famed Franciscan friar Fray Cervera fought and died in the defense of the San Francisco convent.Despite this, Zamudio's episcopate was marred with controversies, ultimately passing in 1639. Nicolás de Zaldívar y Zapata, O.S.A. arrived in 1642, then died in 1646.

In 1653, Antonio de San Gregorio, O.F.M. was the first to serve the post five years onward, dying only eight years later in 1661. Abhorring the squalor of the city, San Gregorio provided a comment through a letter requesting royal assistance, stating:

"there is in the city of Nueba Cazeres the following: the cathedral, which is a small chapel of bamboo without bells nor ornaments, burned down by the Dutch enemy years before. After the cathedral is the house of the alcalde mayor, made of good bricks and lime; there are also the houses of the escribano and the alguacil mayor which are of bamboo. Following this is a structure which they call the hospital, also of bamboo and the last is the convent of San Francisco, a very massive structure of lime and bricks."

San Gregorio also proposed to Philip IV the complete rehaul of the cathedral edifice, which was considered largely decrepit and neglected. On 20 March 1660, the king officially decreed its renovation, but by this point, San Gregorio had already passed a year later, not living to see the completion of the cathedral.

Succeeding San Gregorio was Andrés González, O.P., the longest of which ruled the See of Cáceres. Assuming the episcopate in 1661, González ordered further repairs in the cathedral. This backfired however, resulting in a fissured wall "made worse by the earthquakes." In February 1691, a letter co-written by residents Lorenzo Duran Rivera, Jeronimo Silvestre de Grimaldo, Baltasar de Tamayo y Tobar, Luis Jimenez de Rivera y Flores, Juan de la Ostia Coronado and Juan de Aguilera Verastigui was sent to Carlos II, King of Spain, to transfer the cityhood of Nueva Cáceres with all of its statutes and grants to Paracale due to the city's immense strife; this did not materialize. After González, Domingo de Valencia seated the diocese in 1718, dying a year later. His successor was Felipe de Molina, now appalled at the backward state of Naga. Molina also pointed out the rundown condition of the house of priests turned bishop's residence through his comment, "that there was no place for him to live in."

===== Attempts to resolve Nueva Cáceres' economic malaise =====
In the mid-17th century, attempts toward economic self-sufficiency were made by both residents and of the civil government. On 16 July 1664, Gov.-Gen. Diego Salcedo reported an iron deposit in Mambulao, having sent Capt. Gil Carol to assess the mines. Despite having sent 553 arroba (7,830 kilograms) of iron to the Almacenes Reales (Royal Warehouses) during this period, no serious industrialization became of the mine due to the crude native metallurgy utilized.

===== Galleon trade in the 17th century =====
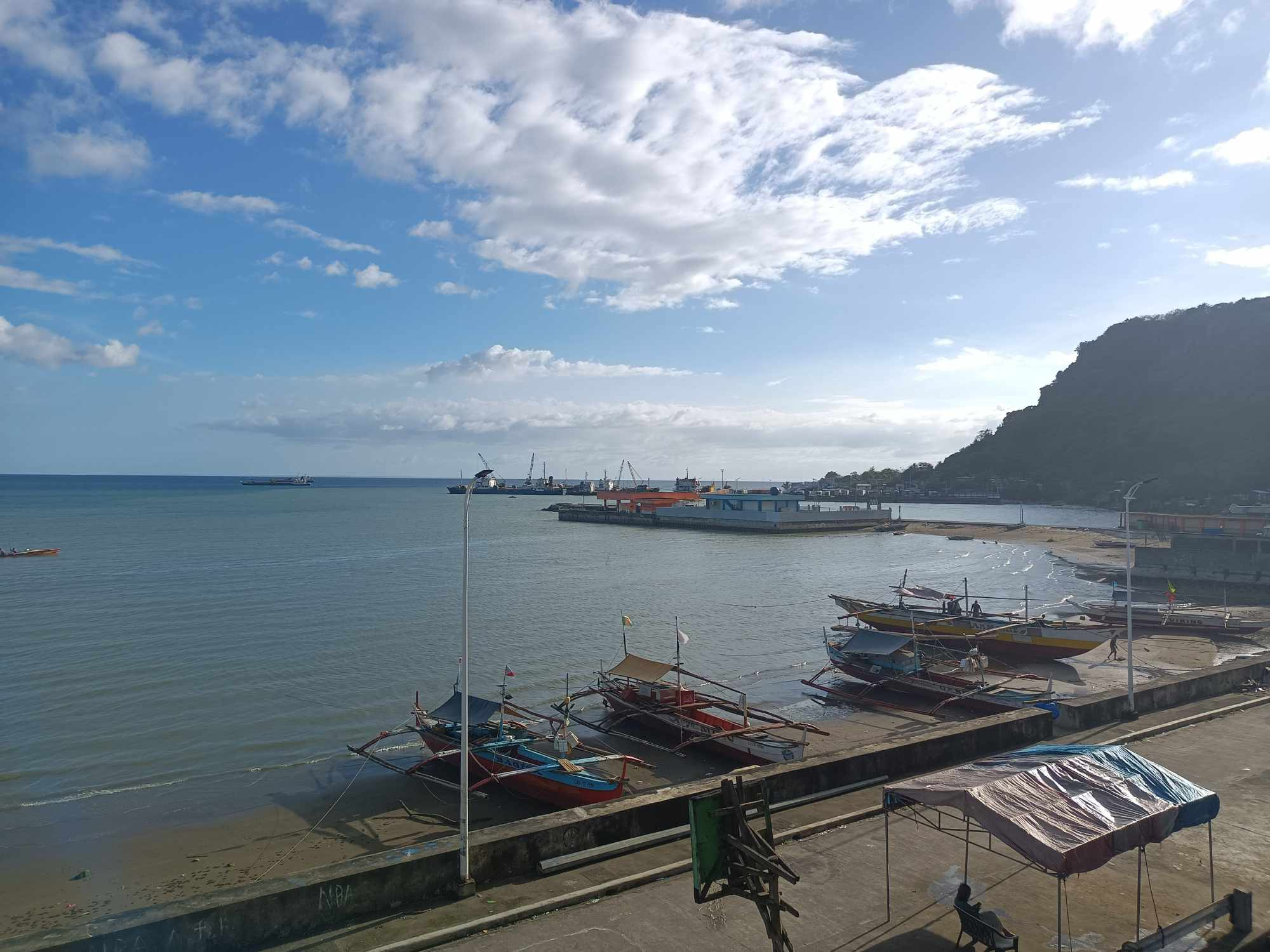
A present-day view of Pasacao Port c. 2025

The Manila galleon between Manila and Acapulco of the late 17th century directly attributed to the economic propensity of Bicol and consequently its regional capital, Nueva Cáceres. Without a port in Camarines, many ports were opened on its southern coast in the 17th century, such as Cabusao and the province's main seaport of Pasacao. Prominent tradelines were also established in the barrios of Caramoan and Quipayo. The access Nueva Cáceres had to these trading hubs, Pasacao in particular, propelled the domestic abaca trade to an export-scale industry. Pasacao had a shipyard where galleons were built such as the Angel de la Guardia in 1613 and the Nuestra Señora de Guadalupe in 1703. Pasacao's importance to the globalist trade in Nueva Cáceres aiding this network, as described by Capt. Miguel de Loarca in his report:

"Farther along the coast near Pasacao River begin the provinces of Vicor and Camarines, which, as we have said above, are situated on the east side as you enter the Philippine islands. Disembarking at the Pasacao River, which is seventy leagues from the city of Manila by sea, and journeying three leagues by land, one comes to the Vicor River flowing north; its source is in the opposite coasts of the islands."

— Capt. Miguel Loarca, Relaccion de las Islas de Filipinas, 1582

Due to the preeminent relation that Nueva Cáceres held over the dominion of Pasacao, propositions were conferred by Gov.-Gen. Juan Niño de Tavora of the construction of a canal from Pasacao connecting to the Naga river to allow smaller vessels into its quay without disembarking in Pasacao. Attested by Fray Antonio de San Gregorio on 13 July 1656 to the King, he wrote in his report:

"Gov.-Gen. Tavora ordered the opening of a creek running close to the port of Pasacao to link this river from Naga so that the commodities needed by his Majesty could be easily brought to the port and that Indians may bring theirs."

These plans however were ultimately scrapped due to the project's logistical complexities.

==== New developments and demographics ====
Throughout the 17th century, despite the languishing state of the city, many civic, religious, and infrastructural developments were made during this period. One such example was the evolution of the Hospital de San Diego: in 1623, the building was replaced by a lime and stone structure renamed Hospital Real de Cáceres (Royal Hospital of Cáceres) on a ranch in the village of Sorral (present-day stretch of Peñafrancia from Colgante Bridge to San Francisco Church) donated on 13 September 1625 by a Spanish couple. A Dutch raid in 1648 reduced the infirmary to bamboo, which was subsequently rebuilt as a sturdier structure in 1650. In 1663, the structure endured damages from a typhoon. Despite the high-maintenance of the hospital, it was preserved administration after administration until 1691 where it was ultimately closed by lay supervisors for the reason thereof.

Aside from infrastructural growth, the native populations of Naga and Tabuco were generally praised for their cooperation and fealty under Philip IV, evidenced by a memorial of Juan Grau y Monfalcon procurador general (Procurator General of the Philippines) in 1636. Grau detailed their nonrebellious nature, valiance in fighting alongside the Spaniards, competence in shipbuilding (especially in Pasacao) and as proficient boat rowers; he proposed honoring such individuals with higher ranks in the militia.

==== Ciudad de Nueva Cáceres in the 18th century ====
Nueva Cáceres in the 18th century underwent heavy demographic changes, with migration from the Manila Galleon brought about many Chinese migrants, Spanish peninsulares, and among many Filipino ethnicities across the archipelago, inflating the aggregate population by 1,576 in the years 1738 and 1744 according to a Franciscan census.

A 1772 report of Bishop Antonio de Luna established the four pueblecillos (little town) of Naga, Tabuco, Sta. Cruz, and Camaligan, and a total population of about 1,200 villagers per locality; this was a natural evolution from the ward-oriented propios of the 16th and mid-17th century. In a 1776 census report, Naga then had 964 while Camaligan had 1,666. Some of the pueblecillos in the 18th century had attained the zenith of their territorial expanse: Sta. Cruz, by far the largest, had the visitas "Peña de Francia, Tarosanan, Sungay, Dalipay, or Dominding, and Pasacao." Both Tabuco and Naga only had a single visita each, with Tabuco having Burabod, whereas Naga had Sorral, where present-day Peñafrancia Avenue is located. More visitas were established in the following decades.

===== Chinese discrimination =====
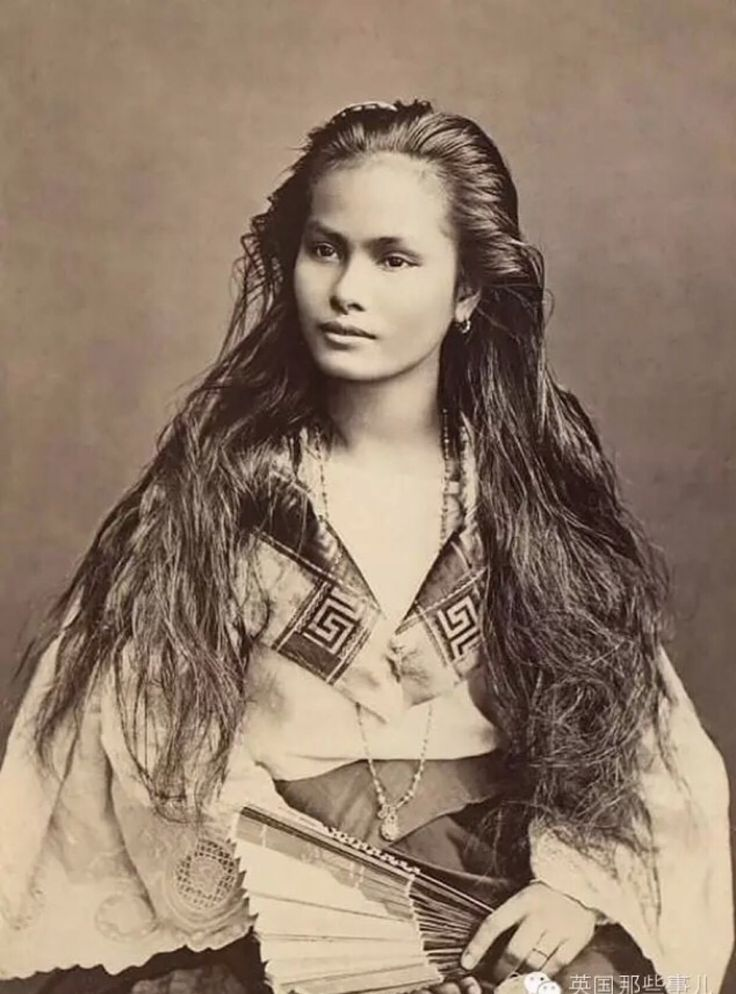
A high-class Sangley woman, usually found selling in the Pariancillo of Nueva Caceres.

The first Chinese settlers and eventually merchants of Nueva Cáceres were dated to have arrived around the mid-17th century, with San Gregorio's report reporting "some 10 or 12 houses..." by 1650. Known as "Sangley," from "xung-lei" meaning "merchant" in Pinyin, the Chinese were predominantly merchants by trade, with most originating from Molo, Iloilo. These Sangleyes came to form the "Pariáncillo" (small Parián) of Nueva Cáceres. But, in time, they eventually grew to be the victims of the colonists' and natives' racist policies, implemented to deliberately restrict their social mobility in the diocese. In 1725, a bishop forbade "the faithful" to listen to Chinese music or watch any of their stageplays as "they were full of superstition and idolatry." Even Rev. Fr. Isidro Arevalo in 1742 requested Gov.-Gen. Gaspar de la Torre y Ayala to deny immigrant Sangleyes travel permits into the city.

In 1741, Arevalo issued the year's Arancel Eclesiastico (a kind of church tariff), which often stratified demographics by social caste. The mestizo sangleyes were categorized along with indio principales and criollos, racially implied as privileged, whereas full-blooded sangleyes and españoles were expected to shoulder a greater fee. A prerequisite to be issued a "domestic residential visa" was to be accustomed with the Doctrina Christiana, of which many non-Hispanicized Sangleyes lacked this requirement. Because of such discriminatory stipulations, much of the collective Chinese community left for elsewhere.

===== The origins of Our Lady of Peñafrancia (1696−1741) =====
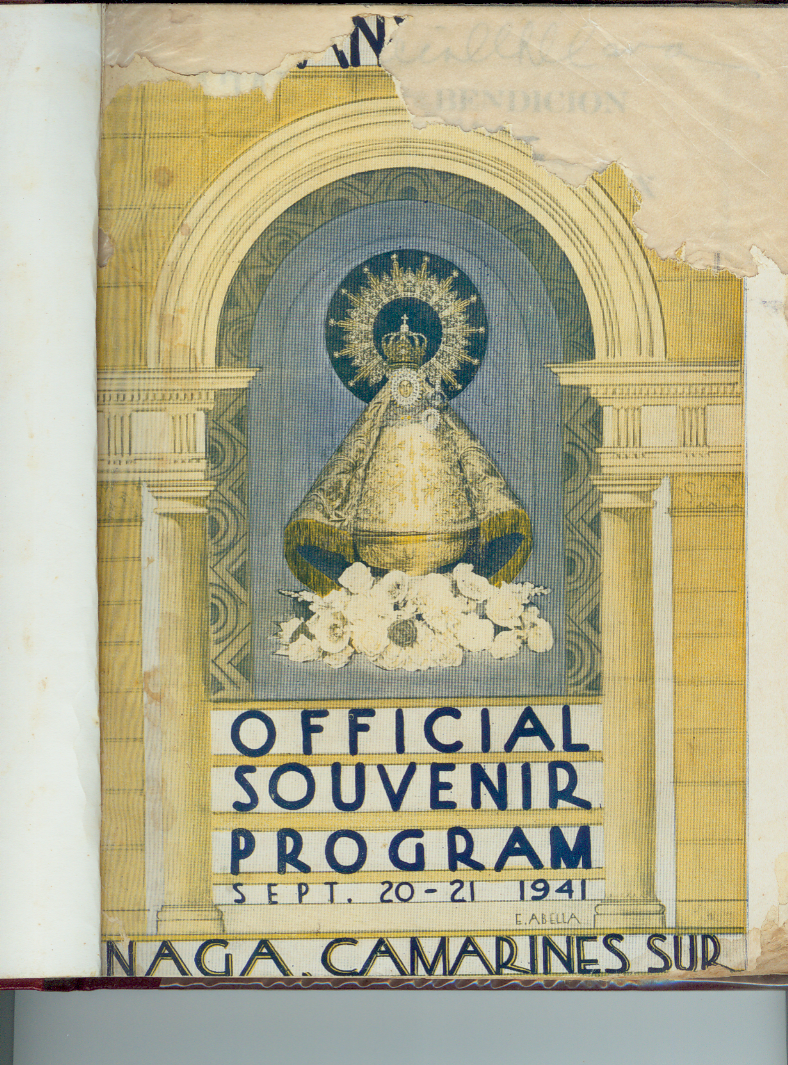
A souvenir magazine for the Our Lady of Peñafrancia Festival c. 1941

In 1696 or 1697, Rev. Fr. Miguel Robles de Covarrubias, O.P. was assigned to a small parish of the Diocese of Cáceres. A seminarian of the University of Sto. Tomas, he carried the Marian devotion of Virgin of Peña de Francia from his hometown in Salamanca where he would often apply the devotion's face card upon his sickly father's body as a "cure"; his father being a Spanish official in the Philippines facilitated his ordainment in the Diocese of Cáceres. For such intent, Covarrubias vowed to enshrine his devotion in Nueva Cáceres.

Throughout the early 1700s, Bishop Fray Andrés González of the diocese had gradually promoted Covarrubias to pastor, vicar general, then provisor of the old cathedral. Under his tutelage, he was given an opportunity to proselytize the Virgin devotion to the upland nomadic tribes from Isarog petitioning to reside in a sitio within the diocese's jurisdiction. González appointed Covarrubias as their pastor, with him preaching the Virgin of Peña de Francia in a rudimentary structure. In 1709, Covarrubias, with the support from González, ordered the construction of a much sturdier chapel, being finished the following year.

In the early 18th century, the Marian devotion fully flourished as a regional symbol of pilgrimage, with people reportedly flocking to the chapel during Saturday Novenas and masses. Covarrubias was shortly re-appointed to Manila, unknown whether he was dead or alive by 1741, where Most Rev. Ysidro de Arevalo, DD had established the chapel as a stone edifice.

===== Galleon monopoly and the effects of polo y servicio =====
Throughout the 18th century, "polo y servicio" (forced labor) became increasingly abused by the colonial authorities through the mass conscription of indios of Naga and Tabuco into the astilleros (shipyard) of porttowns such as Pasacao in the assembly of galleons and in portering maritime trade, primarily employed via the repartimiento system by the alcaldes-mayores involved in private monopolies. This was attested by Bishop Matos on 13 June 1759:

"...the custom of paying not more than a real for the baggage work at Pasacao should be condemned as unjust, exception is made when the work is completed in only two days from the time the indio left his house until his return there."

— Manuel Matos, El Obpo de Nueba Cazeres en phelipinas supl a VM que se digne de mander para alivio de los Yndios de los dos Obpdos Nueba Cazeres y Nueba Segobia vacante

Notwithstanding the injustices experienced by the indios exploited in the galleon trade, the production of commodities supplementing the shipyards providing indios daily wages, such as the abaca rope industry, also grew increasingly corrupt.

===== Continuation of poverty =====
The limited forages of Nueva Cáceres for amassed agrarian reformation, the town's interdependence on the other pueblos for basic supplies, and the widespread exploitation of the native population by their colonial wards and the royal authorities resulted in immense population and capital flight. As early as 4 May 1703, Rev. Fr. Andrés González described the troubled state of the cathedral of which could only exist through donations, detailed in an excerpt of his report to Philip V of Spain:

"...the cathedral...is so poor...it does not even have any amount for its annual expenses for its ornaments...it is so poor that it does not have any income which Your Majesty had appropriated nor from where it may come..."

— Rev. Fr. Andrés González, 4 May 1703

This cycle of poverty endured throughout the breadth of the century, through 1792 as implied by Bishop Domingo Collantes.

===== Beginning of industrialization (1704−1780s) =====
On 23 August 1704, Gov.-Gen. Don Domingo de Zabalburu y Balanchana de Echavarri ratified the creation of the Real Compra de Bandala for Camarines (a system forcing natives to sell rice at low, fixed prices for the Manila government and to supply the Galleon Trade), outlining an initial quota of 4,000 chinantas or 25,000 kilograms of abaca and 2,000 gantas or 6,000 litres of oil. These were received by the alcalde-mayor and juez of Camarines in Nueva Cáceres on 9 November of the same year but were ultimately left unhonored.

For the span of 50 years, this fundamentally aided the industrialization of Nueva Cáceres in cordage manufacture. According to the Gov.-Gen. Don Francisco José de Ovando's report on 9 August 1752, it was mentioned that the province of Camarines was a major abaca supplier to the Manila-based Real Compra de Bandala, supplying "4,000 chinantas of abaca at two pesos per chinanta...in the cordonerias (cordage factory)." Simply put, by the mid-century, supposedly around 1750, according to Jesuit historian Pedro Murrillo Velarde, Nueva Cáceres had already undergone industrialization through its first cordage factory.

On 10 March 1785, the Real Compañia de Filipinas (Royal Company of the Philippines) was issued a decree to import Philippine products to Spain and Europe, especially silk and mulberry relative to Camarines. In 1795, the pueblos of Tabuco, Naga, and Sta. Cruz were notable for their high agricultural yield, being turned into plantations under the authority of alcalde-mayor Carlos Connelly and the locality's cabezas. Tabuco had accumulated 150 mulberry, Naga, 15,127 mulberry and 172 trunks of pepper, and Sta. Cruz with 1,000 plants. Due to the reported productivity, a Chinese silkworm expert was sent and the Royal Company built a short-lived silk factory in Nueva Cáceres.

In 1785, the presence of the Royal Company in Nueva Cáceres also brought about the introduction of the tobacco monopoly. Two years later, in 1787, a civic-wide incident occurred where the city's residents, especially the rice farmers enduring harsh farming conditions of amihan, succumbed to tobacco addiction. The natives also grew impatient of the colonial government's payment for the indebted tobacco acquired from their plantations, enlargening the social unrest that culminated in a city-wide arson. The intercession of the bishop and the diocesan clergy ultimately killed the tobacco trade in Nueva Cáceres.

===== Sole Moro raid in Nueva Cáceres (September 1757) =====
In September 1757, a Moro excursion that destroyed 10 Camarines towns entered Nueva Cáceres under of the cover of night. While the entire city evacuated sporadically, Fr. Manuel Matos remained in the convent where the church and the rest of the city were seemingly spared. On 29 June 1758, Matos recorded in his letter to Charles III of Spain:

"...undoubtedly greater than at any other time."

— Matos, 29 June 1758, Domingo Abella, Bikol Annuls (Manila: n.p., 1954), 1:105-06.

Late 18th century Nueva Caceres

"A street running from south to north. From the Episcopal Palace Garden follows the Royal Warehouse made of stone. From there follows a long line of private houses. At the back of the Episcopal Palace stands a factory building of the garden of some two hundred brazas length, made of bamboo and straw. Returning to the seminary which is near the river, it is followed by various houses, and fronting the warehouse is the Casa Real made of stone where the alcalde-mayor resides and is also near the river. This is what is known as the city formed by districts of Tabuco, Sta. Cruz, and Naga, administered by the Franciscans and which tend to both sides of the mentioned river of Naga."

— Most Rev. Fr. Domingo Collantes, 1792

===== Outward expansion of infrastructure =====
In 1764, under the guidance of Bishop Manuel Matos along with the local principalía, a road was constructed in Sta. Cruz dubbed later in subsequent decades as "Igualdad." (present-day Gen. Luna St.), the first significant public infrastructure built in a long time. Despite the swampy trail, this was cleared and from 1783, it began to host processions to and from churches during annual Feasts of the Holy Rosary and Holy Week.

By 1791, two bridges made of wood, bamboo, and palm leaves were erected across the Naga river from Nueva Cáceres to both Naga and Tabuco (now the Panganiban and Tabuco Bridge). The construction of these bridges virtually ended centuries of racial segregation between the local indios and the Spaniards; from then on out, the socioeconomic disparities of a cosmopolitan Nueva Cáceres were to be blurred by this act of reconciliation to create a much inclusive society.

==== Ciudad de Nueva Cáceres in the 19th century ====
For hundreds of years during the Spanish colonial era, Naga grew to become the center of trade, education, and culture, and the seat of ecclesiastical jurisdiction in Bicol. The city became large and prosperous as the 1818 Spanish census recorded the area as having 5,739 native families and a large number of Spanish-Filipino families that then ballooned to 301 in number.

=== Nueva Cáceres during the Philippine Revolution (1896-1899) ===
==== The "Fifteen Martyrs of Bicol" ====
After the discovery of Andrés Bonifacio's Katipunan in 1896, Gov.-Gen. Ramón Blanco's colonial administration escalated crackdown efforts throughout the archipelago on similar large-scale and non-clerical societies such as the Freemasonry. From August to December 1896, the civil government of Ambos Camarines under Gov. Ricardo Lacosta had issued several orders of arrest against certain individuals across the province, especially those with ties to fraternal societies modelled similarly to the Katipunan. In protest, an influential native of Nueva Cáceres, Ramon Feced, formed the revolutionary militia unit called the "Cuerpo de Voluntarios."

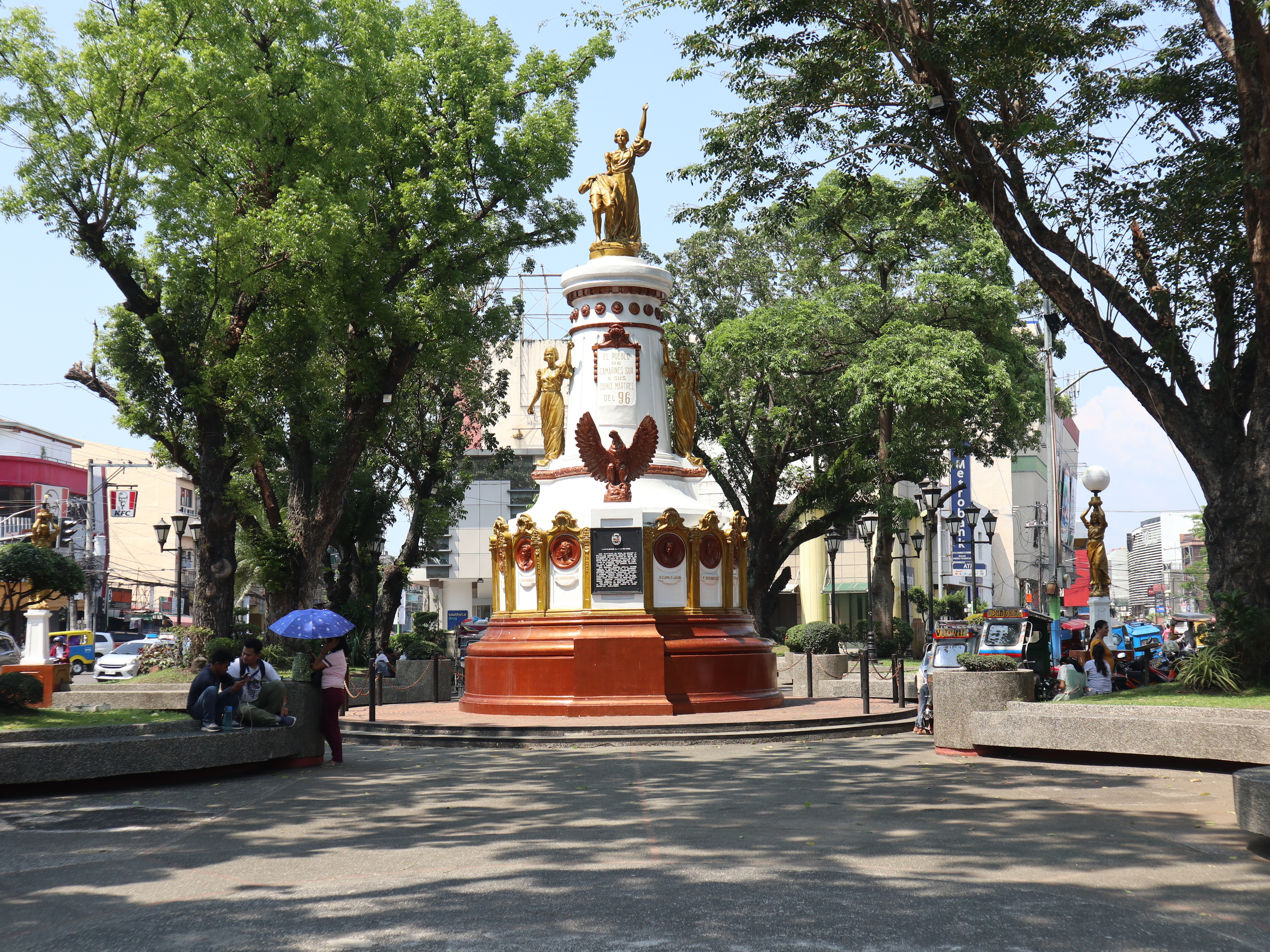
A monument in Naga City built in 1919 to commemorate the Fifteen Martyrs of Bicol during the Philippine Revolution.

11 of the 15 martyrs were sentenced to death by musketry in Bagumbayan, Laguna (now Rizal Park) on 3 January 1897: Tomas Prieto, Mariano Melgarejo, Florencio Lerma, Macario Valentin, Gabriel Prieto, Manuel Abella, Cornelio Mercado, Domingo Abella, Camilo Jacob, Severino Diaz and Inocencio Herrera.

The remaining four martyrs were sentenced differently: Leon Hernandez was imprisoned in the Nueva Cáceres Municipal Jail where he was tortured to death; Mariano Ordenaza was sentenced to a 20-year imprisonment in Bilibid by the Consejo Real, later dying behind bars; both Ramon Abella and Mariano Arana were exiled off to Fernando Po Island in Spanish Guinea where Arana succumbed to malaria while Abella was pardoned, later dying in Cartagena, Spain.

==== Locally led revolt of Angeles and Plazo (1898) ====
On 18 September 1898, Gen. Vicente Lukbán's successful military campaign in Ambos Camarines, and subsequently throughout the peninsula, prompted reactive Spaniard authorities to disarm the local Guardia Civil garrison in Nueva Cáceres, disclosing to them that they were to be in active deployment in Iloilo against the Revolutionary Government.

Initial frights of an organized mass execution by Spanish auxiliaries immediately escalated into an internal revolutionary plot in the span of a single day, organized by Corporals Elias Angeles and Felix Plazo with majority support among the units against the Spanish. Their uprising was partly inspired by Ildefonso Moreno's quelled revolt in Daet, being a part of the contingent that quashed the rebellion.

During Nueva Cáceres' Peñafrancia Festival on 18 September, the Spanish decided to rearm the Guardia Civil upon considerations of an insufficient Spaniard police force incapable of crowd control. The Guardia Civil rebels utilized the festivities throughout the day as cover to the preparatory prelude of Nueva Cáceres' uprising. At midnight, the revolutionaries caught the civil authorities by surprise in their sleep, forcing a citywide battle throughout the entire night. The rebels executed key Spanish officials such as Capt. Francisco Andreu, Ambos Camarines' Guardia Civil commander, along with his family; and Lt. Miguel Dias de Montiel with his wife sharing a midnight coffee.

The remaining Imperial personnel numbering 400 resorted to the besieged San Francisco convent, to which the rebels threatened to burn the church if the defense had not surrendered by 14:00. A Fr. Gonzales of the convent served as an intermediary, establishing contact with the rebels. 25 weapons were surrendered, with the following on the next day. Don Vicente Zaldin expressed the total capitulation of the Spanish defense. The terms of capitulation were formally signed at the women's college Colegio de Sta. Isabel, taking effect at 10:00 on 20 September 1898.

From then on, Angeles assumed the position of Gobernador Politico-Militar, with Plazo as the commander of the Guardia Civil. Upon the arrival of Gen. Lukban in October 1898 by the detachment led by Capt. Arcadio Gisala, the Spanish authorities were officially declared as ousted from office upon the constitutional institution of the Philippine Revolutionary Government.

A city ordinance, passed by the Naga City Government, designates September 19 as Liberation Day in the City of Naga. This is ordinance number 2006-050. The ordinance also outlines activities for commemorating Liberation Day and allocates funds to support them.

==== Aguinaldo government in Naga (1898) ====
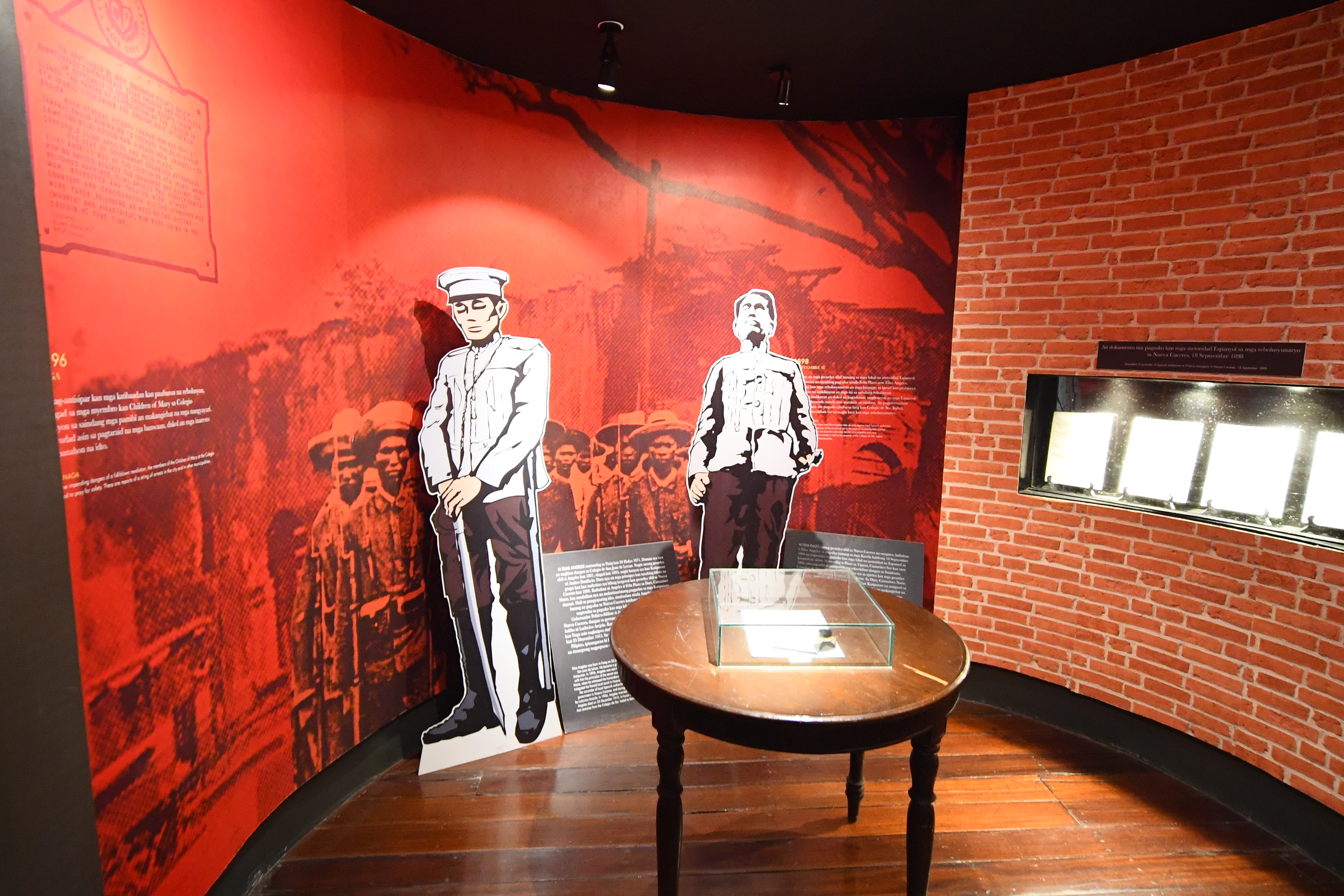
A display at Museo Historico de Universidad de Sta. Isabel depicting Elias Angeles and Felix Plazo, two Bicolano revolutionaries during the Spanish period.

In December 1899, Commander-in-Chief Gen. Emilio Aguinaldo divided the revolutionary territories of the Bicol Region into four military districts, with Nueva Cáceresserving as the headquarters of the Ambos Camarines-Catanduanes sector. Gen. Lukban was put in charge of this district and was then subsequently succeeded by Freemasons of both Bicol and Tagalog origin.

Their administration however proved notoriously controversial to the natives that "felt disdain toward the Tagalogs (that) virtually invaded them", especially with their alleged mistreatment of the imprisoned Spanish clergy and some select Bicolanos. An incident occurred where a certain Lt. Vicente Vasquez of the revolutionary administration was convicted by a court-martial for killing Fr. Mariano Villafuerte, the then-parish priest of the Cathedral.

Nevertheless, on January 17, 1899, the newly established provincial civil government, led by Presidente Provincial Mariano Abella, Counselor of Justice Francisco Alvarez, Counselor of Police Eduardo Robles, and Counselor of Revenue Mariano Mella, continued to co-exist with the Aguinaldo government, subjugated at times by military authority.

=== Invasion of Nueva Cáceres during the Philippine-American War (1899−1900) ===
==== Background ====
The United States' refusal to recognize both the terms of the Filipino delegates enshrined in the Treaty of Paris and the First Philippine Republic's sovereignty eventually sparked the first engagement of Filipino combatants with American forces in the Battle of Manila on 4 February 1899.

==== Defense of Ambos Camarines ====
Shortly after the battle, President Emilio Aguinaldo relegated Gen. Antonino M. Guevarra under Gen. Lukban's command in the defense of Ambos Camarines and Nueva Cáceres. In early 1899, approximately 1,700 Republican soldiers and additional municipal militias collectively referred to as the Sandatahanes comprised Guevarra's main fighting force, with a roster of native commanders such as Colonel Bernabe Dimalibot, Col. Ludovico Arejola, Col. Ursua, and Lt.-Col. Elias Angeles.

In late 1899, the Republican army, with the compounding losses in the northern Tagalog region, commenced with a fallback strategy based on guerilla warfare in desperation. The attritional warfare against a superior force thereby crippled Arejola's numbers to just 500 personnel by the time the Americans arrived in Ambos Camarines in early 1900.

==== American landings into Ambos Camarines (February 1900) ====
On the early morning of 20 February 1900, two battalions on the USS Montañez from both the 45th Regiment, led by a Major Cole, and 40th Regiment, led by a Maj. Casey, of Gen. John C. Bates' and James M. Bell's 1st Division, XIII Army Corps, led by a Lieutenant-Colonel Parker, was the first contingent in Ambos Camarines, landing four miles off Calabanga.

On the same day, a battalion of the 40th Regiment, led by a Maj. McNamee, landed on a marshy shore three kilometers from Barcelonita, with the regiment commander, Col. Godwin, leading the push inward. This detachment encountered fierce resistance in the town of Libmanan led by Col. Ursua, leading to a notorious two-day skirmish that resulted in the deaths of 64 Filipinos and wounding 21 others in total on both sides.

From 8:15 to 16:00, Lt.-Col. Parker's contingent endured heavy attritional warfare waged by Bikolano guerillas from the beachhead to the town of Calabanga. Capt. Cogswell, one of the company commanding officers of Maj. Cole's battalion, managed to successfully capture Calabanga in the late afternoon of the 20th.

==== Inland skirmishes into Ambos Camarines ====
At 7:15 on the following morning, the rest of the Lt.-Col. Parker's companies, excluding Maj. Casey's, marched toward Barrio Carolina. After three hours, they occupied the barrio without resistance, albeit they stumbled upon an abandoned armory, destroying it subsequently. Carolina, the highlands of Nueva Cáceres, was the first district of the city to succumb to the American occupation. At 2:00 PM, this detachment carried their pursuit towards Palestina. During the march, Maj. Cole's battalion found a certain "Rodriguez" for directions, leading his unit into the contigious swamp, whether maliciously or not, then ultimately into the middle of a wide rice paddy. During this period, fleeing revolutionaries on the same road managed to transport all the Spanish prisoners in the adjacent localities further from the front.

Maj. Cole's battalion was forced to retreat for the night. After a lake-crossing on the following morning, the unit made its way into Barrio Concepcion. This detachment witnessed "a considerable number of Filipinos wielding rifles, arrows, and bolos" on the road to Nueva Cáceres from Concepcion, although the expeditionary forces largely held this sight with disregard.

==== Logistical errors ====
In the morning of the 21st, the seven remaining companies directly led by Gen. Bates landed at Barrio Cabusao after some reconfiguration with the watercraft Marietta, Tartar, and Baltimore after Montañez ran aground on the mouth of the Bicol River. At evening, the USS Paragua arrived at San Miguel Bay to ferry the beached company aboard the Montañez, forming a flotilla after the vessel's reshoring. The entire western detachment converged at Libmanan, crossing the Bicol River at 10:30.

A map of Nueva Cáceres' extent in the province of Ambos Camarines from the late 19th century to the early 20th century.

==== Skirmishes in the outskirts of Nueva Cáceres ====
At noon, the collective expeditionary force under Gen. Bates had marched from Cabusao to Magarao, now bound for Nueva Cáceres. B Company of the 45th Regiment defended the ford while the whole of E Company boarded boats tugged by the Paragua heading for the capital. The native guerillas committed to a scorched earth policy upon their arrival to Magarao, attested by the immolation of Quipayo Church, Calabanga Town Hall, and eventually the Canaman parish.

==== Capture of Nueva Cáceres ====
Lt.-Col. Parker's contingent in Barrio Concepcion marched toward Nueva Cáceres in the afternoon of the 22nd, suspecting a resistance numbering "50 rifles, two cannons and a group of macheter wielders." Meanwhile, the rest of the battalions towed by the USS Paragua docked at Nueva Cáceres' quay at about 14:00, with the contingent having disembarked completely by 16:30 with Gen. Bates himself and his staff. Lt.-Col. Parker and Gen. Bates bivouacked at the city center, organizing into one unit in the abandoned locality.

Gen. Guevarra demanded the evacuation of the entire city from the advancing American expeditionaries. The Spanish and Chinese communities were "ordered to leave before the invaders arrived." The retreating revolutionaries dragged Spanish prisoners, dubbed "cazadores" (hunters), into the slopes of Mt. Isarog, Pasacao, and southern Libmanan.

==== Subsequent resistance and total capitulation (1901) ====
In spite of the resistance that was continued by self-appointed General and Commander-in-Chief Ludovico Arejola from that year to the following year, Nueva Cáceres became the salient of the American forces into the five military districts of the Bikolano guerillas.

Then, on 31 March 1901, Arejola formally ordered the complete capitulation of Bikolano resistance from his mountain camp south of the Minalabac River. Arejola and his forces were escorted by two sole American officers, surrendering unconditionally to Gen. Bates, Lt. Gen. George Curry of the 11th Cavalry, and 2nd Lt. George V. H. Mosley of the 9th Cavalry in the provincial capitol of Nueva Cáceres.

Arejola reportedly surrendered with a force of 800 men in total, along with 43 rifles, 12 revolvers and hundreds of bolo knives. In commemoration of their surrender, the "Teatro Aguinaldo" was erected somewhere in Nueva Cáceres in 1901.

=== American colonial period ===
==== Reduction of Spanish-era cuidad bureaucracy (1900−1909) ====
The American colonial period of Nueva Cáceres begun in 1901 with the encampment of the transitional Third Military District of the Department of South Luzon with the city as its headquarters, first led by Gen. Kobbe then Gen. Bell. On January 31, 1901, the Spanish "Cuidad de Nueva Cáceres" was eventually reduced to an American-styled municipality by virtue of Act No. 82. On October 23, 1903, Act No. 959 of the Philippine Commission annexed the municipalities of Canaman and Camaligan into Nueva Cáceres' recognized territory in furtherance of centralization efforts. An excerpt of the legislation read:

"The municipality of Nueva Caceres shall consist of its present territory and that of the municipalities of Camaligan and Canaman, except the barrios of Talidtid and Fundado in the present municipality of Canaman, with the seat of the municipal government at the present municipality of Nueva Caceres."

— Philippine Commission, Act No. 959, 23 October 1903, Section 1.4

Notwithstanding this diminution, Nueva Cáceres was still widely recognized as the cultural, religious, and commercial capitol of the Bicol Region, with the incipient porttown of Legazpi serving as the "economic epicenter".

In 1909, Canaman and Camaligan seceded as independent municipalities by efforts of Philippine Legislature 6th Senatorial District Rep. Tomas Arejola from the territorial jurisdiction of Nueva Cáceres, thus the reduction in 4.22% of its population (19,223 to 9,393) from 1903 to 1918.

==== Nationalism and the renaming of Nueva Cáceres to Naga (1901−1919) ====
In the early decades following the Philippine Revolution, an unprecedented surge in Filipino and Bikolano nationalism, unimpeded by tolerant authorities, formulated a new regional policy to the urbanites of Nueva Cáceres, both through the romanticization of the Filipiniana period with its revolutionary heroes (the late 19th century) and embracing linguistic purism in place and street names.

===== Namechange to Naga (February 1914) =====
These increased nationalistic sentiments were the main causes of Nueva Cáceres' name-change. Eventually, on 28 February 1914, by virtue of Act No. 2390 along with other different municipalities nationwide, the by-then 335-year old Spanish name of Nueva Cáceres was officially renamed to its native and present-day name "Naga," based on the pre-Hispanic settlement on the opposite bank to Nueva Cáceres. Below is a verbatim excerpt of Act 2390 guaranteeing the namechange.

...that of Nueva Caceres, Province of Ambos Camarines, to Naga;...

— Philippine Legislature, Act No. 2390, February 28, 1914, Section 1

===== Dissolution of Ambos Camarines and Plaza Rizal (March 1919) =====
On 3 March 1919, the dissolution of Ambos Camarines into Camarines Sur and Camarines Norte, by virtue of Act No. 2809, led to the subsequent replacement of the Alfonso XII monument with the Rizal monument in the newly dubbed "Plaza Rizal" also from the name "Plaza Alfonso XII," sculpted by famed artist Crispulo Zamora.

==== Thomasite-based curriculum reform in Naga (1901−1940s) ====
On 21 January 1901, Act No. 74 was enacted into law, creating the Department of Public Instruction (DPI). On 21 August of the same year, approximately 500 educators from different institutions across the continental United States arrived in Manila aboard USAT Thomas, whom they came to know themselves as "Thomasites."

In 1902, the Vacation Normal School in Nueva Cáceres was opened to native educators, facilitating the fast growth of primary and secondary education in the municipality.

In 1903, a North American-styled grammar school in Nueva Cáceres was opened by the DPI where it immediately amassed a daily attendance of 39 pupils; many recognized the residents of Nueva Cáceres, especially Americans in particular, to be insatiable for knowledge. By around 1905, according to the annual census, daily primary school attendance defaulted at 951.

On July 15, 1903, the first Thomasite high school in Nueva Cáceres was opened to the public known as the "Provincial High School of Nueva Cáceres," (now Camarines Sur National High School) headed by Principal Frank L. Crone and his female assistant. Erstwhile, this high school reached as far as 185 daily attendees.

==== Logging industry, abaca trade, and electrification (1900s−1916) ====
===== Nueva Cáceres' logging boom (1900s) =====
From the wake of the American administration, their architecture styles, most particularly observed in then-Nueva Cáceres, were oriented more toward frugality and mass-manufacturing with structures ordained to be made primarily of wood, with Art Deco prevailing as a major architectural design.

This led to the lumber business boom in both Camarines Sur and Norte during the early 19th-century fixed in the venture town of Naga, amounting to a ₱7.2 million peso-worth logging industry (hundreds of millions of pesos in 2025 standards). Many domestic hardware firms arose from this period such as the American Marsman Development Co., Villasol Lumber Mill, one of local politician Mariano Villafuerte's countless ventures, and Bicol Lumber Mill.

===== Nueva Cáceres' housing boom (1930s) =====
Lumber aided the proliferation of subdivision housing in Naga, the first of its kind in the late 1930s pre-war. One of these were the Modern Naga Subdivision, in present-day Bagumbayan Sur, which was once a swampy area and had to undergo tenacious terraforming before its parcels could be sold commercially. The subdivision's proprietor was the brother of Bishop Pedro Paulo Santos, the Bishop of Cáceres, and thus encouraged Manila-based Jesuits to erect an Ateneo institution in the municipality of Naga. From the late 1930s, construction firms also organized themselves as a profitable trade in Naga, with a few such as Luis Tayag's San Angelo Construction Co. spearheading the construction of what would become Ateneo de Naga's first main building.

===== Nueva Cáceres' involvement in the abaca trade (1900s) =====
Aside from local logging, the Insular Government also stimulated Nueva Cáceres' historical abaca trade through a concerted allocation for agrarian commerce. According to the 1903 census, approximately 98,259 piculs (an archaic Chinese measurement based on the weight of a carrying pole) or 5.9 gigagrams of manila hemp out of Ambos Camarines' 251,969. Then, in 1905, Nueva Cáceres yielded about 36,702, indicating a significant decrease in the municipality and divestment to Albay's native plantations.

===== Electrification in Naga (February 1916) =====
On 24 February 1916, Mariano Abella, an influential magnate, was granted a 50-year electrical franchise to operate exclusively in Naga and in surrounding municipalities by virtue of Act No. 2647. An excerpt of Act 2647 entails:

"...there is hereby granted to Mariano Abella y Isaac, his successors or assigns, for a period of fifty years from the passage of this Act, the right, privilege, and authority, to construct, maintain, and operate in all streets, public thoroughfares, and public places within the limits of the municipality of Naga, Province of Ambos Camarines, Philippine Islands, poles, wires, and all necessary apparatus and appurtenances for the transmission and distribution of currents for electric power, heat, and light, and for any other purpose for which electricity may be used, and to furnish electric power, heat, and light..."

— Philippine Legislature, Act No. 2647, 24 February 1916, Section 1

===== Birth of theatre and American recreation in Naga (1920s) =====
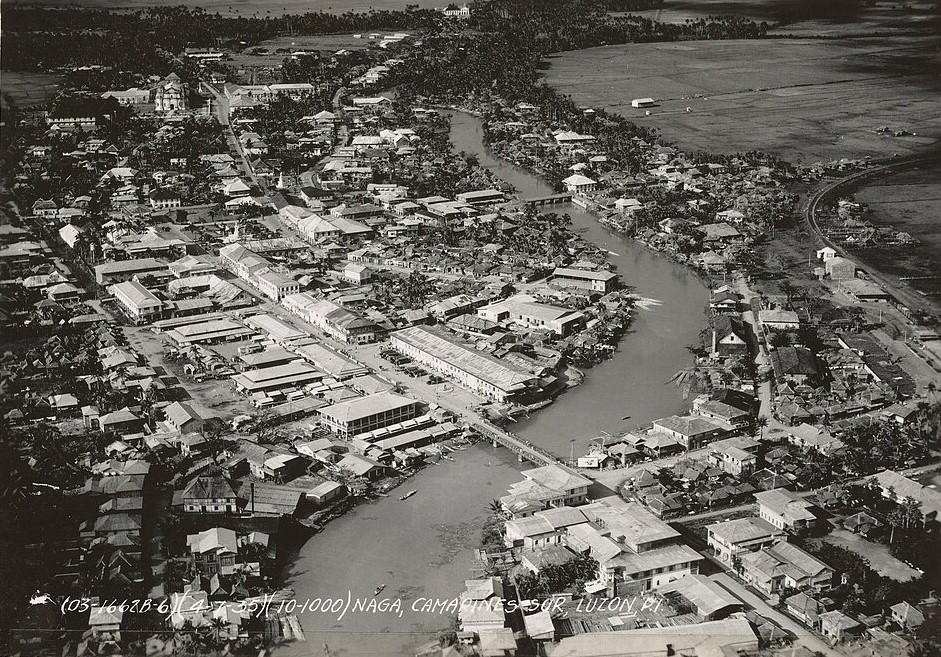
Naga, Camarines Sur (1935)

The unprecedented investment into franchised electricity ushered in a new era of industry and commerce for Naga and Camarines Sur during the 1920s, especially with the arrival of Western recreation during the early 19th century including organized American sports, such as basketball and baseball, along with silent theatre.

During the 1920s, the historical theatre scene in Naga emerged upon the screening of the first silent motion picture in Naga, with Cine Union serving as the locality's first moviehouse from 1910 onwards by businessman Bernard McGinley; albeit, the establishment experienced financial difficulties and was thus closed in 1924. Cine Cita in the 1920s was another moviehouse that suffered the same malaise. In 1923, the first theatre by migrant couples Victor Bichara Sr. and Emily Panayotti, Lebanese and Palestinian, was established from a purchased lot of land by Robert Manley, a famous American lawyer whom resided in Naga.

==== Plaza Quince Martires (1926) ====
As nationalist and even regionalist sentiments grew deeply entrenched in Bikolano identity, the Fifteen Martyrs of Bikol were commemorated through the erection of Plaza Quince Martires and its monument in the mid-1920s. On 29 November 1926, both were inaugurated to the public, being designed by Crispolo Zamora and sculpted by Jose Barcena.

==== Foreign investment and rapid urban development in Naga (1920s−1940s) ====
Along with theatre came the introduction of global import investors into the municipality. In the late 1920s, the Manila-based Philippine corporation Erlanger and Galinger, Inc., a well-known importer of office supplies and electrical appliances, set up a regional distribution center in Naga. Aside from Erlanger and Galinger, Inc., other franchises in the 1920s such as the Singer Sewing Machine and the H.E. Heacock Co., which sold many imported appliances from brands such as Philco, Elgin National Watch Company, Morrison, and Frigidaire Appliance Company, set up local distribution offices and branches in Naga.

===== Hotel boom in Naga =====
During the 1930s, domestic commerce exacerbated by the municipality's economic momentum from the 1920s brought many business ventures and trade investments from across the archipelago. Short-term lodgings, such as inns and hotels, thereby became a popular source of income in Naga, as attested by the municipality top three hotels: the Libmanan Hotel, opened in February 1933 by cultural writer Jacinto Ursua, on Balintawak St. and the subsequent Bicol Hotel Grocery equipped with a restaurant and bakery; the relatively luxurious Ritz Hotel in the mid-1930s owned by Spanish mogul Jose Centenera, now replaced by the present-day Crown Hotel on corner Mabini and P. Burgos St.; and the Royal Hotel of Julio Ortiz.

Naga hotels during the 1920s to 1930s
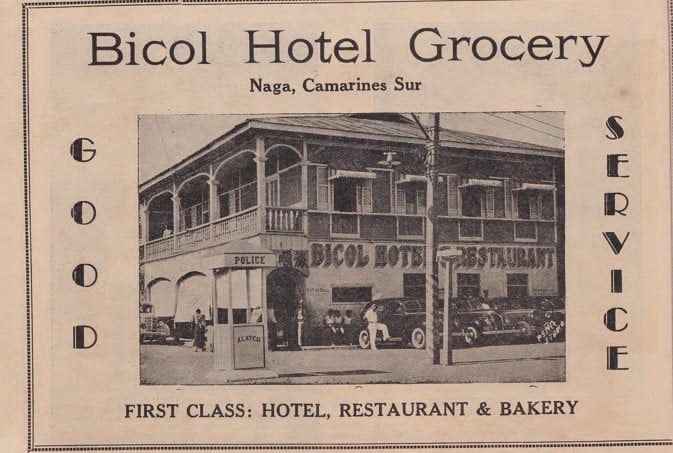
Another advertising for the Bicol Hotel Grocery c. 1939

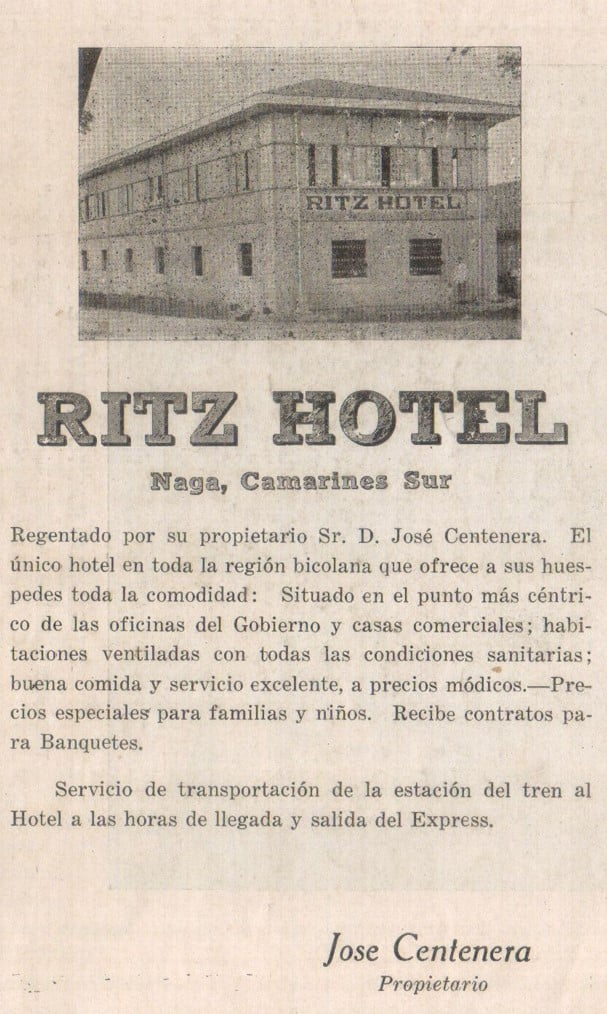
An advertising in the newspaper for the Ritz Hotel in Naga c. 1920s

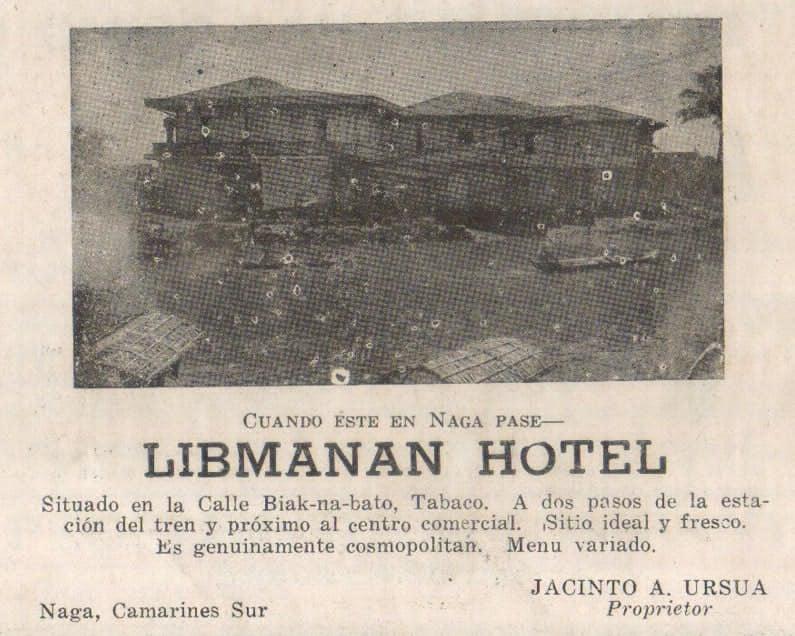
An advertising in the newspaper for the Libmanan Hotel in Naga c. 1920s

===== Cuisine popularity in Naga =====
Restaurants of various cuisines from gimmick-oriented joints, bakeries, to cafes, predominantly of both Chinese and American origin, boomed along with the commercialism of Naga in the 1920s to 1930s. A key few establishments included the Sanitary Bakery and Grocery, the Chinese pastry joint Cu To Cu, the Chinese-American restaurant Naga Rendezvous by Chinese national Yen Nuat, and the Antonio family's Bicol Café.

===== Domestic globally-competent industries =====
Despite the apparent Americanization of Naga's industrial complex, Spanish-era handicraft from the 19th century, such as the manufacture of buri fiber-based (Corypha elata) hats, cigars, and cigar cases in Camaligan, were still in high demand.

Chinese-Filipino industrialists in Naga owned two chewing tobacco factories, with mogul Dy Chiao's own production line proving most popular, La Suavidad, along with other of his tobacco "La Patria" and "Katipunan." During the rapid period of civic industrialization, a globally-renowned textile distributor from across Asia, Europe, and America, the La Simpatica Fabrica de Moscada, which manufactured La Simpatica cigarettes, opened two exclusive branches in Naga during the 1920s: Bazar Elegencia and La Bella Bicolana both on Gen. Luna St and belonging under the Chinese corporation Yu So and Company.

=== World War II and Japanese occupation ===
==== Background ====
In the days after the Pearl Harbor attacks on 7 December 1941, Naga, like other provincial capitals, experienced a mass exodus of civilians in fear of the Japanese invasion. Local newspapers from news in Manila, along with professionals and well-off families who owned shortwave radios, quickly fuelled fears of a Japanese occupation in Naga. Parents with children studying in Manila wired them fare money to return home, with many families leaving on foot to other deeper rural municipalities or beyond.

On the morning of 8 December 1941, Japanese nationals who resided in Camarines Sur during that time, notably Matsuzo "Santiago" Kitaguchi, a former construction worker of the Camarines Sur High School and business partner of Mori's Ki Mori parlor; Mori, the owner of a famous pre-war maiz con hielo and mongo con hielo refreshment parlor called Ki Mori; Hisato Kubota, a palay agent of Mr. Chunaco and business partner of Mori in the Naga Bazaar; Takeru Suga, the owner of Lion Bazaar; Buso Sasaki, Kitahara; Berto Nishiyama; and more, were interned at the Naga Provincial Jail by the Naga Philippine Constabulary detachment under suspicion of being Imperial Japanese Army intelligence agents.

Civic life grew frantic and almost lawless as the Japanese drew closer to Naga. Panic-buying depleted the locality's supplies of foodstuffs and basic subsistence. Widespread looting emerged, motivated by an idea spread by someone that "everything would fall into enemy hands (anyway)", against the eight Japanese retails then Naga's Chinese establishments thoroughly robbed by mobs and torched afterwards. This civil unruliness also entailed a higher crime rate during this period.

On 12 December, Mitsubushi F1M2s of the Imperial Japanese Army Air Service (IJAAS) flew above Naga, prompting a frenzied arming of the male civilian populace with Enfields and Spanish-era rifles. Trainees and reservists of local United States Armed Forces in the Far East (USAFFE) contingents were nevertheless mobilized, with 250 volunteers who marched from Pili arriving at Naga to defend Lucena from the Japanese beachhead in Lamon Bay. On the same day, the Japanese invasion of Legaspi had commenced. Upon capturing the largely uncontested town of Legazpi, the IJA's 16th Division, particularly the "Kimura Detachment" under Major-General Naoki Kimura, proceeded via Highway 1 en route to Naga 6 days later.

The Naga Philippine Constabulary received a brief coded telegram that said:

"Do not send any more messages in plain language. Send everything in code."

Around this time, Constabulary personnel, having reserved fears of the Japanese committing atrocities against uniformed personnel, wore plain clothes and some went into hiding along with the exodus altogether, effectively disbanding the Constabulary detachment in Naga.

With the perceived collapse of civil governance and law enforcement, Assemblyman Mariano E. Villafuerte appealed to then-Governor Ramon Imperial to return to Naga. Having been infected with a cold and a supposed refusal to greet the Japanese, Imperial relegated his authorities as Provincial Governor of Camarines Sur to Villafuerte. Wielding temporary prerogative, Villafuerte managed to "coax" the deserting officers and reorganize the Naga Philippine Constabulary detachment and reassured Nagueños that "the authorities were still there to protect life and property," along with the existence of the Commonwealth of the Philippines as a sovereign state.

==== Fall of Naga (December 1941) ====
On 14 December 1941, from 7:00 to 8:00 AM, a convoy belonging to the Kimura Detachment marched along Calle Panganiban from Pili toward Plaza Rizal and the Provincial Capitol. Governor Imperial specifically tasked his brother, Monico L. Imperial Sr., with greeting the Kimura Detachment in his absence. From the window of the Office of the Governor in the Capitol, he described the convoy consisting of "olive trucks filled with soldiers besides those on foot, artillery pieces pulled by horses, and all sorts of mechanized units occupuing the surrounding streets, the others farming out to the principal avenues of the city." Monico's description also gave insight on the first interactions between native Nagueños and the Japanese:

"As if out of nowhere, the remaining civilians gathered at the foot of the Rizal Monument in the Plaza to her a Japanese officer telling them not to be afraid, that they had come as friends. The Japanese officer advised the people to return to their homes and resume their normal life. He said that they had come to protect the people, that the Americans had fled and would never return."

— Monico L. Imperial Sr. (December 14, 1941), Naga: The Birth and Rebirth of a Historic City, Danilo M. Gerona

On the same day, the Japanese, upon learning of the jailed nationals, proceeded to the Provincial Jail and set them free. To the dismay of Naga's residents, some of the Japanese nationals Kubota, Suga, Kitahara, and Nishiyama turned out to be high-ranking IJA officers. Among them in particular was Hisato Kubota; described before the war as "a reserved and soft-spoken man who had learned Bicol...," he became "brusque and demanding," after being promoted to being the spokesperson of the occupation forces.

==== Puppet administration ====
The Japanese plans to prop up a provincial puppet administration was immediately brought to Monico Imperial's attention after being greeted. They probed Imperial on the whereabouts of political personalities Gov. Imperial, Ramon Felipe, and Villafuerte. The Japanese then subsequently sent military parties to locate the three across the contiguous municipalities, with Villafuerte eventually being found in Sipocot the following day.

From December 14 to 15, high-profile conferences were held between Villafuerte, Gov. Ramon Imperial, and Commander Denzo Kuriyama to discuss the local puppet government and their respective designations. Imperial felt apprehensive serving under the Japanese whereas Villafuerte maintained that Imperial was the legitimate Provincial Governor. Kuriyama, described as having been "in representation of the Imperial Japanese High Command, had begun to show signs of impatience."

Eventually, Villafuerte, with positive encouragement from Bishop Pedro P. Santos, Hon. Domingo Imperial, and Judge Robert E. Manley, took in the reigns as the puppet Provincial Governor on 16 December 1941. But, after the creation of the Japanese Military Administration in the Philippines (JMA) and the imposition of martial law on 3 January 1942, Villafuerte tried to give up his position by petitioning Imperial to retake his seat. Imperial refused, so, a week later, Villafuerte submitted a memorandum to Commissioner of Interior Beningo Aquino Sr. to forcibly reinstate Imperial as Provincial Governor. Despite a note sent by Aquino inviting Imperial to a Manila conference, nothing conducive ever materialized. In the middle of January, the Kempeitai housed in the Manley residence summoned the political elite to reiterate their supposedly altruistic mission to liberate Asia from the West through the Greater East Asia Co-Prosperity Sphere.

A few weeks later, exclusively strict Japanese cultural stipulations were imposed on Naga's residents: a prominent example being the requirement to bow at military sentries around certain parts of Naga, especially key entrances to the town. On Calle General Luna, before the Capitol, there was a painted outline of human feet where one must stand inside and bow properly. If there was an apparent infraction in bowing, Japanese sentinels would mete out a slap or a blow from an officer's cane.

==== Beginnings of the Camarines Sur guerilla war (1942) ====
Overall, Naga was relatively quiet before the onset of the local guerilla war. On 8 March 1942, Elias Madrid, Leon S.A. Aureus, and Juan Q. Miranda came together during Miranda's 30th birthday party at his residence in San Nicolas, Canaman to officially organize the Tangcong Vaca Guerilla Unit (TVGU). On the same month, the Camp Isarog Guerillas (CIG), led by Teofilo Padua and Faustino Flor from Upper Partido, was formed. Other local resistance movements would form within the vicinity of Camarines Sur, with practically all of them pledging their allegiance to the United States Armed Forces of the Far East.

In the early part of their existence, the TVGU and CIG, though independently operated from each other, focused on cutting Japanese supply lines in Naga by denying them key transportation and communication lines. The TVGU operated from the west of Camarines Sur relative to Naga whereas the CIG operated from the east.

==== Planning of the liberation of Naga ====
In the early months of 1942, local Japanese garrisons in Naga and Camarines Sur in general were quite minimal in strength due to the ongoing offensives in Central and Northern Luzon. According to a local resident, the Naga force numbered just roughly a hundred soldiers.

On 19 April 1942, Iriga was liberated by the CIG from its pro-Japanese administration, causing installed Mayor Manuel Crescini and the local Japanese garrison to flee to nearby Naga. Via Highway 1, they liberated the scarcely defended municipalities on the way to Naga from Iriga. Originally, the idea to liberate Naga was brought up by the TVGU's high-ranking officers during a conference in Oroc-osoc, Candato, Libmanan on 22 March. But, unlike the CIG who were furnished with Constabulary armaments, the relatively underequipped TVGU had to give up such ambition. On the early morning of 1 May, a CIG messenger had reached the TVGU in San Nicolas informing them that they were ready to attack Naga.

==== Liberation of Naga (1942) ====
On 1 May 1942, the Camp Isarog Guerilllas (CIG) from Upper Partido, led by Teofila Padua and Faustino Flor, along with other local resistance contingents, stormed the Japanese garrisons in Naga in bloody urban combat to liberate American and other foreign nationals imprisoned nationals at the Naga Provincial Capitol.

===== First day (1 May 1942) =====
At 4:00 AM, hundreds of CIG guerillas, armed with roughly a hundred American rifles such as M1903 Springfields and various shotguns, and many homemade firearms, along with some Agta bowmen, were positioned on the eastern bank of the Naga River. Their line ran parallel to the Naga River roughly a quarter of a kilometer away, running from the corner of the Naga and Mabolo River in Tabuco, across the rice fields on both sides of Calle Panganiban, all the way to Tinago. The Japanese, who had originally taken up defensive positions on the town's key bridges and railway station, retreated and concentrated their forces downtown.

The encroaching contingents crossed Colgante Bridge from the east, then tying a police officer named "Gabat", who was left behind by the Japanese to guard the bridge, to a utility pole near the episcopal palace's perimeter fence on corners Calle Via Gainza and Calle Santonja. Afterwards, the guerillas asked the Pagdatoon household behind the Colegio de Sta. Isabel compound for leftover rice and other foodstuff before proceeding into combat. Their initial attack was heralded by a guerilla's improvised coconut bomb exploding in the northern portion of Naga.

They proceeded southward down Via Gainza and towards the Naga Provincial Capitol and Jail, Guerillas lobbed dynamites, homemade grenades, and all explosives available onto the sentry barricades just outside the jail. The Japanese rushed to lock all the cells on both inner and outer gates, then positioning themselves onto the prison’s parapets and semi-pill-boxed compartments to man the machine gun emplacements. An elderly African-American man who slept in the jail’s provision room outside the wall served the guerillas coffee and corned beef.

While the battle grew in intensity, an adamant unit of Japanese soldiers sought Villafuerte and his family. Villafuerte initially wanted to seek refuge in the Episcopal Palace, but the Japanese persisted with the Capitol. Villafuerte's Oldsmobile, containing Villafuerte's children, and the Japanese truck, despite under close fire, managed to enter the Capitol. The people inside throughout the besiegement were "their children Jose, Mariano Jr., Fe., Pura Luisa, Luis, Carmen and Lina; Tilay's [caretaker]; Leopoldo Servidad, Villafuerte's bodyguard; Crispin de los Santos, family driver; Mayor Crescini; and 6 to 7 IJA soldiers led by Suga."

The Tangcong Vaca Guerilla Unit arrived in the late afternoon, deploying from Milaor and Tabuco. The Japanese emplacements at the Abella residence by the Puente de Naga on Panganiban Avenue, the Naga Public Market by the Tabuco Bridge, and Plaza Quince Martires were overrun by guerillas. Meanwhile, the Agta bowmen equipped with fire bows under Isabelo Payte had torched the entire south of the town. A fleeing family even witnessed a woman beating the charred corpse of a Japanese personnel in a burning bodega in Tabuco. The remaining elements of these defenses were either wiped out or had resorted to the Capitol and the entrenchments in Plaza Rizal. Throughout the night, the 99.6% lunar illumination meant that many civilians were spectating the battle.

===== Second day (2 May 1942) =====
On the early morning of the 2nd at 3:00 AM, the battle had lulled down considerably. The guerillas took this opportunity to slip behind the walls and implant explosive charges on the northern wall. Within hearing distance, internees near the charges were instructed by the guerillas to stay away from the front of their cells. In the following hour, praise and applause could be heard throughout the jail while the sledge-hammer-wielding guerillas were freeing internees from their cells. The remaining Japanese resistance were simply relegated to mopping up duties.

The prisoners, mainly American mining engineers stationed in Camarines Norte and Masbate and other foreign nationals, were led to the residence of former Gov. Andres Hernandez (now Grand Square Imperial) on corners Calle P. Burgos and Calle Igualdad, the temporary base of operations of the guerillas. They were then organized to be reunited with their spouses and children at the Manley residence, numbering 42 in total.

Guerilla units emerged from neighboring barrios and joined arms with the Camp Isarogs, especially the numerically superior Tangcong Vaca. Capt. Damaso Dianela's Camp Tinawagan reinforced the CIG with 65 more men. Ricardo Gordenker, from Carolina; Jose Hernandez, from Cabusao; Buenaventura Plantado with the Bimeda brothers and Lt. Ernesto Cayetano as his officers; and Felix Espiritu, from Camaligan, led separate units into the capital.

The CIG, now reinforced with manpower from exterior outfits, made an assault on the radio and artillery installment of the Juanabel Building by Plaza Rizal. With a dispatch headed by Padua, they cleared the light artillery detachment in the Juanabel Building. A radio broadcast was aired by guerrilla engineers to announce the state of Naga. Another building called the Flordeliza building beside the Provincial Jail was cleared of Japanese emplacements. Around this time, the Capitol district, especially in the vicinity of Plaza Rizal, had many littered corpses of Japanese soldiers. At 3:00 p.m, some surrendered Japanese were captured, notably a Japanese soldier named Sonada wearing wounds of bolo slashes on his back, along with a rope hogtied around his neck. He had garnered an infamous reputation in Partido for his brutality and abuses on the local population. Kicking him homebound to CIG's camp in Upper Partido, he was scheduled to be executed on the night of the 2nd.

Additionally, Gordenker, Hernandes, and Espiritu’s elements banded together on a mass torching campaign upon the many shanties around the Capitol to deny the Japanese of any cover. At around 5:00 p.m, a fire spread over to the nearby commercial district. Two notable buildings caught by the uncontrollable flame was Kubota’s residence, the President of the Japanese Association in Camarines Sur, and the Aguinaldo Department Store branch in Naga beside the Capitol.

===== Third day (3 May 1942) =====
After living off of a cooked mongrel the night before, the hungry and despondent occupants of the Capitol escaped in a three-vehicle convoy in the dark before dawn. The first Japanese truck, armored with concrete and a machine gun mount, held Peping, Crescini, Servidad, Suga, and some soldiers. The second truck, with a machine gun mounted, carried the rest of the soldiers, whereas the Oldsmobile held Ms. Villafuerte, her six other children, the driver, and the yaya. Under the cover of machine gun fire, they made their way through Calle Elias Angeles bound for Calabanga.

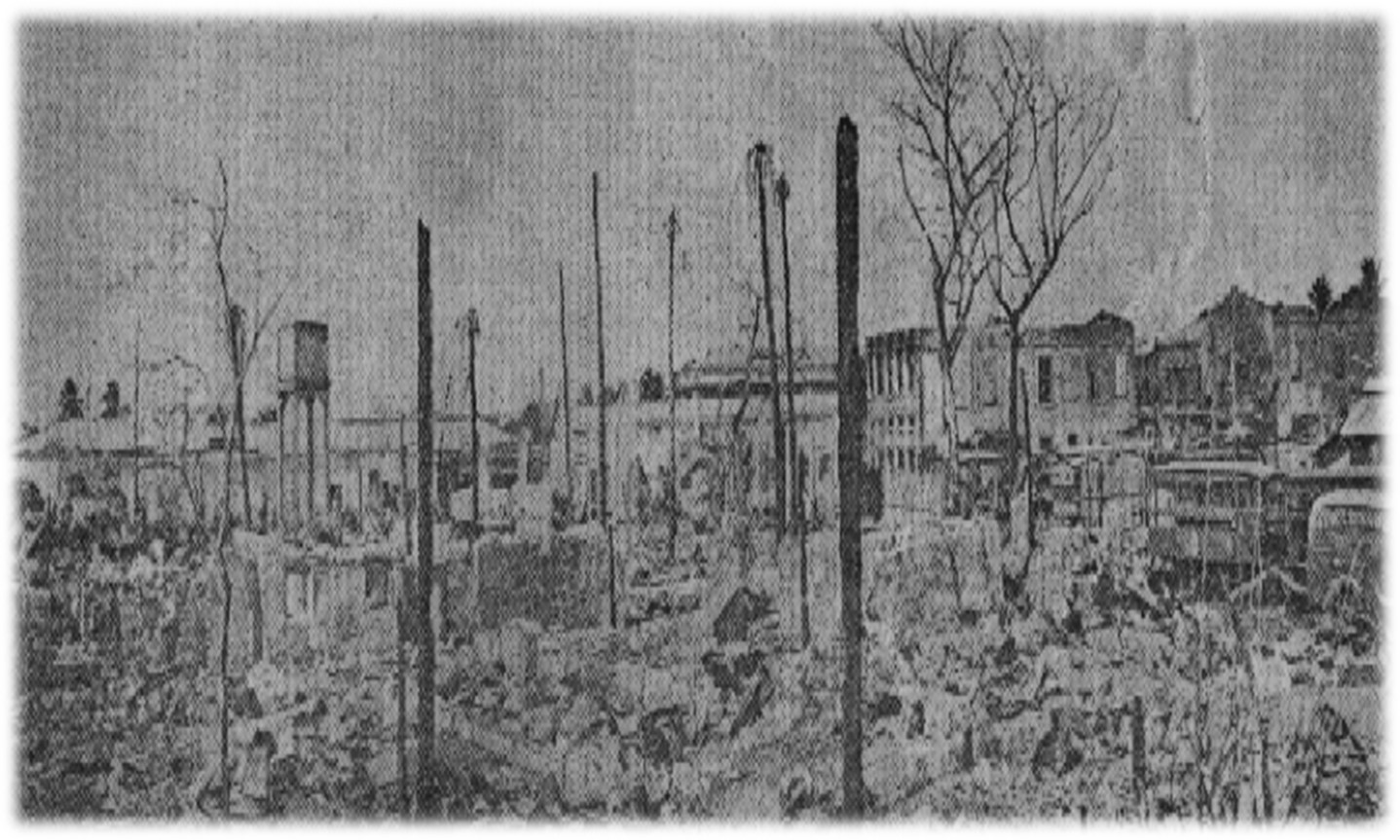
Bombed out rubble of a building in present-day J. Hernandez Ave. in Naga during the retaliatory aerial bombings of the Japanese in mid-May 1942.

===== Aftermath (May 1942) =====
As daylight emerged, a large victory parade of civilians and guerillas wound the downtown area. Those suspected of collaborating were rounded up and tried under a military court in Tigaon, the Camp Isarog’s guerilla headquarters. Most of the convicts were civically renowned lawyers from nearby municipalities. On the account of their treachery, they were subsequently executed by beheading.

A few days after the guerilla victory, about an 8,000 strong Japanese force backed by tanks, cavalry, and planes dispatched by Governor-General Masaharu Homma from Manila disembarked at Pasacao Harbour on May 5, sent to retake Naga. Guerilla forces scurried back to their remote barrios without much resistance and returned to their mountain camps to steer clear of the Japanese. Since then, the guerillas concentrated their efforts in "sporadic ambush of small-sized enemy patrols in the countryside and in intelligence and counter-intelligence activities."

On 7 July 1942, the Japanese invited the municipal council to attend to a conference. During this conference, the municipal officers were virtually held as prisoners for a week. The Japanese blamed the municipal council for their "dereliction of duties", the overall "unenthusiastic welcome...received from the residents of Naga," and the burning of the town's business district. The council argued that there was a way to coerce the residents into loyalty since they were also virtually stripped of authority to do anything. They also pushed back against their alleged complicity in the conflagration of Tabuco, remarking that their own residences were engulfed in the fire. Having convinced the Japanese of their non-complicity, they were released.

==== Allied bombings (1944-1945) ====
As early as 15 October 1944, Naga, Sipocot, and the other towns of Bikol became the targets of American bombing. Two days later, Pili was bombed. This became the breaking point of the Japanese, indirectly causing the Agdangan Massacre in Baao. Guerillas during this time received constant Allied supply drops from American transport aircraft and guerilla submarines in Libmanan, Minalabac, and Pasacao. This was made via the newly-established communication between guerilla radio elements (Radio City) and the American-occupied Tacloban, Leyte. In mid-December, the Marine Aircraft Group 12 (MAG-12) joined up with fighter groups 348 and 475, along with two Douglas A-20 Havoc and North American B-25 Mitchell groups, of the United States Army Air Forces (USAAF) stationed in Tacloban, to launch almost daily air raids over Naga and the entirety of Bikol. In particular, these American bombers used white phosphorus incendiaries.

Allied air raids also led to dogfights over Naga. On one occasion from October to December, two American fighters managed to down a Japanese plane. But, on another occasion, an American Curtiss P-40 Warhawk was struck; after an hour, the Japanese came to Naga with a huge poster saying "that attacking American war planes had been destroyed." Another occurrence of an Allied downing was an American single-seat fighter forced down in Milaor. It was displayed almost intact at the Naga Central School by the Japanese where Filipinos eventually stripped it bare.

On 31 December 1944, six United States Naval Aviation (USNA) planes, which were part of a much larger flight group, strafed the Naga and Pamplona railroad stations. In Naga, carloads of dynamite and ordinances were ignited by tracer fire. Detonated artillery and mortar shells, along with drums of gasoline in successive explosions, destroyed half a kilometer-long stretch of rail. During the raid, anti-aircraft machine gun emplacements from the station managed to down a plane which crashed in Calabanga.

On 21 March 1945 at around 9:00 AM, a group of B-25s and Consolidated B-24 Liberators dropped white phosphorus over Naga, with additional .50 caliber providing extra fire on the ground. Roughly 300 Filipinos died in this bombing, especially those at the public market. Due to dire hyperinflation, the Japanese promised that foodstuff would be distributed at the public market. The Japanese sustained little to no casualties because of the bomb shelters strewn across the town, especially those on the four corners of Plaza Rizal. The heavy Allied firebombing levelled most of Naga's infrastructure, with only the cathedral; Capitol; Seminary; Peñafrancia Shrine; and the Japanese-requisitioned strongholds, such as Col. Kobayashi's quarters in Bagumbayan, the Abella residence on corners Calle Blumentritt and Calle Panganiban, and the Almeda residence on Calle Abella, being left unscathed. This elicited the Japanese garrisons to resort to a more defensive posture.

Following the bombing, the Japanese blew up an ammunition depot at the Tabuco wharf, causing a large explosion which sound reached Pamplona. The following night, the Mabolo Bridge's two spans were demolished. On the eastern foot of Colgante Bridge, 30 Japanese soldiers were sandbagged in a dugout. On corners Calle Dayangdang and Colgante Bridge, a machine gun emplacement was placed near a utility pole.

==== Preparations for the liberation of Naga (March–April 1945) ====
On the early morning of 28 March 1945, 103 TVGU forces, led by Maj. Miranda, Lts. Peñaredondo, Osio, Bimeda, and Sabaria, along with Allied Intelligence Bureau (AIB) officer Lt. Rhys Wood, ambushed a Japanese element boat crossing the Mabolo River into Naga from the Qua Chee Gan warehouse in Mabolo. When the Japanese reached the middle of the river, the guerrillas opened fire on their boats from the opposite bank. They either sank, drowned, or were picked off individually by guerrilla gunfire. The guerrillas returned to Dahilig, Gainza for a quick breakfast, then returned to the ambush site toward the Mabolo railroad bridge. Japanese reinforcements retaliated with heavy machine gun and rifle fire, prompting the guerrillas to flee. On the third day after the skirmish, with the water filled with Japanese corpses, civilians were dissuaded from sailing through the river.

On 5 April, AIB officer Maj. Russel Barros, in a meeting at Pamukid Central School, San Fernando, organized a local taskforce to liberate Naga. Maj. Miranda of the TVGU was voted as its overall commander. Those invited were Capt. Mamerto Sibulo, Lt. Honorato Osio, Lt. Nicolas Penaredondo, and the rest of the TVGU; Camp Isarog "II" under Maj. Padua and his staff; the Blue Eagle Malunggay Regiment under Maj. Jesus Villaseñor and his staff; and the Philippine Army Air Corps, the cover name of the AIB operating in Camarines Sur, under Capt. Nicolas Carbonell and his staff.

On 7 April, a meeting was held at the Camaligan Central School (CCS) to discuss ways on how to disarm Cristobal Bonnevie's notorious 2nd Battalion from the attack; this was mainly pushed by Barros due to their criminal-like behavior. Miranda managed to devise a plan which was to take place on the following day. A medical examination at the same school required all of the TVGU's men, which all succeeded per the three battalions from 3rd to the deliberately placed 2nd, to disarm and strip themselves, along with filling up an information sheet, outside Barros' office then proceed to Dr. Gomez's room for the medical check-up. Once it was the 2nd Battalion's turn, Lt. Osio's men, disguised as mess officers from the Home Economics building, rushed to Barros' office and confiscated their weaponry. Afterwards, Lt. Felix Espiritu and his Philippine Scouts sealed the building where the battalion was off. Once informed by Miranda of their disarmament, a few select officers, such as Lt. Pedro Malonda, grew inconsolable. However, some units within the battalion such as the likes of Malonda's were integrated into the other elements after pressing Barros.

From Camaligan Mayor Andres Diez's residence, Miranda and the ring of officers officially ratified the decision to attack Naga in the early morning, along with the finalized joint task force composed of the following:

"a Lightning Company from Camp Isarog under Lt. Lorenzo Padua; one platoon from the Blue Eagle Unit, commanded by Lt. Balbino Gamboa, and with Lts. Marcelo Baneoso, Delfin Badiola, Martin Bigay and Marcelo Bigay; a platoon of the 7th [Allied Intelligence Bureau Philippine Army Air Corps] (AIBPAAC) under Lt. Delfin Rosales; a company of Philippine Scouts (under the Kalayaan Command) led by Capt. Domingo Encinas; and three Tangcong Vaca companies, namely the 1st Combat Company under Lt. Honorato Osio, the 2nd Combat Company under Lt. Nicolas Penaredondo; and the 3rd Combat Company led by Lt. Mamerto Sibulo."

— Jose V. Barrameda Jr., In the Crucible of an Asymmetrical War in Camarines Sur 1942-1945: The Story of the Tangcong Vaca Guerilla Unit, 182-183

Miranda's staff consisted of Lt. Wood as assistant Commanding Officer, Lt. Mariano Aureus as intelligence office, Lt. Ernesto Cayetano as finance officer, Lt. Angel Huertas as supply officer, Barros as adviser, and Villaseñor as his deputy.

==== Liberation of Naga (9–13 April 1945) ====
The composite force, originally an underequipped force in the previous battle for Naga, now had access to an array of American and Japanese service firearms, including automatic and semi-automatic rifles.

===== First day (9 April 1945) =====
On 9 April from 4:00 AM to 5:00 AM, the 9th Lightning Company (LC) and the 2nd Combat Company (CC), via Tacolod, Canaman and Queborac, struck the back of Ateneo de Naga with a few rounds. The Japanese element, caught by surprise, abandoned the campus and withdrew through Sta. Cruz to regroup with the rest of the garrison defending the Provincial Capitol. The 9th LC and the 2nd CC spent an hour scouring the campus, to which they found some ammunition and most notably a Japanese .50 caliber Type 1 heavy machine gun. The 9th LC and the 2nd CC then proceeded to the main battle southward via Calles Pedro Abad and Igualdad.

At the same time, the 1st CC, 3rd CC, and the 7th AIBPAAC via Calle Abella had besieged the Provincial Capitol, the bomb shelters at Plaza Rizal, and the banana-trunk-covered machine gun emplacement near the Public Schools Division Office (present-day Plaza Quezon). The Japanese, estimated to have been at a company-level strength, fought ferociously for 8 hours.

At lunchtime, ALATCO buses transferred guerillas to and fro Camaligan and Naga, substantially quelling the momentum of the battle. These buses kept a constant flow of ammunition and replacements. Across Gainza and Camaligan, the Anciano family and the many households prepared and contributed foodstuffs for the guerillas.

During this opportune period, the Japanese garrison with its many casualties in the Capitol district, while engaging the interim force in intermittent firefights, retreated to the stone-concrete Abella residence across the Naga River through Calle Panganiban. During this firefight, Lt. Teofilo Padua called on his Agta bowmen yet their arrows fell short over the river. The skirmish at the Puente de Naga cost the life of 22-year-old Lt. Delfin Rosales who reportedly tried to retrieve Catimbang, a wounded guerilla, close to him on the bridge. After recapturing the abandoned Capitol, morale among the belligerent guerillas grew, as well as the raising of both the Philippine and American flags in jubilance. Despite running low on ammunition, battered elements took turns between replenishments from Camaligan in pinning the Japanese down at the Abella residence. The Philippine Scouts from Pasacao, who had been sent to disarm another guerilla group, had arrived in the afternoon.

In the evening, another conference was held at Mayor Diez's residence to reevaluate their overall strategy. Under the cover of darkness, Miranda sent a scout squad to verify the status of the Japanese defenses at the Manley residence, the Kempeitai headquarters.

===== Second day (10 April 1945) =====
On 10 April at around 6:00 AM, the composite force mounted another assault on the Abella residence. At the exact same time, the 2nd and 3rd CCs proceeded via Calle Via Gainza in an attempt to engage and sever the Japanese reinforcements from the Manley residence and across the river in Tinago and Dayangdang to the Abella defense line. The 2nd CC held Calle Via Gainza from the length of the San Francisco Church until Calle Santonja, whereas the 3rd CC held positions at the Cathedral.

At around 8:00 AM, Miranda ordered the Philippine Scouts to attack from the south via Tabuco and Balintawak in an enveloping movement to constrain the Japanese-held bridge's rear. However, the vantage height from the Abella enabled the garrison to hold off and eventually pin down the guerilla salient.

On the afternoon of the 10th, the composite force had temporarily withheld their men and their nearly depleted ammunition in hopes of replenishment. Lt. Osio and his 1st CC, with help from civilian intelligence, managed to cross the Naga River through a narrow creek in San Felipe, enabling them to outflank the Japanese with a salient element on their rear. However, at 4:30 PM, as guerillas were charging to the outskirts of the defenses, Lt. Osio was shot in his right thigh and was hurried to Pacol at Dr. Magno Jamito's residence. Around this point, the only guerilla elements engaged against the Japanese were the TVGU's combat companies. For 10 hours from early in the afternoon to late in the evening, the 2nd and 3rd CCs fought in gruelling urban-riverine combat against the Japanese in the Tinago-Dayangdang district.

In the evening, the Japanese had abandoned their positions altogether at the Abella residence and rebolstered their Tinago-Dayangdang, Colgante Bridge, and Manley defenses. The Tinago-Dayangdang defenses already included comprehensive dugouts amid a flat rice field with a preferential line of fire for the Japanese from both flanks and the rear. It is a possibility that the Japanese intended to hold on to Naga for much longer "in anticipation of forthcoming reinforcements." By 11 PM, the 2nd and 3rd CCs, along with Lt. Sibulo's Agta bowmen from Ragay firing flame arrows across the river, began overrunning Japanese positions at Tinago-Dayangdang and thus gaining ground in this regard. Once Lt. Peñaredondo realized that Lt. Osio's 1st CC, engaging the rear of the Tinago-Dayangdang defenses and foxholes, was in their line of fire, he "ordered his men to cease fire and hug cover." The sudden cessation of arms meant that the Japanese were able to retreat to Concepcion Grande.

===== Third day (11 April 1945) =====
The guerillas engaged the Japanese at the Concepcion Grande Cemetery where "they put up a brief [and] stiff resistance." Both sides fought in close-quarters combat among the hastily dug foxholes and the cemetery's tombstones. The Japanese also retreated to the fortifications of Diaz's Hardware, a military checkpoint on the road between Pili and Naga.

===== Fourth day (12 April 1945) =====
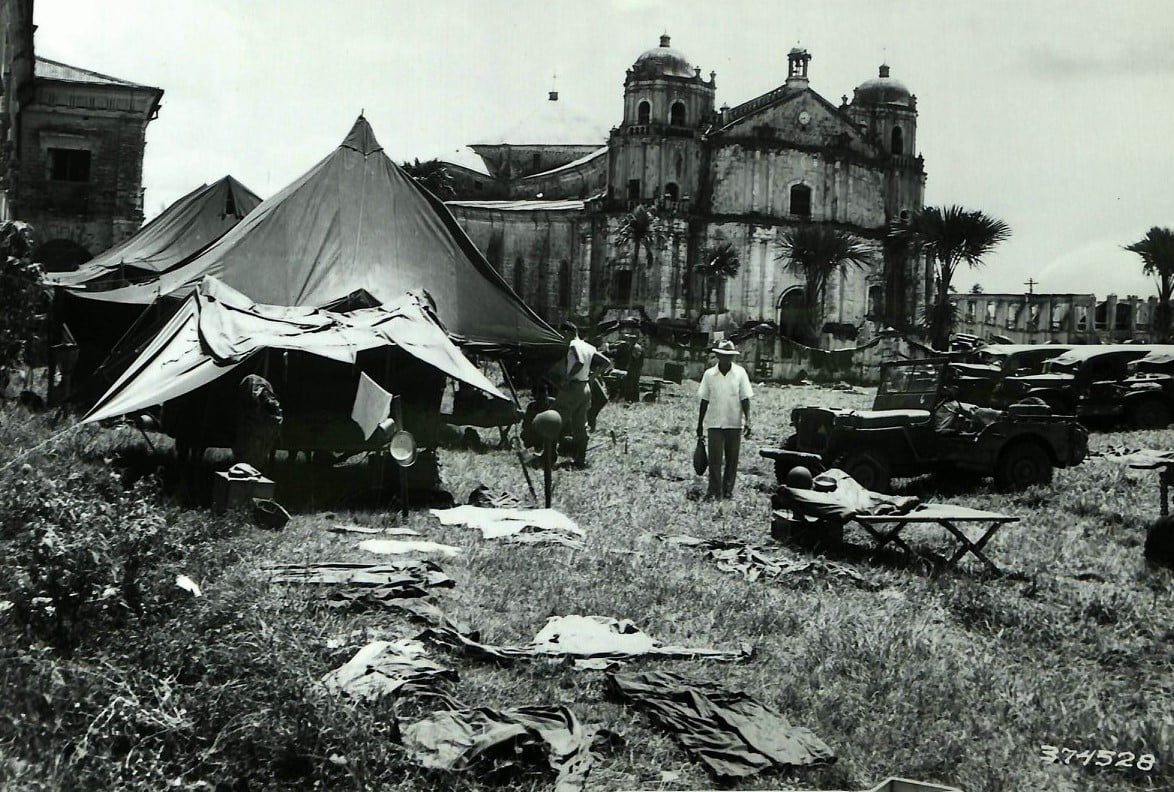
Temporary 5th Cavalry Regiment encampment at the Naga Metropolitan Cathedral on April 15, 1945.

On the next day of the 12th, the Japanese holed up at Diaz's Hardware were forced to retreat to Palestina and Cadlan after .50 caliber machine gun fire started tearing through their defenses. Some straggling Japanese units managed to inflict some casualities in the outskirts of Naga; Pvt. Severiano Valenzuela and Pvt. Gavino Aldin, both constituting a guerilla patrol, were both wounded in an ambush down on the railroad tracks at Pili. They were evacuated via hand cart to Naga station and then to Mayor Simeon Barrameda's house in Magarao, virtually turned into a guerilla hospital.

===== Victory day (13 April 1945) =====
On April 13, 1945, Naga was officially liberated from Japanese occupation. At 9:00 AM, the guerilla liberation was celebrated through a downtown victory parade.

=== Rapid postwar recovery (1945-1948) ===
After Naga was liberated from the Japanese, Naga began rebuilding. Having suffered only a few casualties, Naga was able to rebuild quickly after the war.

A good percentage of Naga's infrastructure were destroyed by the bombings. Major roads into and outside Naga were left into substantial ruin. During the war, the Hispanic-era Bishop's Palace was engulfed in uncontrollable flames during the Fifth Air Force's firebombing in 1945. In 1946, the present Episcopal Palace modelled in a contemporary post-war style was the resolution arrived by the Municipal Council. The domestic elites residing on the blocks of Elias Angeles, Gen. Luna, and Mabini also had their homes destroyed during the Allied bombings.

==== Re-organization of public bureaucracy and administration (1946) ====
On 14 May 1945, a month after the cessation of hostilities in Naga notwithstanding the Isarog district, the Philippine Civil Affairs Unit (PCAU) attached to the occupying Eighth Army re-established the transitional Municipal Council in Naga, installing Municipal Mayor Rosalio Imperial as the presider of the council, with his second-in-command Vice Mayor Blas R. David.

Imperial commenced the multi-faceted rebuilding of Naga's civic life and welfare, economy, leisure, and infrastructure directly post-war, stepping down in March 1946 to relegate the mayor position to his successor David. With David as mayor, Domingo A. Escalante was elevated to vice-mayor albeit in a short period of time, then subsequently being replaced by Raymundo O. Martinez in June.

This governmental flexibility was not without its issues however; the provincial capitol was heavily damaged during the American bombings, with only one section of the edifice viable for administrative purposes. Without any other feasible sailent to relocate the provincial head, the Municipal Council was shoehorned into this small part of the building before further renovations allowed for proper facilities.

==== Restoration of Naga's public utilities, commerce, and industry (1946) ====
In early 1946, the immediate restoration of Camarines Sur's power grid by the Manila Electric Company (Meralco) sped up reconstruction efforts. By late 1946, Meralco announced its intent to decentralize the grid to the businessmen of Naga by privatizing its sector in Camarines Sur as a local firm. Many domestic magnates proposed amounts reaching ₱270,000 (tens of millions of pesos by 2025 standards), but the acquisition was ultimately handed over to former Secretary of Energy Jaime Hernandez, renaming it "Bicol Electric Company" (BEC). The BEC provided electricity on a 24-hour basis to Naga. Plumbing utilities, provided by the local branch of the National Waterworks and Sewerage Authority (NAWASA), operated similarly except for compulsory nighttime shutdowns.

With the restoration of basic public utilities during the swift period of 1946, the resumption of civic life of Naga after the war was already characterized by the resuscitation of its industrial and commercial economy. By 1946, the lumber and hardware trade surged in lucrativity; new and pre-war parlors and restaurants numbering eight re-opened to the public; and hospitals with electric equipment were able to operate uninterrupted. Recreational establishments flourished with the temporary encampment of the 158th Regimental Combat Team "Bushmasters" on the slopes of Barrio San Felipe: these included theatres such as Alex and Bichara Theatres, Cine Citas; nightclubs such as Dreamland Cabaret owned by Adelino Madrid near the 158th RCT's base; the Plaza Bowling Alley just south of Plaza Rizal, as well as many other establishments reliant on electricity.

A map from the US Army Corps of Engineers' Army Map Service depicting the streets of Naga in 1944.

In 1946, the re-establishment of transportation and communication lines were top priority in the provincial capitol. With the reconstruction of the general road network and the post-war repair of the once guerilla-infested Main Line South railway, the Albert Louis Ammen Transportation Company (Alatco) and the Manila Railroad Co. (MRR) were allowed to continue operations to and from Naga by 1946 to 1947. On 2 November 1946, Far Eastern Transport Inc. (FEATI), which was to be integrated into the Philippine Airlines franchise a year after, christened its Douglas DC-3 airliner, serialized as PI-C39, with the title "City of Naga" at Naga Airport, serving as FEATI's inaugural flight to Naga.

==== Postwar educational boom (1946-1948) ====
The 1946 Peñafrancia Parade reinstated the compulsory participation of schools such as Ateneo de Naga, Colegio de Sta. Isabel, Camarines Sur High School, and Camarines Sur Trade School in civic and co-curricular activities directly post-war. This encapsulated a region-wide educational demand, with primary to collegiate level students all across the Bicol Region flocking to Naga's academic opportunities.

From 1946 to 1947, most of Naga's modern-day colleges started emerging by-and-large with dense student enrollment rates, as evidenced by a couple of former primary and secondary institutions expanding to the collegiate level. In 1946, from being an exclusively all-girl's normal school, Colegio de Sta. Isabel finally opened its College of Education and College of Liberal Arts. On 3 March 1947, Dr. Melchor Villanueva founded Naga Teacher's College at a certain Villafrancia's mansion by Peñafrancia Ave, offering a 2-year Junior Normal Curriculum to 114 enrollees in the first year alone. Then, on 5 June, a men's college in Ateneo de Naga opened with 87 students. On 1 July, Dr. Jaime Hernandez opened the Nueva Caceres Colleges "with initial courses in Liberal Arts, Commerce, Education" and 958 students in the High School Department. On the exact same day, Bishop of Caceres, Most Rev. Pedro P. Santos, DD., opened Naga Parochial School, the first all-boys parochial elementary institution in Naga.

Vocational and technical courses also arose during this period, with new academic institutions of the Southern Luzon College, Garcia Business Institute, Elegant Fashion Academy, etc., funded privately by the caste of the town's intellectuals.

=== Chartered cityhood (1948) ===
==== Background ====
Before the introduction of Naga's cityhood in Congress, many attempts to stir popular support were made by the Municipal Council. In early 1948, Patricio Amanse, a Naga lawyer, wrote an article for the Bicol Star detailing how the city's revenue would double without tax increases through the elevation to chartered cityhood status, inviting substantial lobby support from many of the city's commercial demographics.

==== Ratification and inauguration of cityhood ====
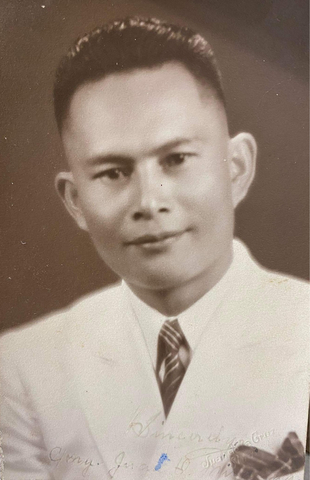
A portrait of Juan Q. Miranda c. 1947

Juan Q. Miranda, famed guerilla leader of the Tangcong Vaca Guerilla Unit during World War II, served as Camarines Sur's 1st Congressional District Representative from 1946 to 1949; Miranda was the most influential proponent of Naga's cityhood and its subsequent charter. He was the main author of House Bill No. 1255, titled "An Act Creating the City of Naga," passed into Congress as Republic Act No. 305.

On 18 June 1948, Representatives Juan Q. Miranda, Tomas Clemente, Toribio Perez, and Senator Vicente Madrigal of the 1st Congress, along with Secretary of Agriculture and Natural Resources Mariano Garchitorena witnessed the signing of RA 305, otherwise known as the "Charter of the City of Naga" by then-President Elpidio Quirino. On 15 December, six months after the promulgation of RA 305, Naga was officially inaugurated as a city with famed guerilla leader Leon SA. Aureus as its first ever City Mayor.

=== Naga in the 1950s ===
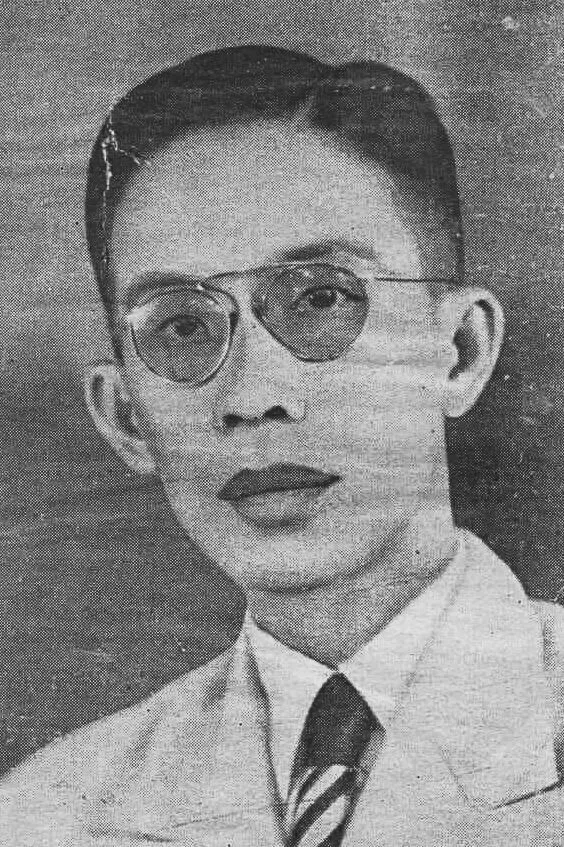
A portrait of the first City Mayor of Naga, Leon SA. Aureus.

==== Mayors during the 1950s ====
During the 1950s, the mayoral makeup of the city shifted often considering Naga was still pegged on bureaucratic appointment from the President. From 1948 to August 1953, Leon SA. Aureus presided over the City Council of Naga; around 1953, charges from supposed "irregularities" were filed against Aureus to his detriment for "(1) violation of civil service law and regulations, (2) maintaining a gambling joint and (3) grave dereliction of official duty," quoted from his presidential exoneration. Below is one of the prosecutor's "unfounded" claims against Aureus:

"(b) The charge of nepotism for employing close relatives as janitor in his office and as attendant in the social welfare home is likewise unfounded as the record discloses that their appointments were immediately brought by him to the attention of the proper authorities in Manila, thereby showing respondent’s good faith. Upon instruction of said authorities his appointees were separated from the service."

— (Sgd.) Elpidio Qurino, Acting President & (Sgd.) Marciano Roque, Acting Executive Secretary, EXONERATING MR. LEON SA. AUREUS AS MAYOR OF NAGA CITY, [Administrative Order. 218, 6 October 1953]

On 6 October 1953, Aureus was awarded a presidential pardon by then-President Elpidio Quirino but Aureus had already resigned by then, appointing Anastacio M. Prila as his successor. He served a short tenure from September to January of the following year, subsequently appointing Antonio P. Sibulo who likewise held the position from January to May 1954. After Sibulo, Monico Imperial was inaugurated with a permanent mayorship in June 1954 until 31 August 1959, the longest mayoral term in Naga thus far spanning 6 years.

==== Imperial's public facilities and infrastructure ====
From 16 to 23 October 1952, Naga and the rest of Southern Luzon was hit by the deadly Typhoon Trix. This substantially influenced public policy, reflecting the succeeding Imperial administration's shift towards infrastructure.

In stark contrast to other provincial capitals across Luzon reeling from the Hukbalahap rebellion, Imperial's administration managed to spearhead the immediate enhancement of the city's public facilities and infrastructure. He led the completion of road-widening efforts across the city, along with the increased automobile ownership in the 1950s requiring all of the main arteries to be refitted with concrete asphalt. About ₱54,528 were spent maintaining and repairing the roads into and out of Naga.

Naga's idle districts during Imperial's term were all converted to facilitate the creation of subdivisions and dissuade the propagation of localized shanty towns. During the immediate post-reconstruction period, where endemic rural flight into fledgling urban areas fuelled slums nationwide, Imperial implemented many hallmark legislation in the City Council to actively counteract against the urban phenomenon, such as the Tree Farm Lease Agreement where occupants, especially in Panicuason, were permitted a renewable 25-year lease on squatted property provided they planted and maintained plant fruit bearing trees on it. As implied from certain civic records, Imperial's administration during the 1950s was able to largely contain urban congestion and slums.

Imperial also oversaw the inception of the present-day City Hall which was then located in the City Heights Subdivision in Barrio Dayangdang, having the structure's construction span his mayoral term from 1954 to 1959. The overall design of the City Hall was drafted in 1957 by veteran architect Carlos Florenda of the United Architects of the Philippines Camarines Sur Chapter. Eventually, the City Hall was completed in 1959.

Another such project during Imperial's term was the construction of the Peñafrancia Bridge, allocating a total of ₱150,000.

==== Elevation of Diocese of Cáceres to archdiocese status (1951) ====
Two months before the annual Our Lady of Peñafrancia festival that usually occurs in Naga, on 29 June 1951, Pope Pius XII ordained the elevation of the Diocese of Cáceres by virtue of the Papal Bull Quo in Philippina Republica to the Archdiocese of Cáceres. The document also outlined the creation of two new suffragan dioceses: Diocese of Sorsogon, with civil provinces Sorsogon and Masbate; Diocese of Legazpi, with civil provinces Legazpi and Catanduanes. In the interim, both Camarines Sur and Norte remained under the jurisdiction of the greater Ecclesiastical Province of Cáceres.

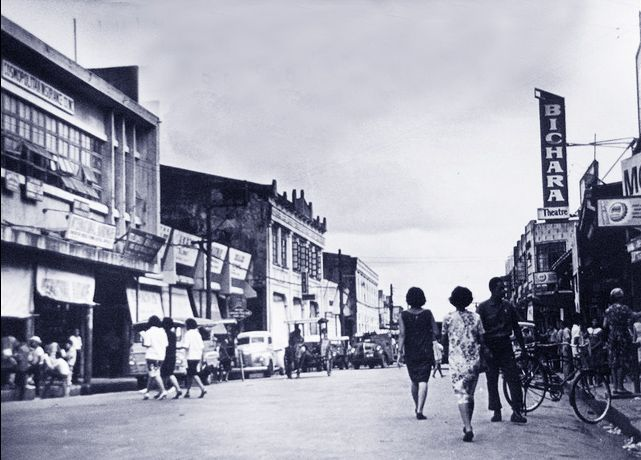
Naga, Gen. Luna St. c. 1952

==== Transfership of provincial capitol (1955) ====
Enshrined in the Charter of the City of Naga (RA 305) indicated itself a self-determinant municipality, separating de facto with the provincial jurisdiction of Camarines Sur. Between 1948 and 1955, especially with the construction of a new city hall in Naga away from the Capitol, Gov. Juan F. Trivio initiated the transfer of the provincial head from Naga to Pili. This was subsequently passed in Congress on 16 June 1955, with the official provincial capitol serving as the provincial seat of Camarines Sur in Naga being transferred to Barrio Palestina in Pili by virtue of Republic Act No. 1336.

==== End of the 1950s ====
According to the city's development index:

"The existence of the University of Nueva Caceres as the only university in Luzon island outside of Manla and Quezon City. It had two modern bottling plants operated by the San Miguel Brewery, Inc. and the Seven-Up Bottling Company. The number of theaters had increased considerably from three in 1946 to seven, aside from its only radio station, the DZRB. It had eighteen drug stores, eighteen bakeries, twelve hotels and lodging houses, fifteen restaurants, thirteen beauty parlors, numerous bazars, six hospitals and clinics, and five city-owned spacious market pavilions. There were five local weeklies. It had four banks which took care of the financing of the various agricultural, commercial and industrial transactions in the city. These were the Rehabilitation Finance Corporation branch, the Philippine National Bank branch, the Camarines Sur Philippine National Bank Agency and the Republic Savings Bank."

— Gerona, Danilo Madrid, Naga: The Birth and Rebirth of a City

From 28 December to 2 January 1959, just as Imperial was turning over the city in preparation for the first mayoral elections, Naga and the rest of Southern Luzon was inflicted heavily by Typhoon Harriet, killing 5 individuals and leaving approximately 12,000 without a home.

=== Naga in the 1960s ===
==== First mayoral elections ====
After years of presidential appointments, the first mayoral elections in Naga were held in 1959 among its residents. In 1959, Victorino L. Ojeda, a member of the Nacionalista Party, won the mayoral seat against Ramon H. Felipe Jr., with Mariano R. Villafuerte Jr. as his vice-mayor. Ojeda did not run for another term and instead became a high-ranking member of the Board of Directors of the Bicol Development Company (BIDECO) by the late 1960s. From January 1960 to December 1963, Ojeda and Felipe, along with the 4th Municipal Board, fulfilled their first elected 3-year term.

In the 1963 local elections, Liberal Party candidates Ramon H. Felipe Jr. and Vicente P. Sibulo won the mayorship and vice mayorship respectively. Sibulo originally intended to run as the Nacionalista candidate, but certain Naga-based civic groups, such as the Lions Club and Jaycees, convinced him to let Felipe be elected as Mayor. The executives and the 5th Municipal Board were formally inaugurated in January of 1964. Then, on September the following year, Felipe stepped down as Mayor for a congressional seat, thus placing Sibulo as Naga's acting Mayor for the rest of the decade and the eventual Martial Law from 1972 to 1980.

==== Naga under Ojeda (1960-1963) ====
By 1962, agricultural and retail merchandising, and real estate via subdivisions were the most popular forms of industry in the city, with about 91,100 hectares of arable land in the scheme of cropping. Based on a description given by Eugenio Kilates, the former principal of Naga Central School in the early 1960s, a growing commodity market from small scale home industries could be observed in the city, such as "patis making, poultry food manufacture, rice noodle making, household appliances manufacturing, the making of hollow blocks and concrete pipes, iron grill work, door and sash of wood and shells."

==== Naga under Felipe and Sibulo (1964-1972) ====
===== Urban growth in the 1960s =====
Under Felipe's short term, he started the initial pre-planning and construction of soon-to-be Naga City "Supermarket" Public Market in 1964 on a historical 1.5 hectare lot in Tabuco. In total, ₱4,600,000 was allocated for its budget. In 1969, as Sibulo took in the reigns as City Mayor, the Naga City "Supermarket" Public Market was finally complete and was opened to the public on the same year. The Supermarket undeniably boosted Naga's international image as being the only urban area in all of Southeast Asia to have an edifice of such scale.

In 1966, the 7-storeyed Philippine National Bank building on Gen. Luna St. was opened to the public, becoming the Bicol Region's first mid-rise complex.

On 17 February 1968, Naga inaugurated its first-ever ABS-CBN radio station, DZRB, located in the now-defunct ABS CBN TV Station in Concepion Pequeña.

=== 21st Century ===
==== Elevation to a Highly Urbanized City ====
Mayor Leni Robredo speaking on the result of the HUC conversion plebiscite on November 21, 2026

Efforts to convert Naga into a highly urbanized city (HUC) began in 2026 under mayor Leni Robredo's term. The city council passed Resolution No. 2026–078 on 27 January urging President Bongbong Marcos to declare Naga a HUC owing to the city achieving the required population and income thresholds. Robredo announced on 27 May 2026, on the 68th birth anniversary of Jesse Robredo, her late husband and long-time mayor of Naga, that Marcos signed a proclamation granting Naga's new status. A plebiscite was conducted by the Commission on Elections on November 21, 2026. Out of 119,259 Naga's electorate, 37,247 cast their ballots, yielding 30,538 "Yes" votes (roughly 82% of votes cast) against 6,648 "No" votes.

== Geography ==
Naga is located within the province of Camarines Sur at the southeastern part of Luzon, 15 kilometres (9.3 mi) from Pili, the capital of Camarines Sur, and 435 kilometres (270 mi) southeast of Manila, the nation's capital, and near the center of the Bicol Region. Naga has a total land area of 84.48 km^{2} (8,448 hectares or about 32.62 square miles), often being deemed as the smallest city in the Bicol Region based on land mass.

It is located on the serpentine and historic Naga River, at the confluence of the Naga and Bikol rivers. Thus, it has always been an ideal place for trade, and as center for schools, church, and government offices.

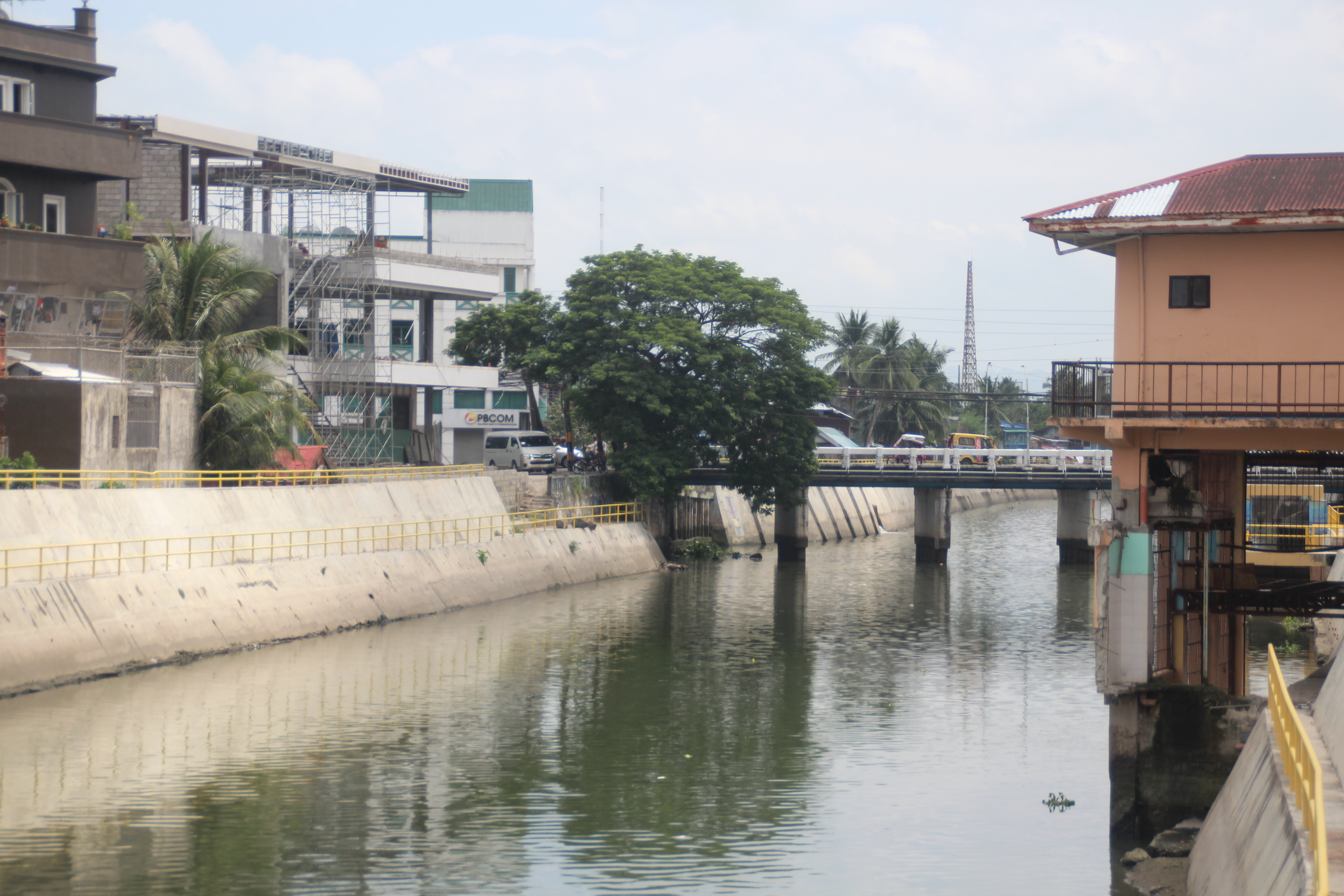
Naga River along San Francisco, Naga City

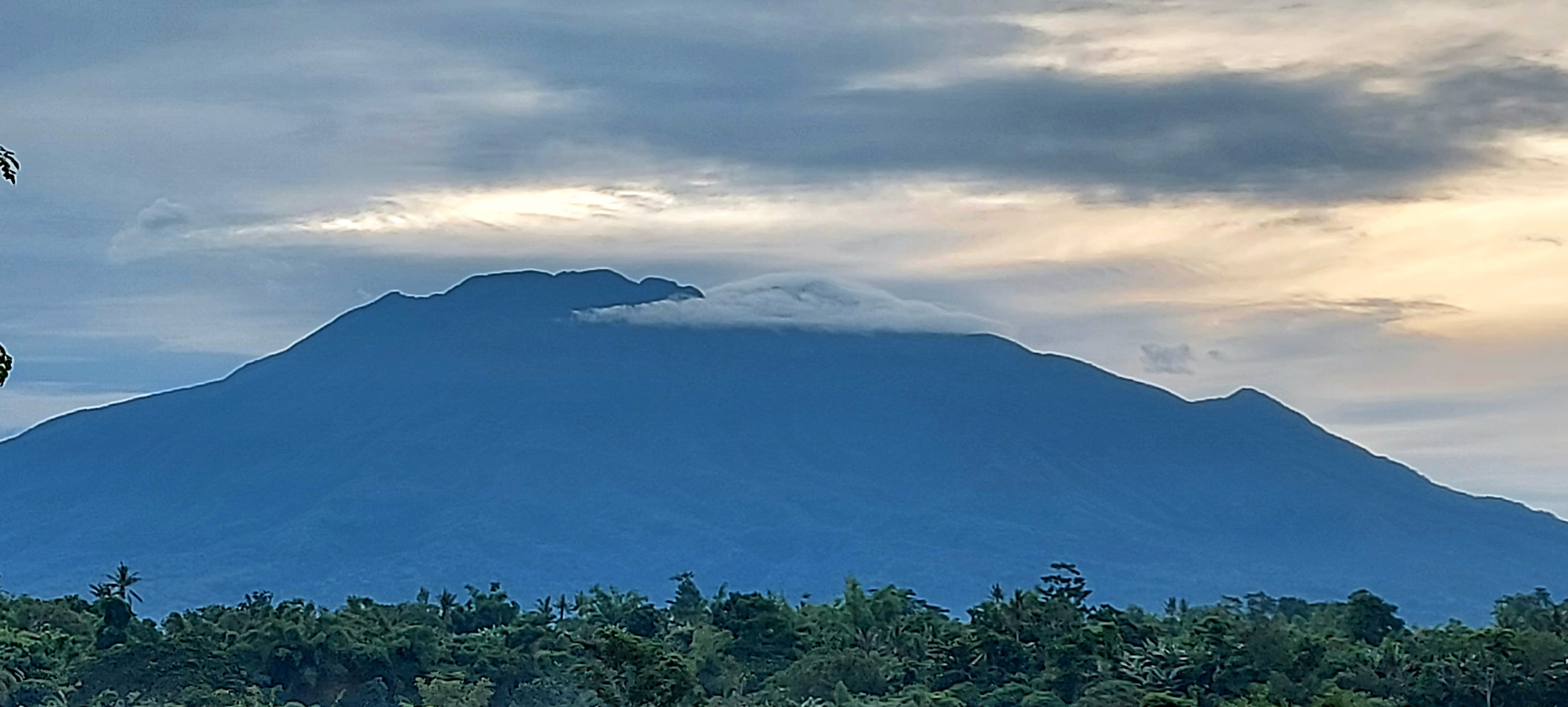
Mount Isarog

It is surrounded on all sides by forests and by rich agricultural and fishing areas. Included in its territory is a portion of Mount Isarog, Barangay Panicuason, a declared protected area known as Mount Isarog Natural Park covering 10,090.89 ha (24,935.1 acres).

=== Climate ===
Climate data for Naga
| Month | Jan | Feb | Mar | Apr | May | Jun | Jul | Aug | Sep | Oct | Nov | Dec | Year |
|---|---|---|---|---|---|---|---|---|---|---|---|---|---|
| Mean daily maximum °C (°F) | 30.2 (86.4) | 31.1 (88.0) | 32.8 (91.0) | 34.3 (93.7) | 34.2 (93.6) | 32.4 (90.3) | 31.3 (88.3) | 30.8 (87.4) | 31.1 (88.0) | 31.2 (88.2) | 31.0 (87.8) | 30.3 (86.5) | 31.7 (89.1) |
| Daily mean °C (°F) | 25.6 (78.1) | 26.1 (79.0) | 27.6 (81.7) | 29.1 (84.4) | 29.5 (85.1) | 28.4 (83.1) | 27.7 (81.9) | 27.4 (81.3) | 27.6 (81.7) | 27.3 (81.1) | 26.9 (80.4) | 26.0 (78.8) | 27.4 (81.4) |
| Mean daily minimum °C (°F) | 20.9 (69.6) | 21.1 (70.0) | 22.5 (72.5) | 24.0 (75.2) | 24.8 (76.6) | 24.4 (75.9) | 24.1 (75.4) | 24.0 (75.2) | 24.0 (75.2) | 23.5 (74.3) | 22.8 (73.0) | 21.6 (70.9) | 23.1 (73.6) |
| Average precipitation mm (inches) | 6.3 (0.25) | 3.3 (0.13) | 7.1 (0.28) | 9.3 (0.37) | 100.4 (3.95) | 272.7 (10.74) | 341.2 (13.43) | 398.3 (15.68) | 326.0 (12.83) | 230.0 (9.06) | 120.4 (4.74) | 48.8 (1.92) | 1,863.8 (73.38) |
| Average rainy days | 1.0 | 1.0 | 1.0 | 1.0 | 7.0 | 14.0 | 16.0 | 19.0 | 17.0 | 13.0 | 9.0 | 5.0 | 104 |

According to the Köppen climate classification system, Naga has a tropical savanna climate.

The weather in the city from March to May is hot and dry, with temperatures ranging from 24 to 34 °C (75 to 93 °F). The typhoon season is from June to October, and the weather then is generally rainy. From November to February, the climate is cooler with temperatures ranging from 22 to 28 °C (72 to 82 °F). The average year-round humidity is 77%.

=== Barangays ===
Naga is politically subdivided into 27 barangays. Each barangay consists of puroks and some have sitios.

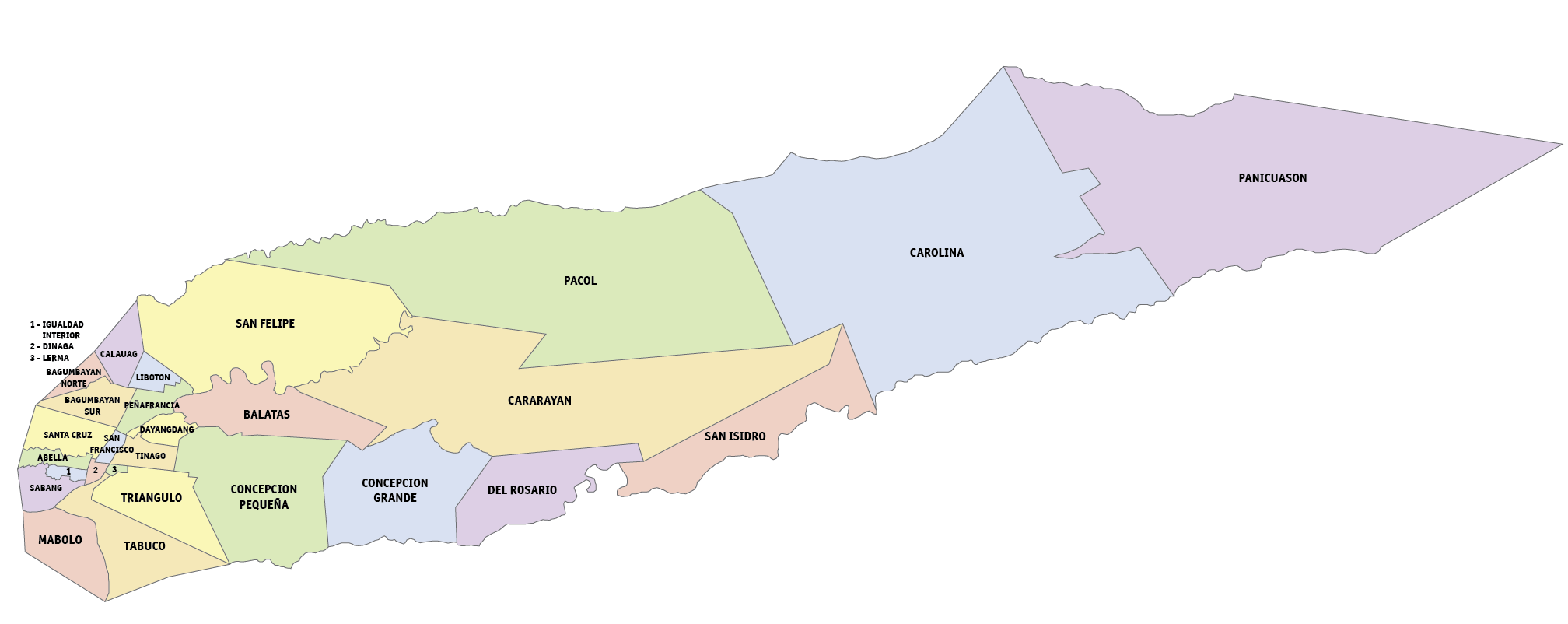
Political subdivisions of Naga

| Barangays | Class | Population | Barangay head |
|---|---|---|---|
| Abella | Urban | 5,757 | Hon. Apolinario Malana Jr. |
| Bagumbayan Norte | Urban | 2,203 | Hon. Raquel Tutanes |
| Bagumbayan Sur | Urban | 7,867 | Hon. Josephine Camba |
| Balatas | Urban | 11,112 | Hon. Ferdinand De Hitta |
| Calauag | Urban | 11,295 | Hon. Ma. Corazon Peñaflor |
| Cararayan | Urban | 19,692 | Hon. Rodrigo Agravante Jr. |
| Carolina | Urban | 6,870 | Ho. Leoncio Libuit |
| Concepcion Grande | Urban | 11,125 | Hon. Jerrold Rito |
| Concepcion Pequeña | Urban | 25,139 | Hon. Juan Francis Mendoza |
| Dayangdang | Urban | 4,130 | Hon. Julius Cesar Sanchez |
| Del Rosario | Urban | 10,337 | Hon. Jose Peñas III |
| Dinaga | Urban | 344 | Hon. Ma. Cristina Intia |
| Igualdad Interior | Urban | 3,008 | Hon. Angelito Bendiola |
| Lerma | Urban | 1,640 | Hon. Domingo Serrado |
| Liboton | Urban | 3,105 | Hon. Ronald Luntok |
| Mabolo | Urban | 8,125 | Hon. Arthur Matos |
| Pacol | Urban | 14,747 | Hon Ruben Limbo |
| Panicuason | Urban | 3,100 | Hon. Domingo Ramos |
| Peñafrancia | Urban | 4,503 | Hon. Jacky Villafuerte |
| Sabang | Urban | 6,838 | Hon. Cyrus Caballero |
| San Felipe | Urban | 21,098 | Hon. Alfonso Rodriguez |
| San Francisco | Urban | 722 | Hon. Efren Nepomuceno |
| San Isidro | Urban | 3,432 | Hon. Veronica Panganiban |
| Santa Cruz | Urban | 7,135 | Hon. Felix Matias Largo |
| Tabuco | Urban | 4,240 | Hon. Elisa Carmona |
| Tinago | Urban | 2,904 | Hon. Estelita Bautista |
| Triangulo | Urban | 8,702 | Hon. Raymund Arevalo |

== Demographics ==
Population census of Naga
| Year | Pop. | ±% p.a. |
|---|---|---|
| 1903 | 17,943 | — |
| 1918 | 9,396 | −4.22% |
| 1939 | 22,505 | +4.25% |
| 1948 | 56,238 | +10.71% |
| 1960 | 55,506 | −0.11% |
| 1970 | 79,846 | +3.70% |
| 1975 | 83,337 | +0.86% |
| 1980 | 90,712 | +1.71% |
| 1990 | 115,329 | +2.43% |
| 1995 | 126,972 | +1.82% |
| 2000 | 137,810 | +1.77% |
| 2007 | 160,516 | +2.13% |
| 2010 | 174,931 | +3.18% |
| 2015 | 196,003 | +2.19% |
| 2020 | 209,170 | +1.38% |
| 2024 | 210,545 | +0.16% |
Source: Philippine Statistics Authority

According to the 2024 census, the population of Naga is 210,545 people, with a density of 2,300/km^{2}. Naga had an average annual population growth of 1.29% between 2010 and 2020 according to same census. All populated areas of the city are classified as urban. Naga City has about the same population as Legazpi City (209,533).

=== Religion ===
==== Roman Catholicism ====
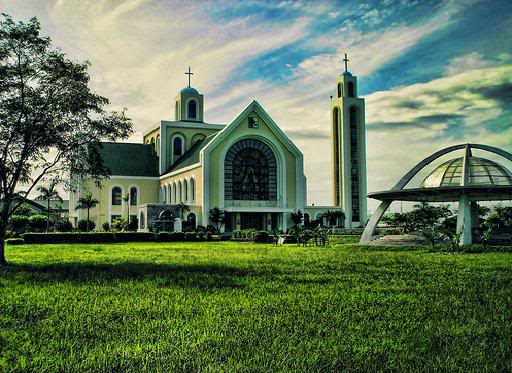
Minor Basilica of Our Lady of Peñafrancia

The city is the ecclesiastical seat of the Archdiocese of Caceres, which oversees the Catholic population in the Bicol Region, whose archbishop is the primate of the region. This dominant faith is supported by the presence of old and influential Catholic institutions, from universities to churches run by different religious institutes, notably the Ateneo de Naga University by the Jesuits; the Universidad de Santa Isabel by the Daughters of Charity; the Naga Metropolitan Cathedral, which is the oldest cathedral that is still standing in Luzon outside Metro Manila; Peñafrancia Basilica Minore, which is the largest Catholic structure in southern Luzon in terms of size and land area; Our Lady of Peñafrancia Shrine; the historic San Francisco Church; and Peñafrancia Museum.

==== Other Christian faiths ====
Protestant denominations in the city include Seventh-day Adventists and Bible Baptists, whose churches are located along Magsaysay Avenue, while other Protestants attend the Methodist Church which is among the old structures along Peñafrancia Avenue.

The Assemblies of God maintains a fast-growing ministry in Naga. Aside from Naga Bethel Church (formerly Naga Bethel Temple), which is located on Felix Plazo Street, other local congregations are Philippians Christian Fellowship (in barangays San Felipe), Gethsemane Christian Ministries (in Carolina), and outreach ministries in other barangays.

The largest minority religion in Naga is Iglesia ni Cristo (INC). INC has several chapels in different barangays in the city, and the local congregation is the largest in the district. It is followed by The Church of Jesus Christ of Latter-day Saints (formerly known as "Mormon") which has several congregations (wards) with their main church building situated along Panganiban Drive not far from the INC's.

There is also a concentration of Jesus Miracle Crusade ministries in the city.

==== Other religions ====
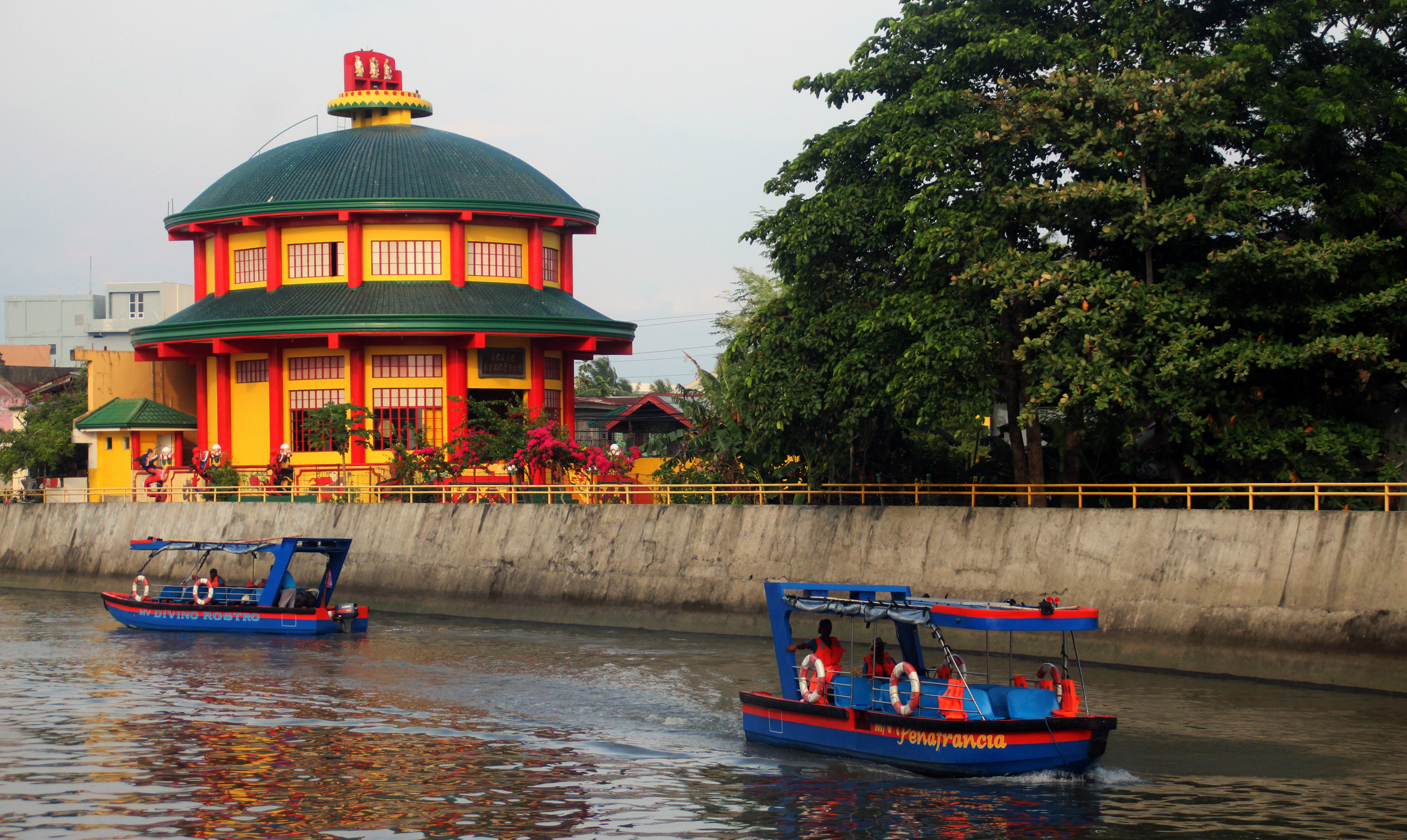
Taoist Temple along Naga river

Muslims, Sikhs, and Taoists can also be found in the city.

=== Language ===
The Coastal Bikol-Central dialect of the Coastal Bikol language is the dominant dialect spoken by the population in Naga. Central Standard Bikol is also the basis for other dialects in the Bicol Region. The majority of the city's population can understand and speak English, Filipino, and Tagalog. Because of the influx of people from the Rinconada area that are studying in different universities, Rinconada Bikol can also be heard in different schools and throughout the city. Some Nagueños have varying degrees of proficiency with Rinconada Bikol, since the southern half of Pili, which is the boundary between Rinconada Bikol and Coastal Bikol speakers, is just few kilometers away from Naga. Although the main language is Bikol, and the medium of instruction in school is English, people in Naga usually tell time and count in Spanish.

==== Isarog Agta Language ====
In 2010, UNESCO released its 3rd volume of Atlas of the World's Languages in Danger, where three critically endangered languages were in the Philippines. One of these is the Isarog Agta language, of the Isarog Agta people, who live on Mount Isarog and are one of the original Negrito settlers in the Philippines, belonging to the Aeta people classification but with language and belief systems unique to their own culture and heritage.

Only five Isarog Agta spoke their indigenous language in the year 2000. The language was classified as "Critically Endangered", meaning the youngest speakers are grandparents and older, speak the language partially and infrequently, and hardly pass the language to their children and grandchildren. If the remaining 150 Isarog Agta do not pass their native language to the next generation, it will be extinct within one to two decades.

== Economy ==
Poverty incidence of Naga (%)

Source: Philippine Statistics Authority

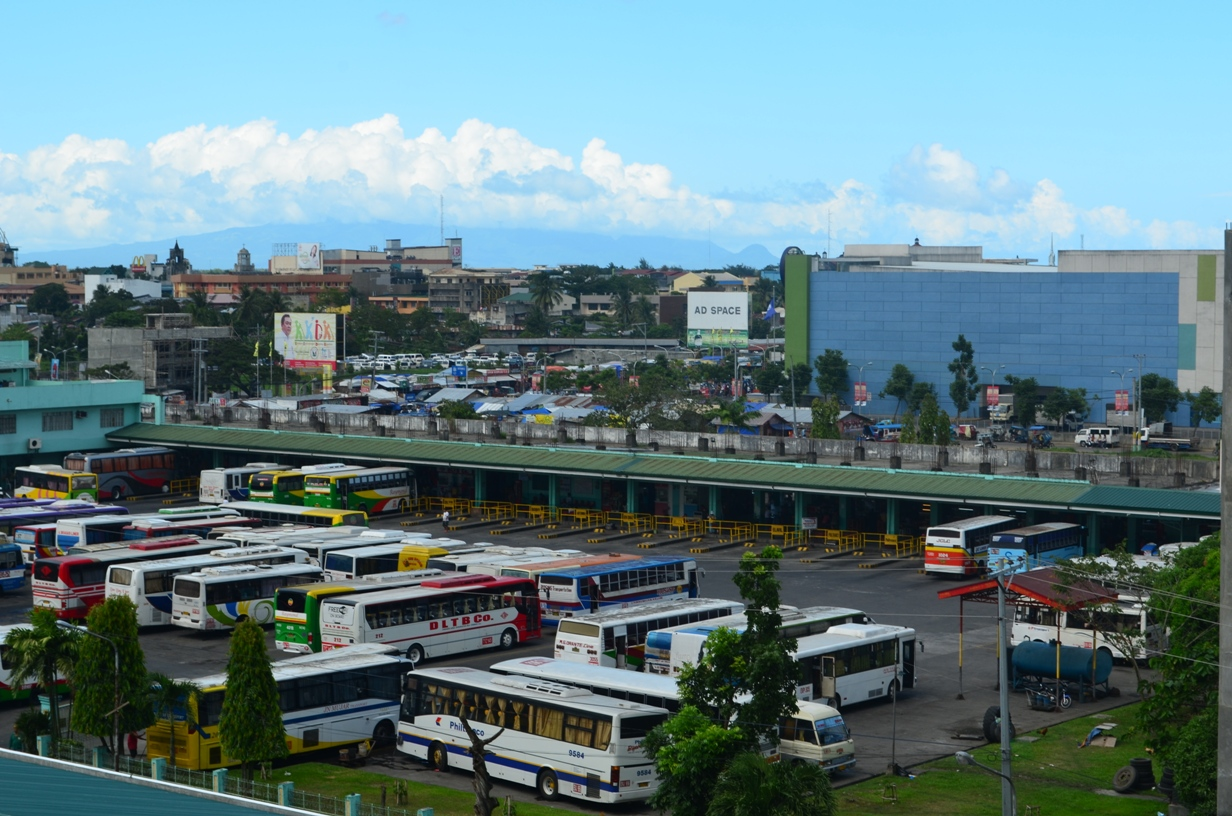
Central Business District 2

Naga is the Bicol Region's center of commerce and industry. Strategically located at the midway of Bicol, Naga is the trade center in Bicol for goods from Luzon and Visayas. Naga was inducted into the “Hall of Fame – Most Business Friendly City” by the Philippine Chamber of Commerce & Industry for being a reliable partner to the business community. Based from the Cities and Municipalities Competitiveness Index (CMCI) released annually by the Department of Trade and Industry (DTI), National Competitiveness Council, and United States Agency for International Development since 2013, Naga is the number one most competitive component city in the Philippines from 2015 to 2016; and from 2021 to 2024 out of 116 component cities in the country.

The city's economy was severely impacted by the COVID-19 pandemic during mid-2020 and was estimated that its assets contracted by around 4% and an unidentified number of small to medium businesses closed. In the 2nd quarter of 2021 following the 11-12% quarterly growth of the country, several businesses in the city reopened. From 2021, the city is experiencing steady economic improvement and growth.

=== Business districts ===
Naga City People's Mall (Public Market)

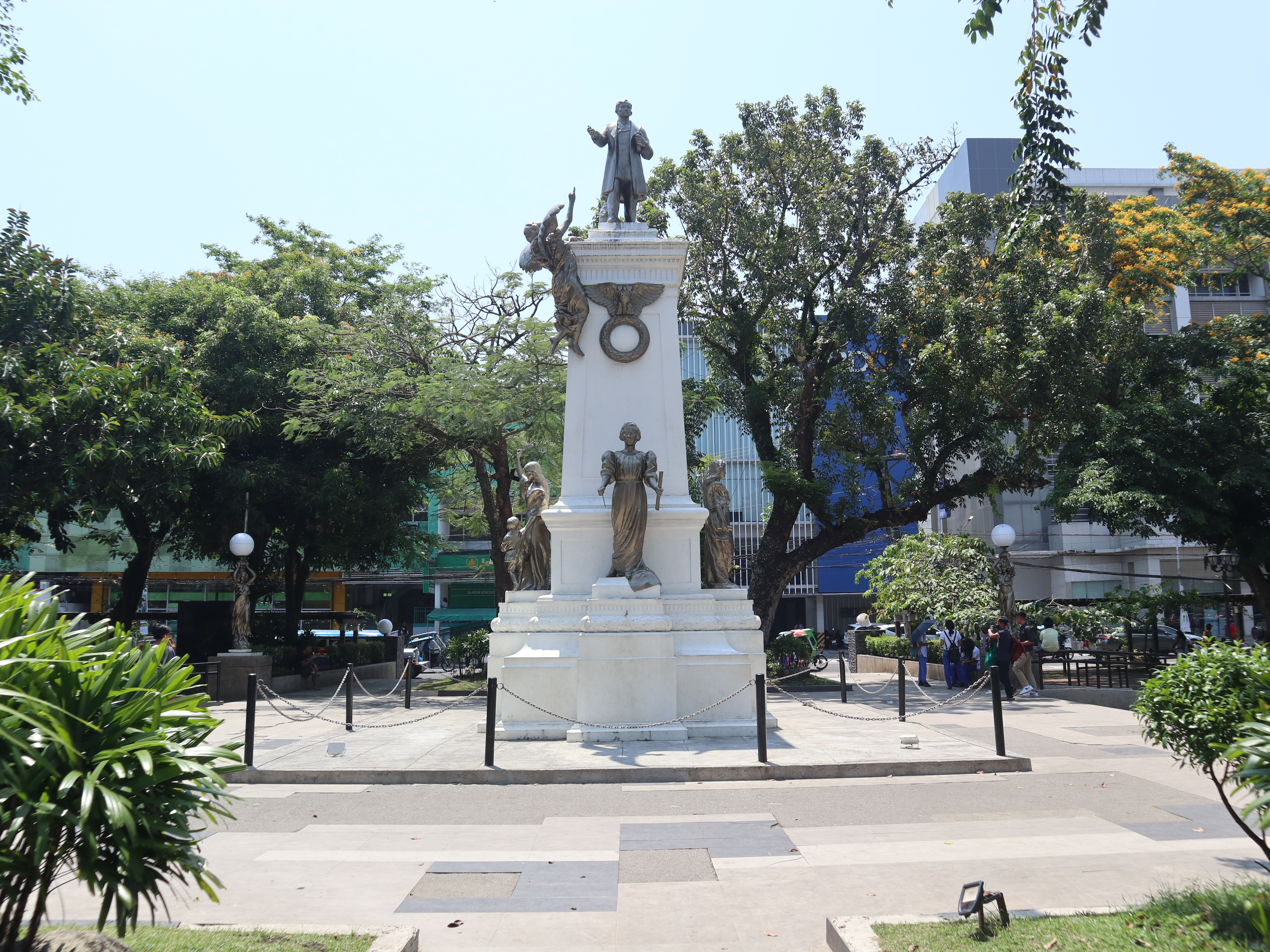
Plaza Rizal

Downtown Naga (commonly called "Centro") is located in the southern part of the city. It is bordered on the north by the Naga University Belt and on the south by the historical Naga City People's Mall or simply Naga City Community Supermarket. It encompasses the three public plazas of Naga: The Plaza Quince Martires, The Plaza Quezon, and the Plaza Rizal, which is the center of Central Business District 1 (CBD-1). Downtown Naga is the location of local businesses that sell local delicacies and native products from neighboring municipalities and provinces.

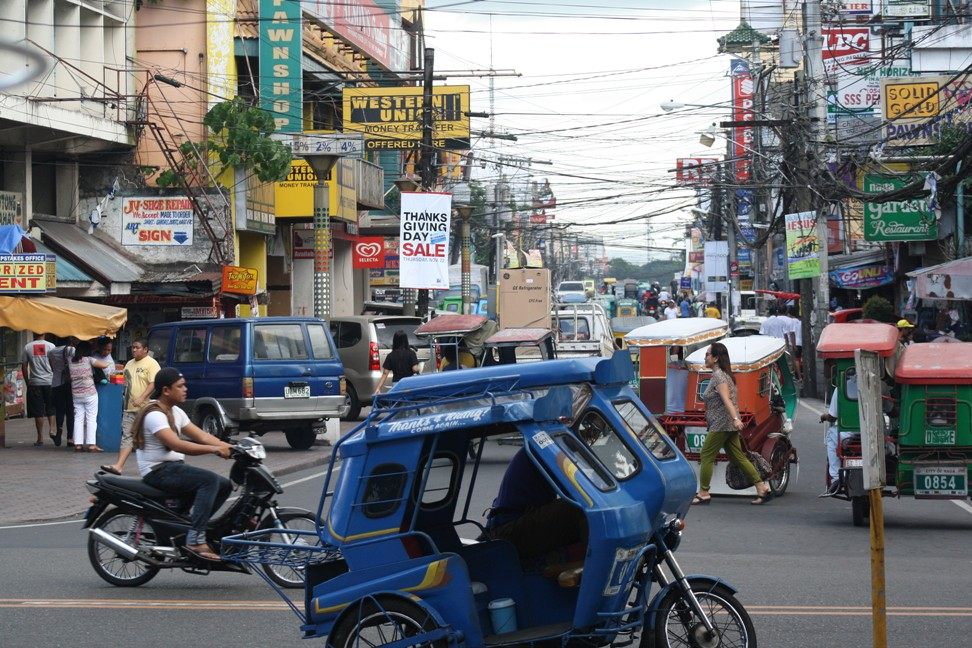
Panganiban Drive

A second business district, known as the Central Business District 2 (CBD-2), is located along Panganiban Drive and Roxas, Ninoy, and Cory avenues. It is also the location of several shopping complexes (S&R, Landers, SM, Robinsons and LCC Malls), a central bus terminal and PUV south-bound terminal, and the Naga City IT Park, which houses several business process outsourcing offices.

=== South Riverfront growth area ===
South Riverfront is composed of the whole of Barangay Sabang except those areas that are socialized housing sites or are otherwise excluded by the Naga City land-use plan for commercial or industrial development. It is bordered by CBD-1 (to the east), the Naga River, and the town of Camaligan, Camarines Sur.

=== Magsaysay district ===
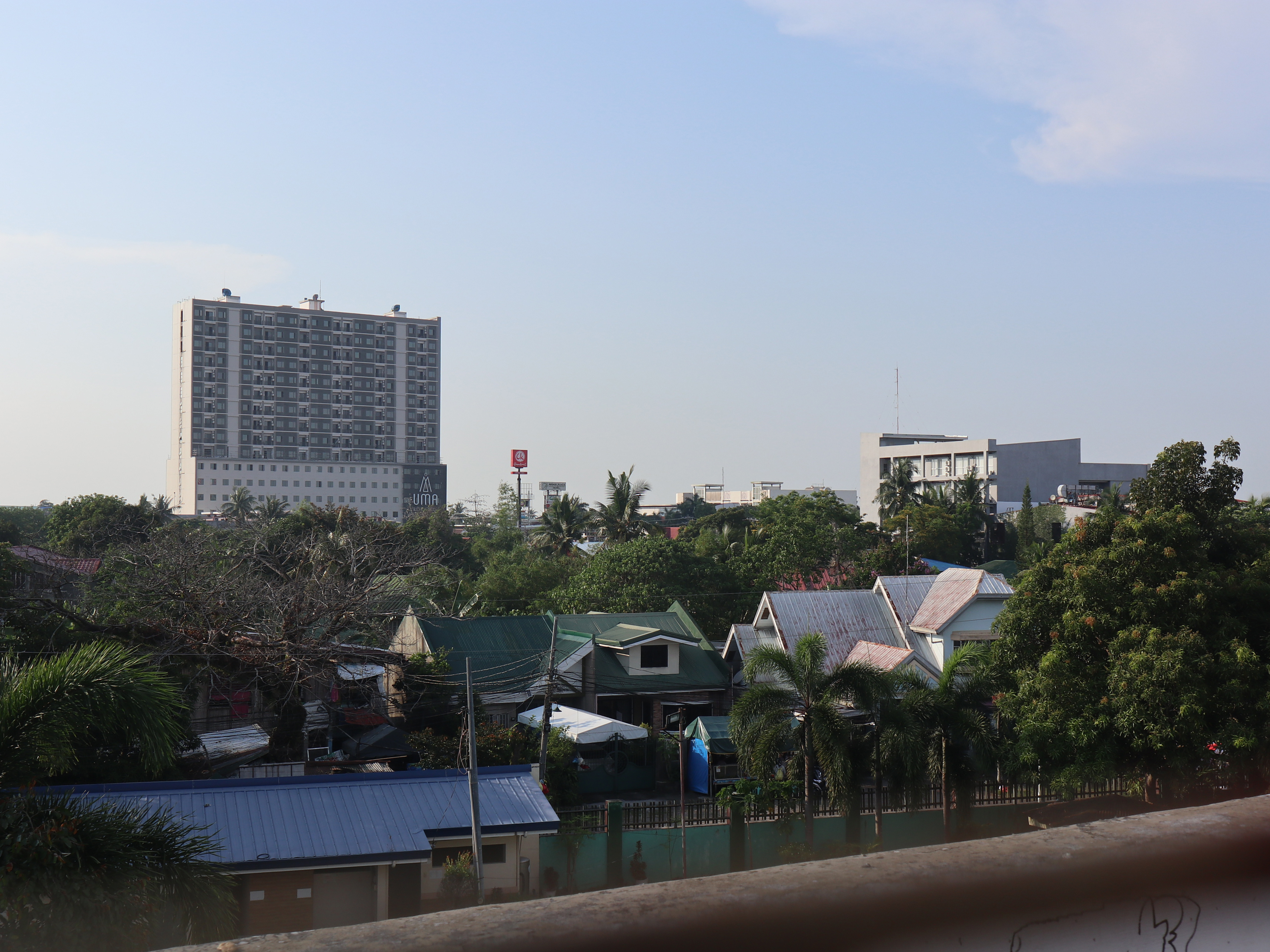
Naga City-Magsaysay skyline.

The main road in the city is Magsaysay Avenue, or Boulevard, which runs from Bagumbayan Road (Naga-Calabanga–Siruma–Garchitorena–Partido North Road), connecting it to Magsaysay district, where accommodations and restaurants catering to travelers are found. Businesses are usually open until late at night, with some shops open 24/7. Naga also has its share of fastfood restaurant chains. The city hall and several provincial offices are also located in the district, around the Peñafrancia Basilica.

=== Naga City Industrial Park ===
A sprawling 25+ hectares of land is the Naga City Export Processing Zone in Barangay Carolina, Naga City (Proclamation No. 299, s. 2023), to cater light manufacturing industries focused on high-value engineering products destined for export. First of its kind in Naga and the Bicol Region, the export processing zone will boost the city's economy, provide employment opportunities, and bolster the country's export manufacturing sector.

=== Banking and finance ===
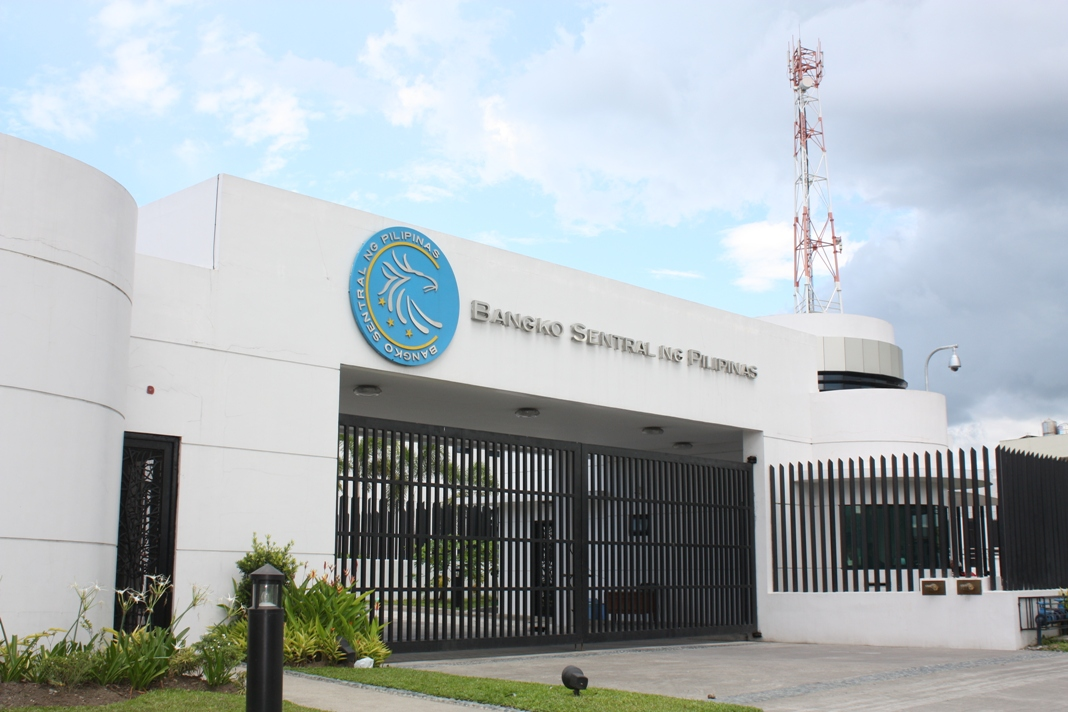
Bangko Sentral ng Pilipinas (Central Bank of the Philippines) South Luzon headquarters, located at Roxas Avenue, Naga City.

There are currently 470 banking and financial institutions in the city. The city is also home to the regional headquarters of Banco de Oro (BDO), Philippine National Bank (PNB), Metrobank, RCBC, Allied Bank, China Banking Corporation, Philtrust Bank, UnionBank of the Philippines, Philippine Veterans Bank, Asia United Bank (AUB), Maybank, Bank of Commerce, East West Bank, Bank of Makati, Bank of the Philippine Islands (BPI), and the Philippine Postal Savings Bank. Government owned and controlled banks which include Landbank of the Philippines and Development Bank of the Philippines (DBP) have satellite offices in the city while the South Luzon headquarters of Bangko Sentral ng Pilipinas (BSP), which oversees and regulates banking, financial, and lending establishments in the entire Bicol Region as well as CALABARZON and MIMAROPA, is located in Roxas Avenue.

=== Shopping malls and Hotels ===
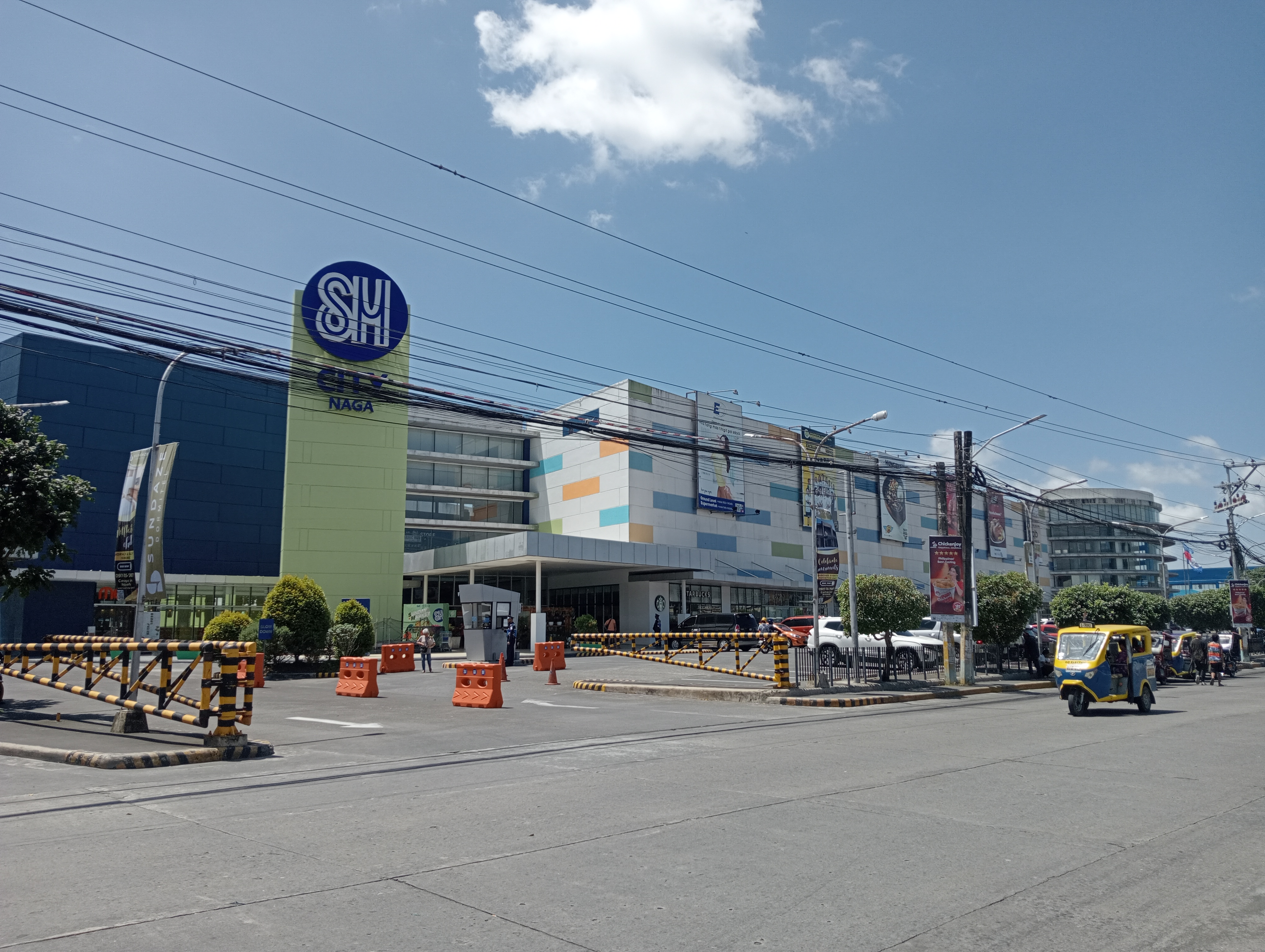
SM City Naga

SM City Naga, the first SM Supermall in Bicol Region opened in 2009. LCC Mall Naga, located at Felix Plazo Street, Sabang was opened in 1997 becoming the city's first full-service shopping mall, while Nagaland E-Mall, was opened in 2004, is in Downtown Naga. Built in 2005, Avenue Square is the region's first "lifestyle center", along Magsaysay Avenue. Super Metro Hypermarket, opened in 2015 is near Bicol Medical Center while Robinsons Place Naga opened in 2017, followed by Vista Mall Naga in 2018 along Maharlika Highway, in Barangay Del Rosario. Both S&R Membership Shopping and Landers Superstore which opened in 2023 and 2024, respectively, are located along Roxas Avenue. Leisure hubs abound in the city proper and suburbs but most of which are in Magsaysay Avenue, Dayangdang, and along Roxas Avenue (Diversion Road). There are more than sixty (60) hotels and inns within the city proper, having two 4-star hotels: Avenue Plaza Hotel and Summit Hotel Naga, and ten (10) 3-star hotels.

=== IT–Business Process outsourcing ===
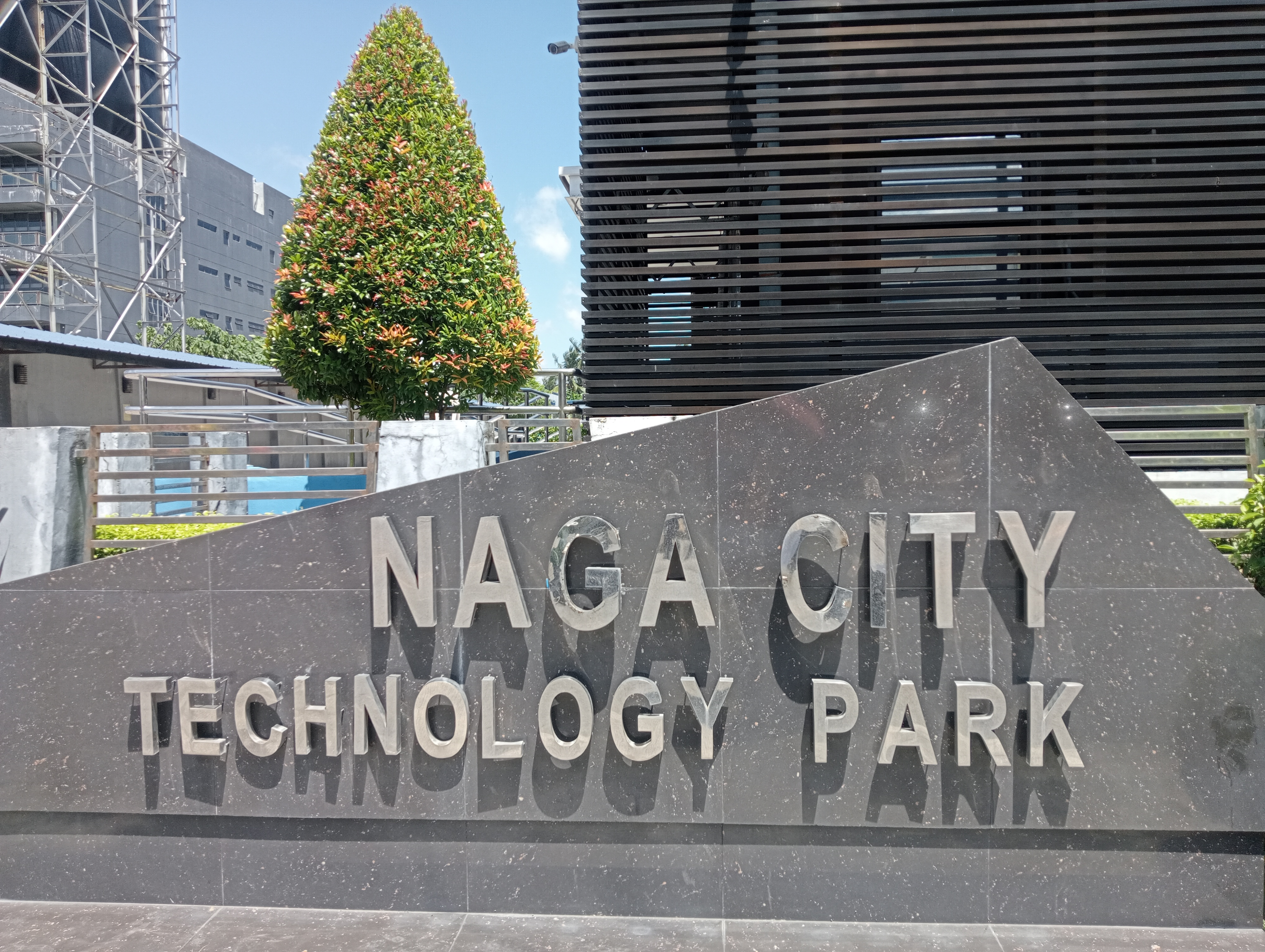
Naga City Technology Park

Naga was cited as one of the best places to conduct information technology–business process outsourcing (IT–BPO) activities in the Philippines.

As of 2024, the city currently has several IT parks and centers (registered special eco-zones) — the Naga City IT Park (Triangulo IT Park, Proclamation No. 616, s. 2013), ALDP E-Park, ANR Business Center, and the Robinsons Cybergate Naga.

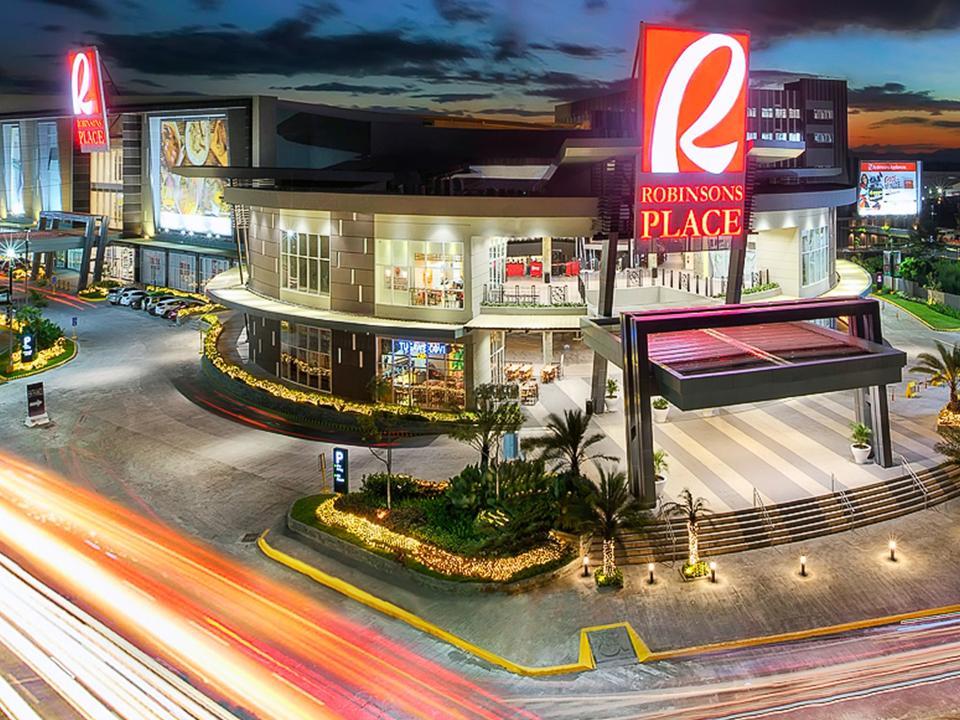
Cybergate Naga

Current clients include IBM, Quantrics, Concentrix, ProbeCX (formerly known as Stellar), Klasp Global Solutions, and Digital Minds BPO.

== Culture ==
Naga is considered to be Bicol's cultural center, due to the largest festival in the region, the Peñafrancia Festival, being held in the city.

=== Festivals ===
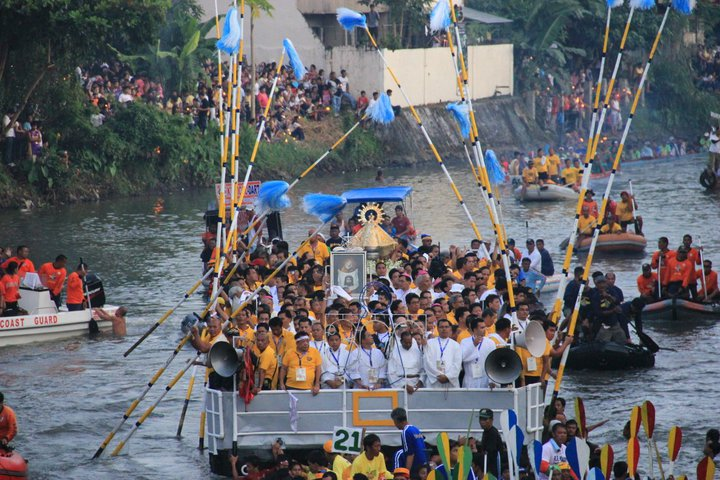
Fluvial Procession for Our Lady of Peñafrancia

==== Peñafrancia Festival ====
The city celebrates the feast of Nuestra Señora de Peñafrancia (Our Lady of Peñafrancia), the patroness of the Bicol Regio. Starting on the second Friday of September each year, the 10-day feast, the largest Marian devotion in the country. The start of the festival is signalled by a procession (or Translacion) when the centuries-old image of the Blessed Virgin Mary is transferred from its shrine at the Peñafrancia Basilica Minore de Nuestra Señora de Peñafrancia to the 400-year-old Naga Metropolitan Cathedral. Coinciding with nine days of novena prayer at the cathedral, the city celebrates with parades, pageants, street parties, singing contests, exhibits, concerts, and other activities. Finally, on the third Saturday of September, the image is returned, shoulder-borne by so-called voyadores, to the basilica via the historic Naga River. The following day marks the feast day of Our Lady of Peñafrancia, when Pontifical High Masses are celebrated in the basilica, attended by hundreds of thousands of faithful devotees.

==== Kamundagan Festival ====
Naga celebrates the Kamundagan Festival every Christmas. It begins with the lighting of the Christmas Village in the Plaza Quezon Grandstand.

==== Kinalas Festival ====
Naga celebrates the Kinalas Festival during its yearly anniversary of chartership or cityhood. It honors local delicacies, including kinalas and siling labuyo, with a food contest.

=== Food and delicacies ===
Naga is known for some native foods and delicacies.

Kinalas and log-log are noodle soup dishes served Bicol style, similar to mami except for a topping of what looks like a pansit palabok sauce, and the meaty dark soup made from boiling a cow's or a pig's head until the flesh falls off. Kinalas is from the old Bicol word kalas, which refers to the "fall off the bone" meat that is placed on top of the noodles. The soup is the broth of beef bone and bone marrow (sometimes skull and brain included) or what Manileños call bulalo. The soup is topped with very tender meat slices that also come from the head. It is usually served hot with an egg, and sprinkled with roasted garlic and spring onions. Kalamansi and patis may be added according to taste. Kinalas is usually paired with Baduya, or with Banana or camote cue.

Other delicacies, such as, buko juice, nata de coco, and pan de Naga are found in the city.

== Sports ==
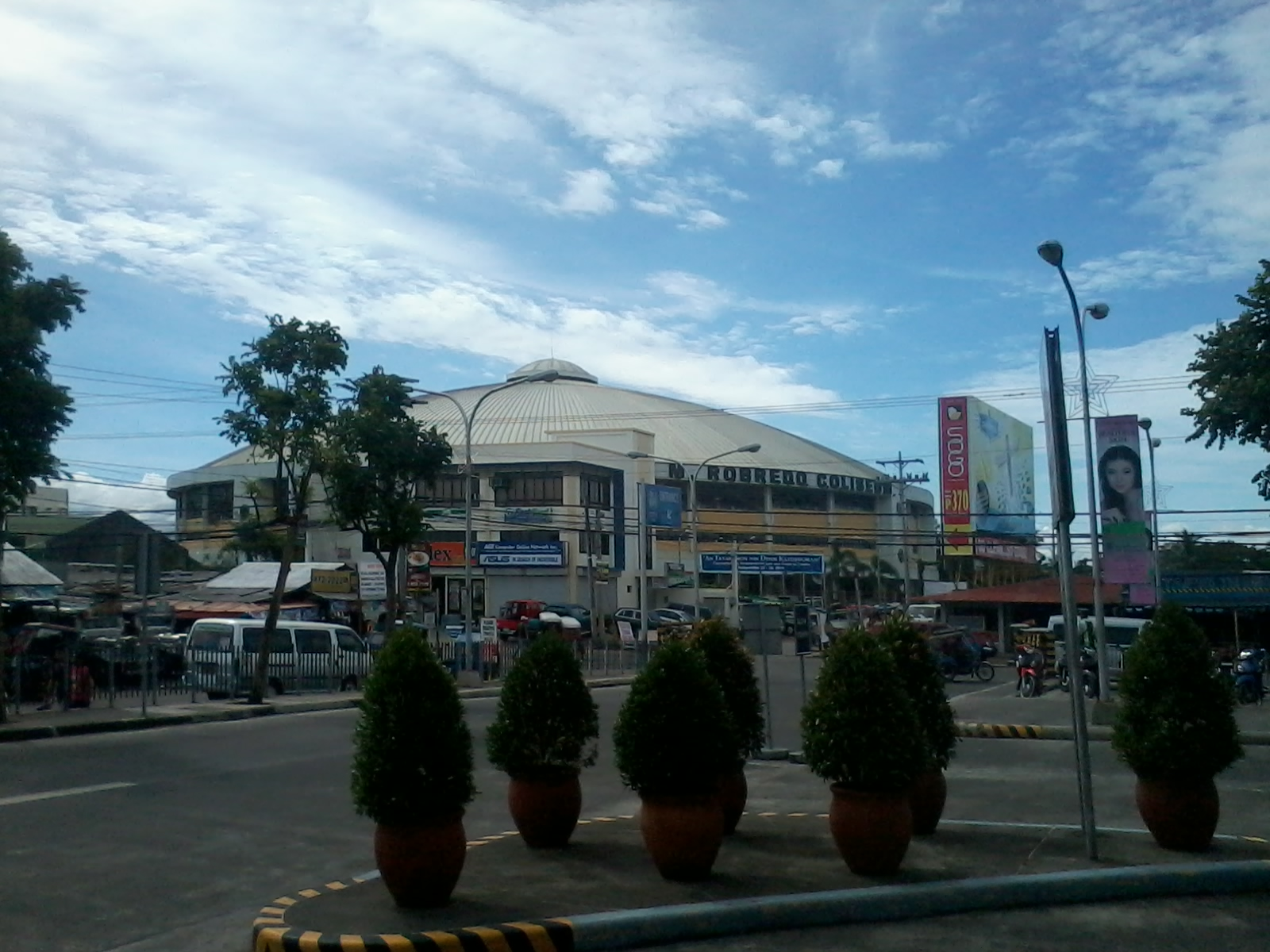
Jesse M. Robredo Coliseum

The Metro Naga Sports Complex, in Barangay Pacol, has Olympic-sized swimming pools, tennis courts, and a track oval.

The Jesse M. Robredo Coliseum, formerly the Naga City Coliseum which is renamed in honor of the late DILG secretary and former mayor of Naga, is the largest indoor arena in southern Luzon.

== Transportation ==
=== Airport ===
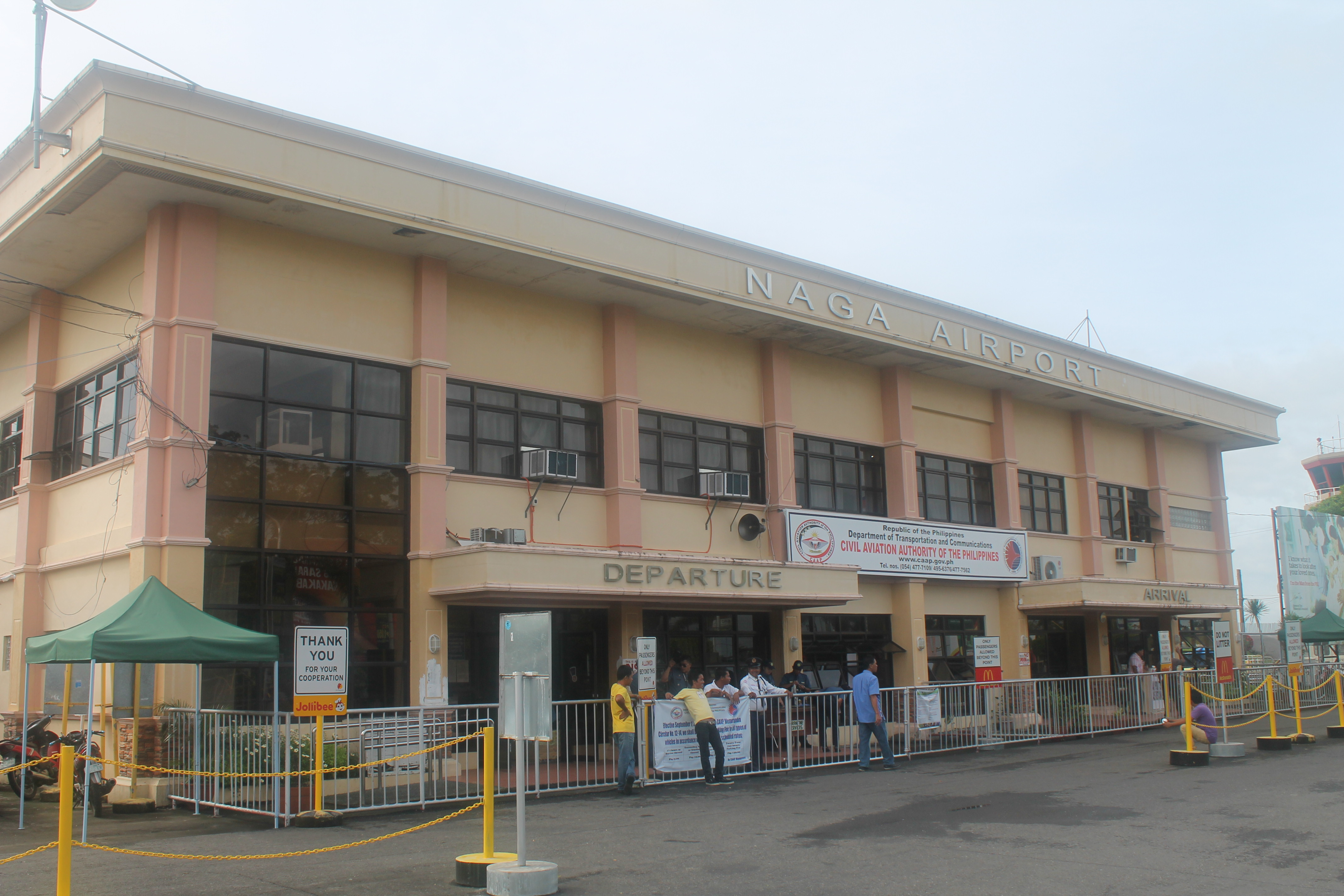
Naga Airport

The city is served by Naga Airport (WNP) located in Barangay San Jose in the neighboring town of Pili. It has a runway of 1,402 meters (4,600 ft) and thus is capable of handling only small aircraft.

=== Railways ===
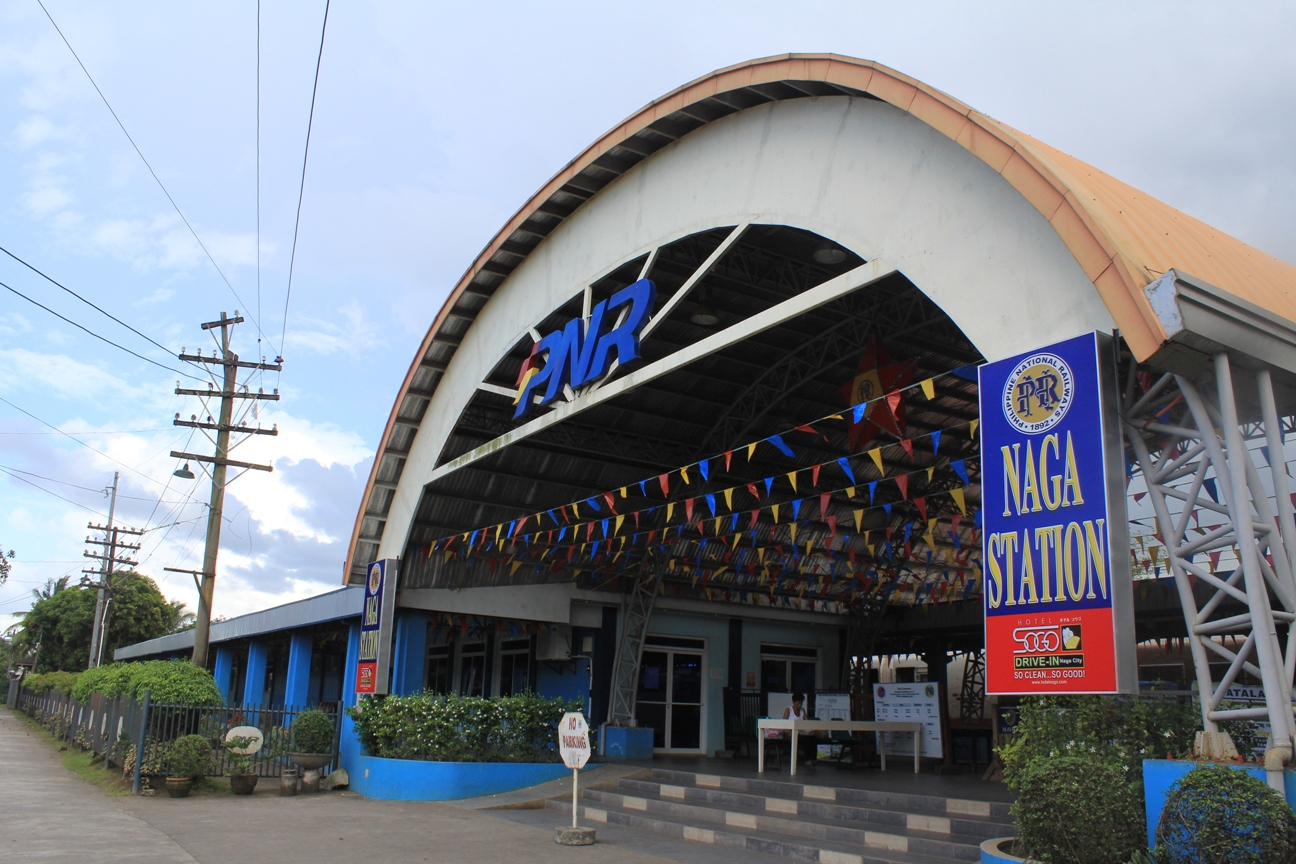
Philippine National Railways Naga Station

Naga is the regional head office and the center point of the Philippine National Railway's Bicol Line.

Naga, along with adjacent towns and cities from Tagkawayan, Quezon Province to Ligao in Albay, is served daily by the Bicol Express. Naga City to Ligao City, Albay route resumed operations in July 2023, while Naga to Legazpi route resumed in December 2023.

=== Roads and bridges ===
As of December 2009, Naga's total road network is 185.02 kilometers (114.97 mi) in length, of which 147.67 kilometers (91.76 mi) are paved with concrete, 14.63 kilometers (9.09 mi) with asphalt overlay, 4.10 kilometers (2.55 mi) with asphalt, 11.87 kilometers (7.38 mi) are gravel, while 5.76 kilometers (3.58 mi) are dirt. This translates to an increase of 19.74 kilometers (12.27 mi) since 1998.

The city is connected to the capital Manila by the Andaya and Maharlika highways.

To spur development in the city, the Toll Regulatory Board declared Toll Road 5 as the extension of South Luzon Expressway. A 420 kilometres (260 mi), four-lane expressway starting from the terminal point of the under-construction SLEX Toll Road 4 at Barangay Mayao in Lucena City, Quezon, to Matnog, Sorsogon, near the Matnog Ferry Terminal. On August 25, 2020, San Miguel Corporation announced that it would fund the project, which would reduce travel time from Lucena to Matnog from 9 hours to 5.5 hours.

=== Public transportation ===
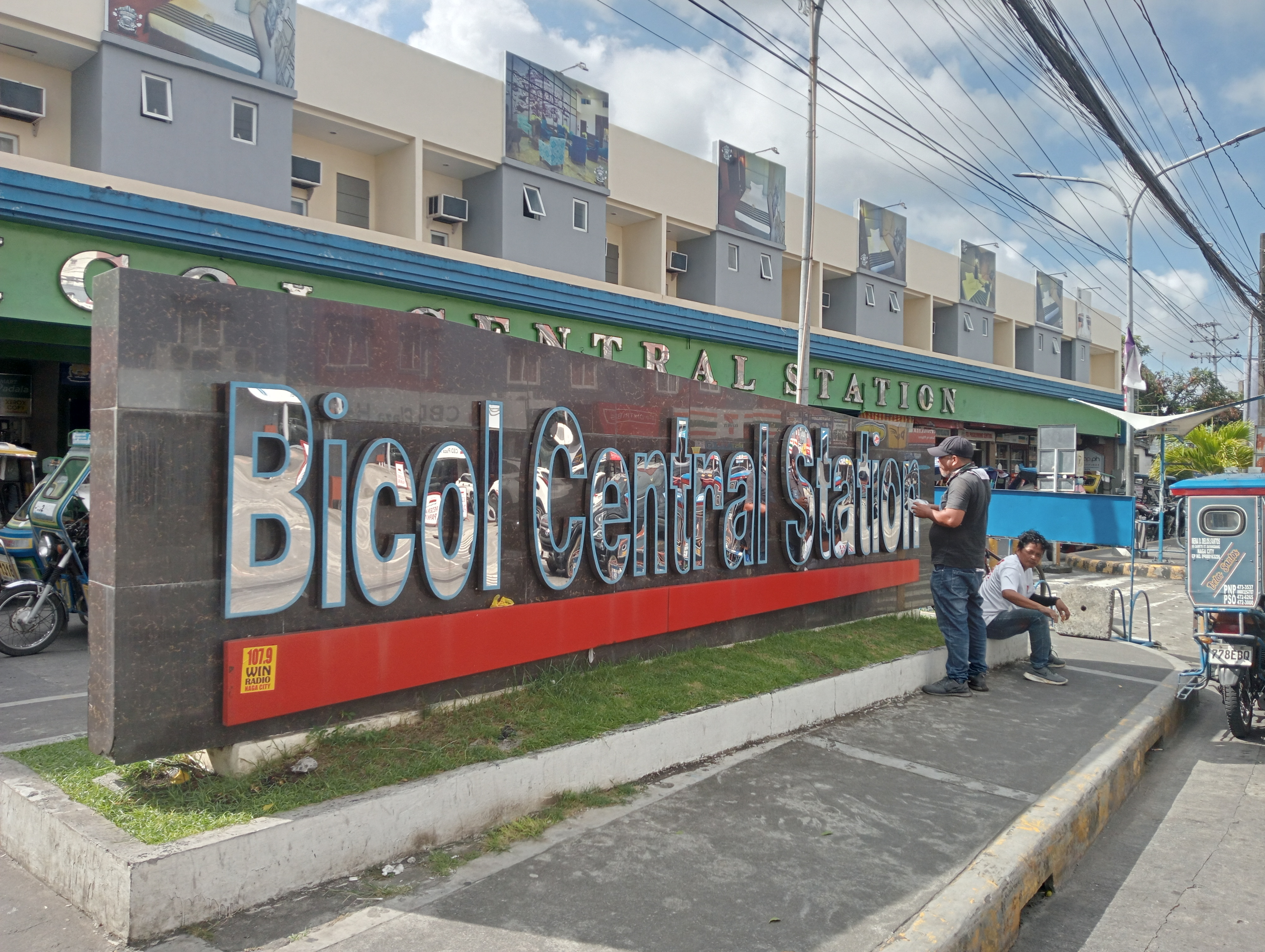
Bicol Central Station

The most common vehicles used for intra-city travel are public utility jeepneys (PUJ), multicabs, tricycles (trikes) and e-trikes, and padyak.

PUJs and multicabs, a total of 300+ units, are a major mode of intra-city transport used by regular commuters.

Trikes are the most used land transport in the city. There are around 1,500 units available for hire while 1,150 are for private use. Concerns with abusive local transport drivers, overcharging and traffic violations are reported and handled by the Naga City Public Safety Office and city transport franchising.

Padyak is commonly used in short distances such as subdivisions and barangay roads transportation. They are generally slow and small, perfect for cul-de-sacs and alleys.

Inter-town trips are served by 400+ filcab vans and 700+ jeepneys, while inter-provincial trips are served by an average of 300+ airconditioned and non-airconditioned buses and 80+ Filcab vans.

By 2019, about 50+ taxi units are available in the city. SM City Naga serves are their waiting area for passengers.

== Public services ==
=== Health care ===
Naga is the medical center of the Bicol Region. The largest hospitals include the government-owned Bicol Medical Center (1000-bed capacity by virtue of Republic Act No. 11478), and the Universidad de Sta Isabel – Mother Seton Hospital, owned and operated by the Daughters of Charity. The Metropolitan Naga Medical District, in Naga, is the only medical district in Bicol.

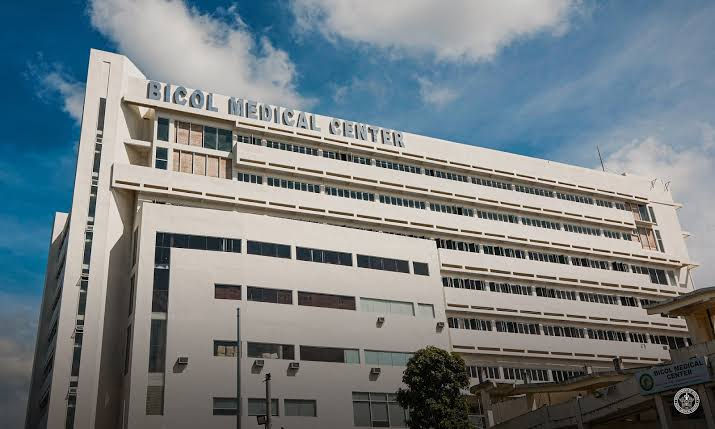
Bicol Medical Center

Bicol Medical Center (BMC) offers residency programs in anesthesia, otolaryngology, head and neck surgery (ENT), internal medicine, pathology and laboratories, obstetrics & gynecology, orthopedics, pediatrics, radiology, and surgery, among others. It is also a base hospital of the Helen Keller Foundation, where eye specialists from all over the country are trained and later assigned to different parts of the Philippines.

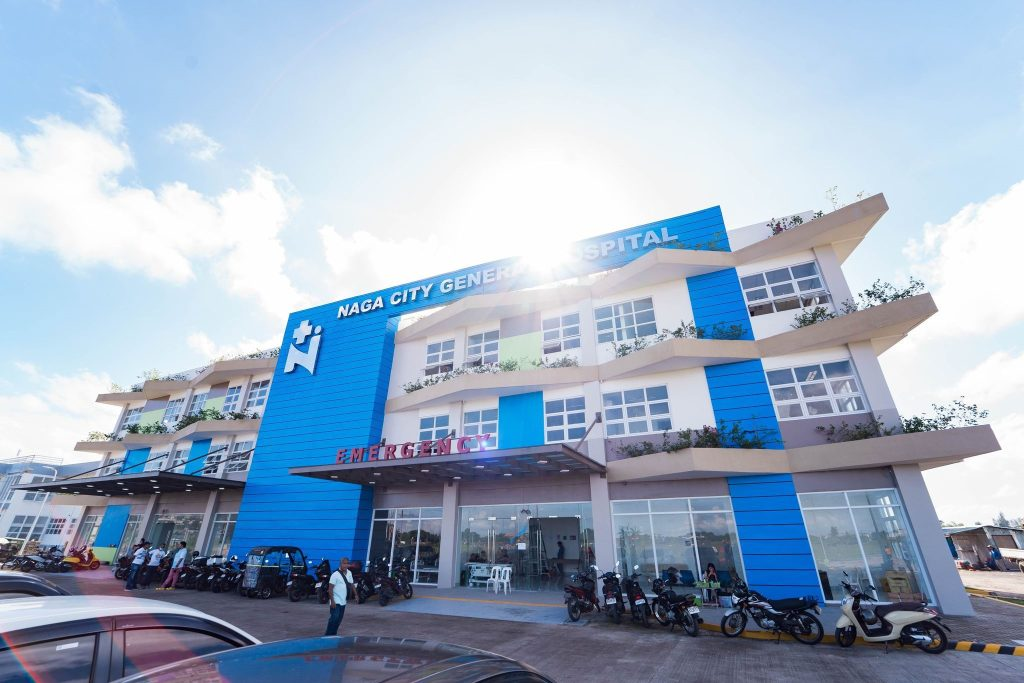
Naga City General Hospital

Universidad de Santa Isabel - Mother Seton Hospital (USI – MSH), is the largest private hospital in the region by number of admissions, medical equipment facilities, number of beds available, physical structure, and number of board-certified medical consultants. It is the only private hospital in Bicol offering specialty training programs, accredited by the Philippine Medical Association's component society, in major fields of medicine, such as internal medicine, pediatrics, and general surgery.

Located in Balatas Development Center, Balatas, Naga City, the Naga City General Hospital (NCGH), was inaugurated last December 12, 2023, to provide top-notch additional medical care and services to Naga City constituents.

NICC Doctors Hospital (Naga Imaging Center Cooperative Doctors Hospital, commonly known as “NICC”) is one of the leading private tertiary hospitals in Naga City, Camarines Sur, and a major component of the health care landscape of the Bicol Region. Strategically located along Roxas Avenue, Diversion Road, Barangay Triangulo, the Level-II hospital has a capacity of 156 beds and serves as a modern referral center for patients in Naga City as well as neighboring provinces across the region.

The Plaza Medica houses the Naga Endocrine Laboratory (also called the Endolab), a modern hormone laboratory and facility.

Bicol Access Health Centrum is another large hospital located in the city. It houses the Regional Disease Research Center, the first and only in the region.

Several secondary and tertiary hospitals can be found in the city.

=== Waste management and disposal ===
==== Solid waste ====
The main pollutants in the city come in the form of solid waste generated daily. Generally, these wastes come from various sources: residential, commercial, industrial, and institutional.

Naga generates approximately 85.8 tons of waste per year, based on the latest 2009 estimates, where agricultural waste makes up a little more than one-fourth (26%) of the total volume. Food waste makes up a slightly smaller share, at 23%. Paper-based materials compose 12%, while other categories contribute smaller percentages.

Solid wastes are disposed of and collected via the city's garbage trucks, which traverse ten routes on a daily basis. Collected wastes are then dumped at the new sanitary landfill in Barangay San Isidro, where they are segregated according to type of waste, and whether biodegradable or non-biodegradable.

==== Liquid waste ====
A study of wastewater treatment facilities is incorporated in the proposed septage management ordinance, where the city will be very strict in forcing compliance with proper waste treatment by housing and establishment owners. The local water-utility agency has made the Metro Naga Water District its local partner in providing septage services, in exchange for adding environmental fees to water bills.

The new wastewater treatment facility of SM City Naga, operational since April 20, 2009, has a capacity of 500 cubic meters per day; but at present, it is treating only around 200.

=== Fire safety ===
The Naga City Central Fire Station (BFP) is one of the most well equipped fire stations in the country. Other fire stations include Naga Chin Po Tong Fire Brigade, and the Naga White Volunteers.

=== Police and law enforcement ===
The city is the location of two of the largest police stations in the Bicol Region. The historic Naga City Police Station (now Naga City Police Office), which had been the military base of operations of the Guardia Civil in the region, during the time of Spanish rule. Another police office, located in Barangay Concepcion Grande, is the provincial office of the Philippine National Police for Camarines Sur.

== Education ==
Naga is the home of the three largest universities in the Bicol Region. The city is also the home of several colleges.

=== Tertiary education ===
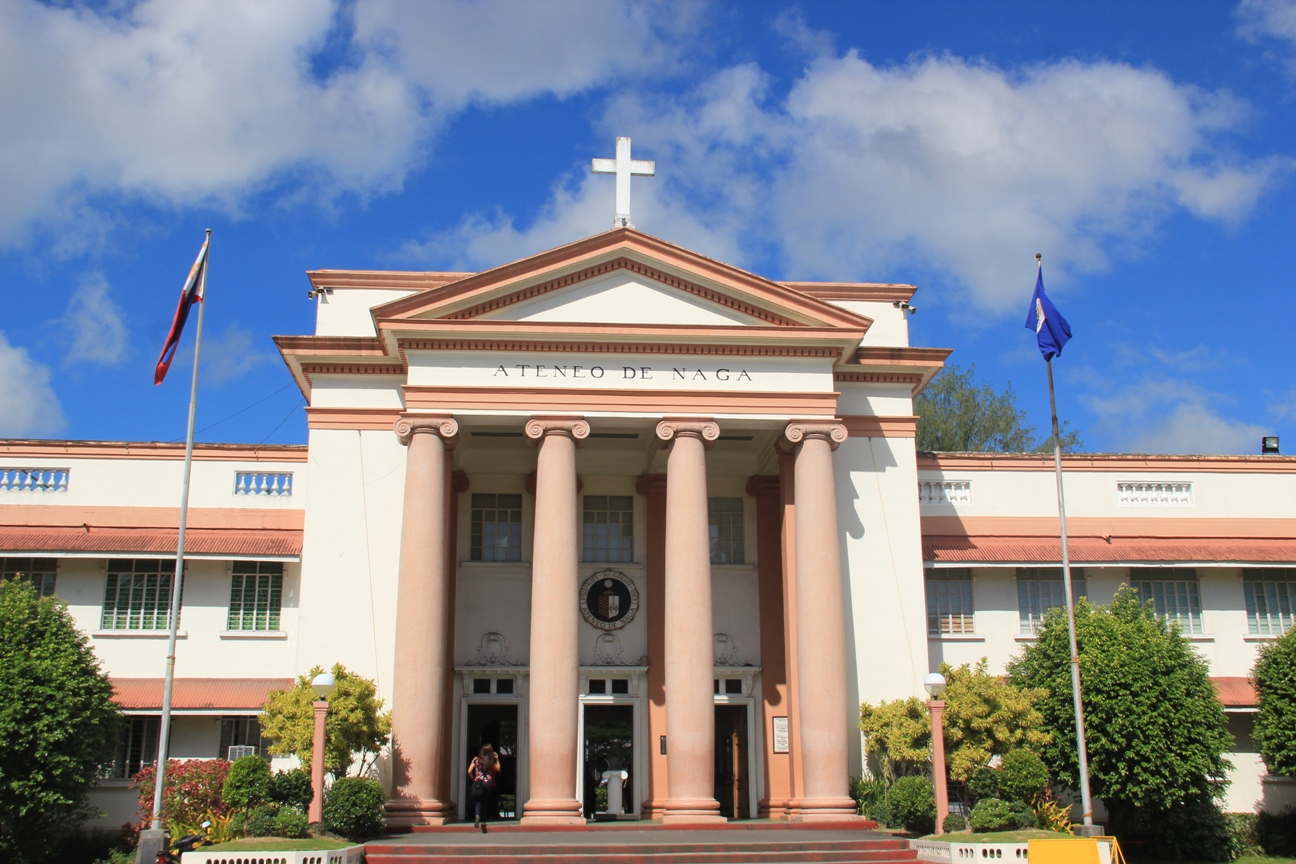
Ateneo de Naga University

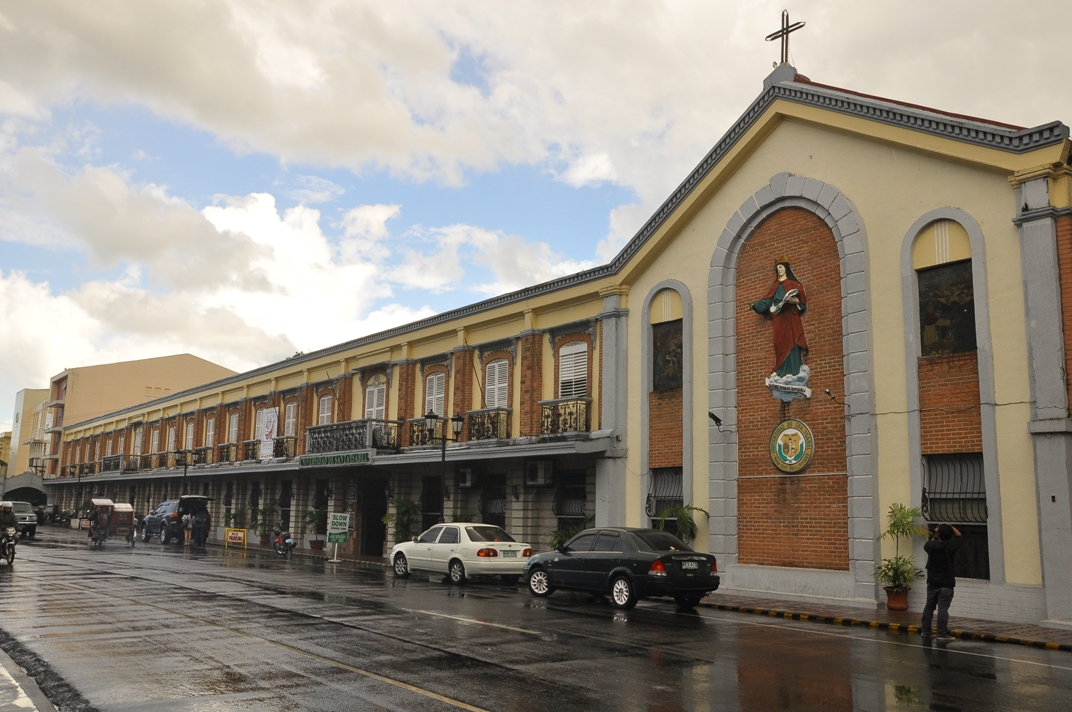
Universidad de Santa Isabel

Ateneo de Naga University is a Jesuit university and the largest Catholic university in the Bicol Region. The school has been accredited by PAASCU since 1979 and is the first university in the Philippines to achieve PAASCU Institutional Accreditation, on top of its Autonomous and Level III status. It is a "center of excellence" in teacher education, and a center of development in business administration, entrepreneurship, and information technology. It has produced animators for the country since it launched its bachelor's degree in animation.

The Universidad de Santa Isabel was inaugurated on April 12, 1869, as a private Catholic university owned and run by the Daughters of Charity and is the "first normal school for women in the Philippines and Southeast Asia and the Heritage and Historical University of Bicol". It was established by six sisters of the order who arrived in the Bicol Region on April 4, 1868, with the Bishop of Caceres, Francisco Gainza, O.P., the founder of Colegio de Santa Isabel.

University of Nueva Caceres was the very first university in Bicol, and is considered to be largest in the region, due to its attendance and size, that offers courses from kindergarten to graduate school. Founded by Dr. Jaime Hernandez in 1948, it has grown to become one of the leading institutions of higher learning in the Philippines. All course offerings are recognized by the government, and the colleges of Arts and Sciences, Education, and Commerce are accredited by the Philippine Association of Colleges and Universities Commission on Accreditation (PACU-COA). Its College of Engineering and Architecture is now one of the few regional centers for technological education in the Philippines.

Technical colleges in the city include the Bicol State College of Applied Sciences and Technology (Southeast Asian University of Technology), Naga College Foundation, Mariner's Polytechnic Colleges Foundation, AMA Computer College, and STI College. Specialized computer schools include Worldtech Resources Institute (WRI), among others.

The country's oldest live-in Christian higher educational institute for the clergy was established in the city in the early part of the 18th century. The Holy Rosary Seminary (El Seminario del Santissimo Rosario), a Roman Catholic seminary run by the Archdiocese of Caceres, has produced 22 bishops, including the first Filipino bishop, Jorge Barlin, and the first Filipino cardinal to work in the Roman Curia, Jose Tomas Sanchez. The seminary has contributed, as well, to the national heritage, through José María Panganiban, Tomás Arejola, and seven of the Fifteen Martyrs of Bicol. On January 29, 1988, the National Historical Institute declared the Holy Rosary Seminary a National Historical Landmark.

=== Secondary and primary education ===
The government-run Camarines Sur National High School, which was established in 1902, registers over 10,000 enrollees every school year, and it is the biggest secondary school in the region. Among other secondary schools in the city is the Tinago National High School.

Naga City Science High School was established in Naga in 1994. It has pilot curricula, including the Spanish curriculum, which is the third one in the Philippines, and the journalism curriculum, which allows students to receive training and exposure to college-level situations. The school is consistently a champion at the Doon Po Sa Amin national documentary contest.

Two schools in the city, Saint Joseph School (SJS) and Naga Hope Christian School (NHCS), cater to Filipino-Chinese students.

Naga Parochial School (NPS) is the largest parochial school in the region; it receives 850 enrollees yearly. It is run by priests of the Archdiocese of Caceres. It is the first PAASCU-accredited parochial school in the Philippines. Some members of the clergy (63 as of 2007 with 3 bishops) assigned to the city are alumni of the school. Well-known personalities—such as the late Raul Roco, Jesse Robredo, Francis Garchitorena, Luis Villafuerte, Jaime Fabregas, Jonathan Dela Paz Zaens, Archbishop Adolfo Tito Yllana, and Bishop Jose Rojas—are graduates of NPS.

Private schools—such as Arborvitae Plains Montessori, Inc.; Naga City Montessori School; and the Village Montessori School—can be found in the city. Tutorial and review centers for higher education are also found in the city.

== Media ==
=== Television networks ===
All of the major television broadcasting channels' regional offices are located in the city. TV5 Network Inc.'s TV5 airs shows via channel 2 and 22 (both affiliates), GMA Network's channel 7 and GTV channel 28. ABS-CBN TV-11 Naga, ceased operations amid the COVID-19 pandemic, and channel 11 was back on-air and now as ALLTV2.

=== Cable/satellite TV, ISPs, Telcos and Cellular Networks ===
The city's cable and satellite TV companies include South Luzon Cable and DCTV Cable Network Naga (Formerly SkyCable Naga).

Internet service providers and Telcos include Globe, PLDT/Smart, DITO, Converge, and DCTV. 5G is available in selected areas.

=== Radio stations ===
Naga has a number of FM and AM radio stations, some of which operate 24 hours daily.

== Notable personalities ==
- Johnny Abarrientos – a Philippine basketball player who played in the PBA from 1993 to 2010. He is currently serving as an assistant coach of the team Barangay Ginebra San Miguel
- Tomás Arejola – was a Filipino lawyer, legislator, diplomat, political writer and a propagandist during the Spanish colonial period.
- Joker Arroyo – was a statesman and key figure in the EDSA People Power Revolution which evicted then-president Ferdinand Marcos and his family from office. He also served as Congressman of Makati for 9 years, and a member of the Senate for 12 years
- Wally Bayola – is a Filipino comedian, actor, and TV host of Eat Bulaga!
- Ely Buendia – whose real name is Eleandre Basiño Buendia. He is a Filipino singer, frontman of Eraserheads and Pupil
- Jose Fabian Cadiz – was a Filipino politician and vice mayor of Marikina.
- Dave Capucao – Filipino Catholic Bishop and the fifth Prelate of Infanta
- AJ Dee – whose real name is Angel James Dee III, is an actor and an international competitive swimmer, like his younger brother Enchong Dee.
- Enchong Dee – whose real name is Ernest Lorenzo Velasquez Dee, is an actor, director and model, and an international competitive swimmer. He is a contract artist of ABS-CBN and has won numerous awards for his work in movies and television.
- Andrew E – Filipino singer and rapper
- Amalia Fuentes – was a Filipina actress
- Kyle Negrito – Filipina professional volleyball player
- Victor Dennis T. Nierva – poet, teacher, journalist, theatre actor, translator, graphic and book designer.
- Salvador Panelo – former spokesman and chief legal counsel of President Rodrigo Duterte; practicing lawyer known for representing controversial figures.
- Jesse Robredo – was a Filipino statesman and former mayor of Naga. Robredo was able to transform Naga from being dull and lethargic to being one of the "Most Improved Cities in Asia", as cited by Asiaweek Magazine in 1999. During his time in city hall, Robredo was credited for "dramatically improved stakeholdership and people
- Leni Robredo – current mayor of Naga, wife of Jesse Robredo, former congresswoman of the Third District of Camarines Sur (2013–16), and the 14th Vice President of the Philippines.
- Bembol Roco – Filipino actor
- Raul Roco – was a political figure in the Philippines. He was the standard-bearer of Aksyon Demokratiko, which he founded in 1997 as a vehicle for his presidential bids in 1998 and 2004. He was a then senator and secretary of the Department of Education under the presidency of Gloria Macapagal Arroyo.
- Tecla San Andres Ziga – female senator in the Philippines notable for being the first woman in the country to top the bar examination for law-degree graduates.
- Adolfo Tito Yllana – catholic Archbishop serving as Apostolic Nuncio to Israel and Cyprus, and Apostolic Delegate to Jerusalem and Palestine

Other personalities include:

- Baron Geisler, whose mother hails from Naga
- Jomari Yllana, whose parents hail from Naga

== Gallery ==
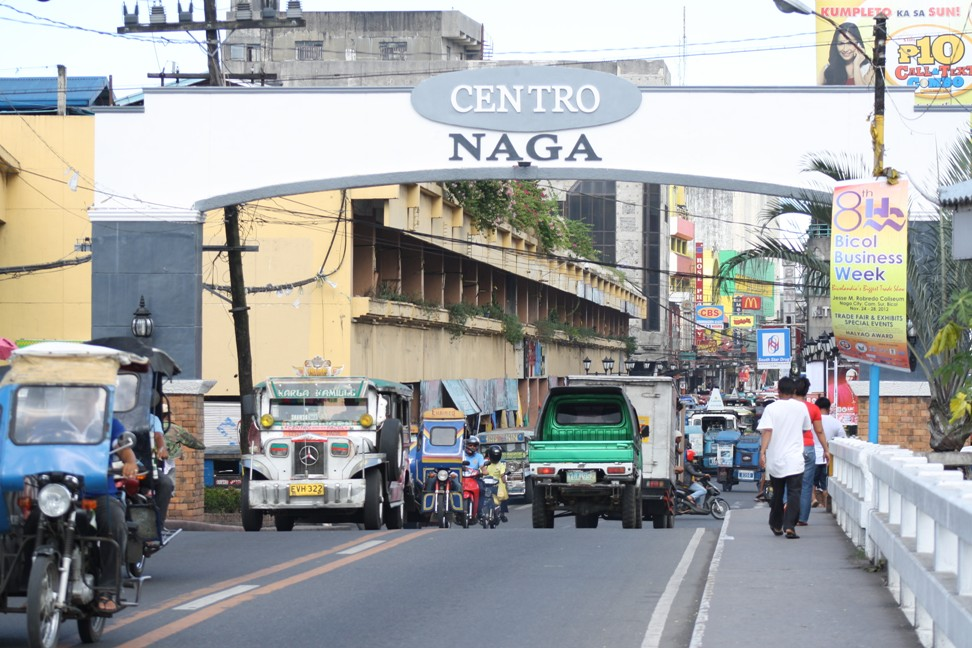
Downtown Naga

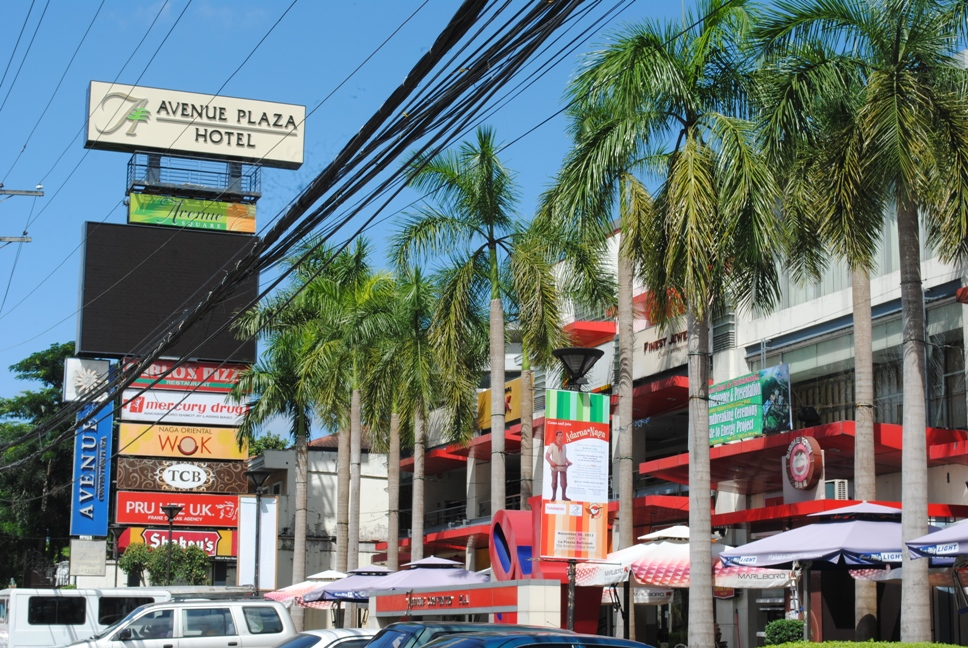
Avenue Square

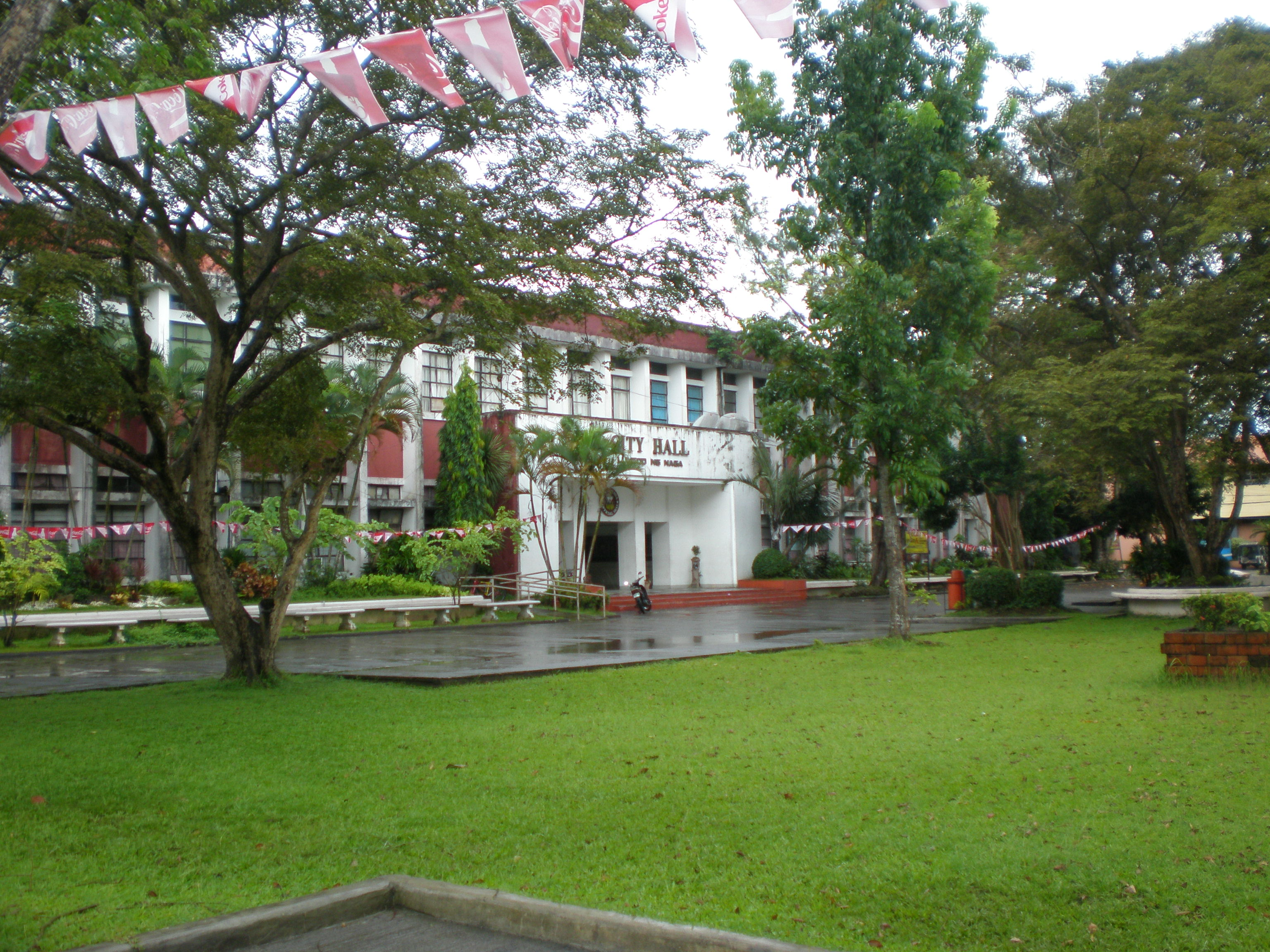
Naga City Hall

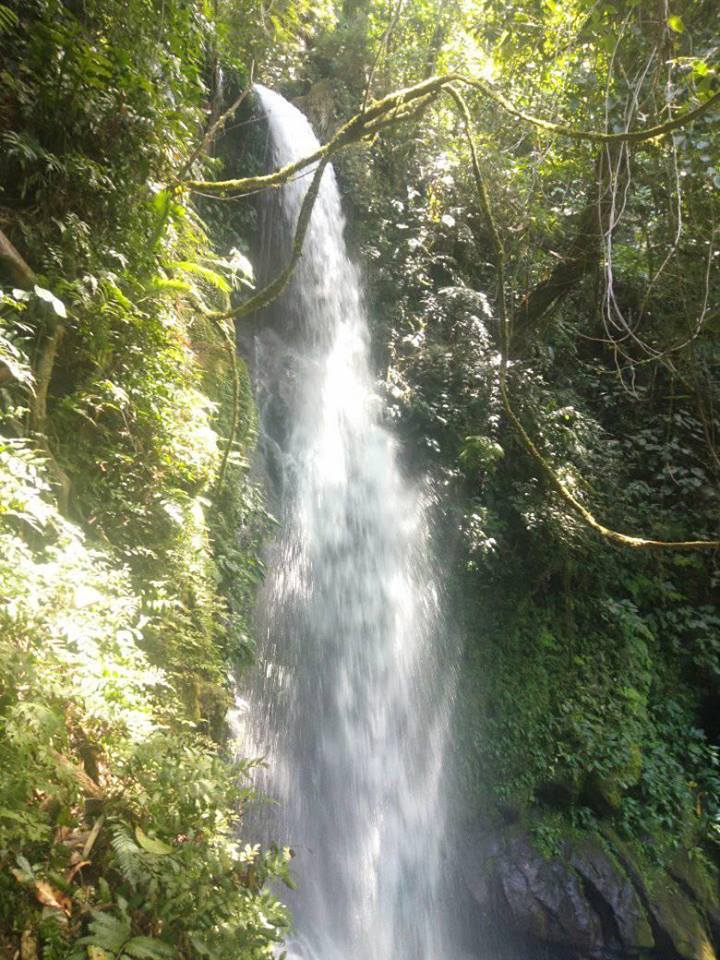
Malabsay falls at Mt. Isarog, Panicuason

== Sister cities ==
=== Local ===
- (Philippines) Bacolod
- (Philippines) Cotabato City
- (Philippines) General Santos
- (Philippines) Iloilo City
- (Philippines) Lucena
- (Philippines) Makati
- (Philippines) Ozamiz
- (Philippines) Parañaque
- (Philippines) Quezon City
- (Philippines) San Fernando, Pampanga
- (Philippines) Vigan, Ilocos Sur
- (Philippines) Puerto Princesa

=== International ===
- San Leandro, California, United States
- Scranton, Pennsylvania, United States

== Local Government ==
2025-2028 Naga City Officials
| Position | Name | Party |
|---|---|---|
| Mayor | Ma. Leonor G. Robredo | Liberal |
| Vice Mayor | Gabriel H. Bordado Jr. | Liberal |
| Councilors | Elmer S. Baldemoro | Liberal |
| Councilors | Jessie R. Albeus | Liberal |
| Councilors | Ghiel G. Rosales | Liberal |
| Councilors | Vito C. Borja II | Liberal |
| Councilors | Gilda Gayle A. Gomez | Liberal |
| Councilors | Melvin Ramon G. Buenafa | Liberal |
| Councilors | Jude A. Diokno | Liberal |
| Councilors | Francisco M. Mendoza | Liberal |
| Councilors | Allan Reiz C. Macaraig | Liberal |
| Councilors | David Casper Nathan A. Sergio | Independent |
Ex Officio Municipal Council Members
| ABC President | TBD | Nonpartisan |
| SK Federation President | TBD | Nonpartisan |

== See also ==
- List of renamed cities and municipalities in the Philippines
- Roman Catholic Archdiocese of Caceres
- Bicolano People
- List of Bicol Region Cities and Municipalities
