= Peñafrancia =

Peñafrancia may refer to the following topics in the Philippines:

- Peñafrancia Basilica, a Roman Catholic church in the city of Naga, Camarines Sur
  - Our Lady of Peñafrancia, an image of the Virgin Mary housed in the basilica and patron saint of the city of Naga and the Bicol Region
- Our Lady of Peñafrancia Shrine, a Roman Catholic church in the city of Naga, Camarines Sur and former home of Our Lady of Peñafrancia
- Peñafrancia, Naga, a barangay in the city of Naga, Camarines Sur
