= Francisco Gaínza =

The Most Reverend Francisco Gaínza O.P.
- Bishop of Nueva Caceres
- Diocese: Nueva Caceres
- In office: 25 September 1862 – 31 July 1879
- Predecessor: Manuel Grijalvo y Mínguez
- Successor: Casimiro Herrero y Pérez

Orders
- Ordination: 18 September 1841
- Consecration: 22 February 1863 by Gregorio Melitón Martínez Santa Cruz

Personal details
- Born: 3 June 1818 Calahorra, Kingdom of Castile, Spanish Empire
- Died: 31 July 1879 (aged 61)

Francisco Caracciolo Urreta Visayas de Gainza (3 June 1818 – 31 July 1879) was the 25th bishop of the Diocese of Cáceres. He was born in the city of Calahorra, in the province of Logroño, Spain.

He studied in the Philippines and lived in Manila. In Manila, he was a professor at the Colegio of Santo Tomas. Gaínza and his friend, Father Pedro Peláez from Laguna, were leaders of the secularization movement, seeking reforms within the Catholic Church to respect the rights of the secular clergy, who were mostly natives, in parishes. Together with Peláez, in 1861, he founded El Católico Filipino, the first Catholic newspaper in the Philippines.

In March 1862, Gaínza was appointed the bishop of the Diocese of Nueva Cáceres. After Peláez's death from the 3 June 1863 earthquake, Gaínza dispelled rumors of Peláez's unfulfilled plans of rebellion against Spain.

On September 1, 1864, Gainza initiated the Traslación Procession on the Friday before the Feast of the Most Holy Name of Mary, where the image was brought from the Our Lady of Peñafrancia Shrine to the cathedral for a solemn novena, starting the Peñafrancia festival.

== Books and publications ==
- Memoria sobre Neuva Vizcaya (1849)
- Memoria y antecedentes sobre las espediciones de Balanguingui y Joló (1851)
- Informe sobre La Aclimatacion De La Pimienta en la Isla De Balabac (1858)
- Últimas noticias de la misiones españolas del Tonkin : estractadas [sic] de la correspondencia, recibida de los S.S. Vicarios Apostólicos, Vicarios Provinciales y Misioneros Dominicos (1860)
- Carta pastoral que el Ilmo. y Rmo. Sr. Dr. D. Fr. Francisco Gainza, del Sagrado Orden de Predicadores, Obispo de Nueva Cáceres, dirige a sus muy amados diocesanos con motivo de su consagración (1863)
- Instrucción pastoral sobre negociación prohibida a los eclesiásticos de Ultramar (1864)
- Estatutos del seminario conciliar de nueva cáceres : reglamento de asistencias á la Santa Catedral (1865)
- Estatutos para la Escuela-Colegio de Santa Isabel de la ciudad de Nueva Cáceres (1865)
- An simbahan can satong Señora nin Peña de Francia sa ciudad nin Nueva Caceres sa caporoan na Filipinas an Gñaran (1867)
- Casaysayan can mahal na pasion Jesucristo cagurangnanta, na sucat ipaglaad nin pusó nin siisay nan na magbasa, ipinabicol nin Samong Amang mamomóton na Fr. Francisco Gainza (1868)
- Gramática latina para uso de la juventud filipina por el Excmo. é Ilmo (1873)
- Casaysayan can mahal na pasion Jesucristo cagurangnanta, na sucat ipaglaad nin pusó nin siisay nan na magbasa, ipinabicol nin Samong Amang mamomóton na Fr. Francisco Gainza (1877)
- Milagros y novena de la Santísima Virgen del Rosario, patrona universal de las Islas Filipinas, que se venera in el Templo de Santo Domingo de Manila (1885)
- Novena nin sacratisima Virgen del Cármen Maria santísma ina nin Dios asin cagu-rangnan niato (1886)

== Bibliography ==
- Bikol Annals. Domingo Abella. 1954. p. 171-180.
- "The Diocesan Seminary". Sarong artikulo sinurat ni Agapito Sacristan, C.M., Rector, na nagluwas sa Peñafrancia Official Souvenir Program (Sept. 1941).
- An retrato niya sinapi' sa libro ni Abella na Bikol Annals asin pinadakula sa kompyuter.
