= Bicolano people =

Ethnic group of the eastern Philippines

Mga Bikolnon
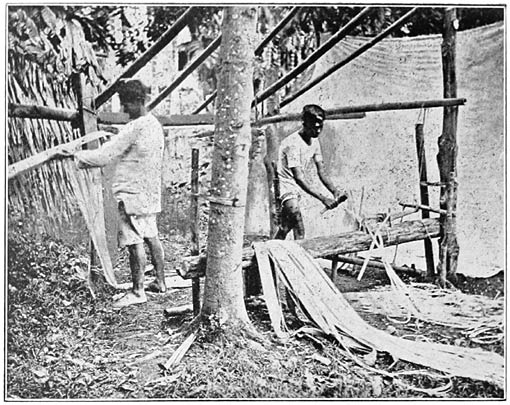
- Bicolanos preparing Manila hemp

Total population
- 7,079,814 (2020 census) (6.5% of the Philippine population)

Regions with significant populations
- Philippines (Bicol Region, Quezon Province, Northern Samar, Metro Manila, Davao Region, Caraga Region, Soccsksargen, Misamis Oriental) Significant diaspora in: United States; Canada; United Kingdom; Australia; New Zealand; Singapore; United Arab Emirates

Languages
- Native; Bikol languages Also; Visayan languages (particularly Waray, Masbatenyo and Cebuano) • Bisakol • Filipino • English

Religion
- Predominantly; Christianity (majority Roman Catholicism • minority Aglipayan and Protestantism); Also; Animism, indigenous folk religion

Related ethnic groups
- Tagalogs, Visayans (Masbateños and Warays), other Filipinos

The Bicolano people (Bikol: Mga Bikolnon) are the fourth-largest Filipino ethnolinguistic group. Their native region is commonly referred to as Bicol, which comprises the entirety of the Bicol Peninsula and neighboring minor islands, all in the southeast portion of Luzon. Men from the region are often referred to as Bicolano, while Bicolana may be used to refer to women.

Bicolano people are largely agricultural and rural people, producing rice, coconuts, hemp, and spices. A great majority of Bicolanos are Roman Catholics, with many towns celebrating festivals in honor of patron saints, and Catholic Mass being celebrated daily in many of the Bicol region's churches. There also exist minority Protestant and Muslim populations among Bicolano people. An undercurrent of animism persists as well; for instance, it is common for Bicolano people to believe that whenever a supernatural entity stalks a house, they will leave centavo coins as compensation.

Bicolano people speak about a dozen closely related dialects of Bikol, largely differentiated according to cities, and closely related to other central Philippines languages, all of which belong to the Austronesian (specifically Malayo-Polynesian) superfamily of languages.

== History ==
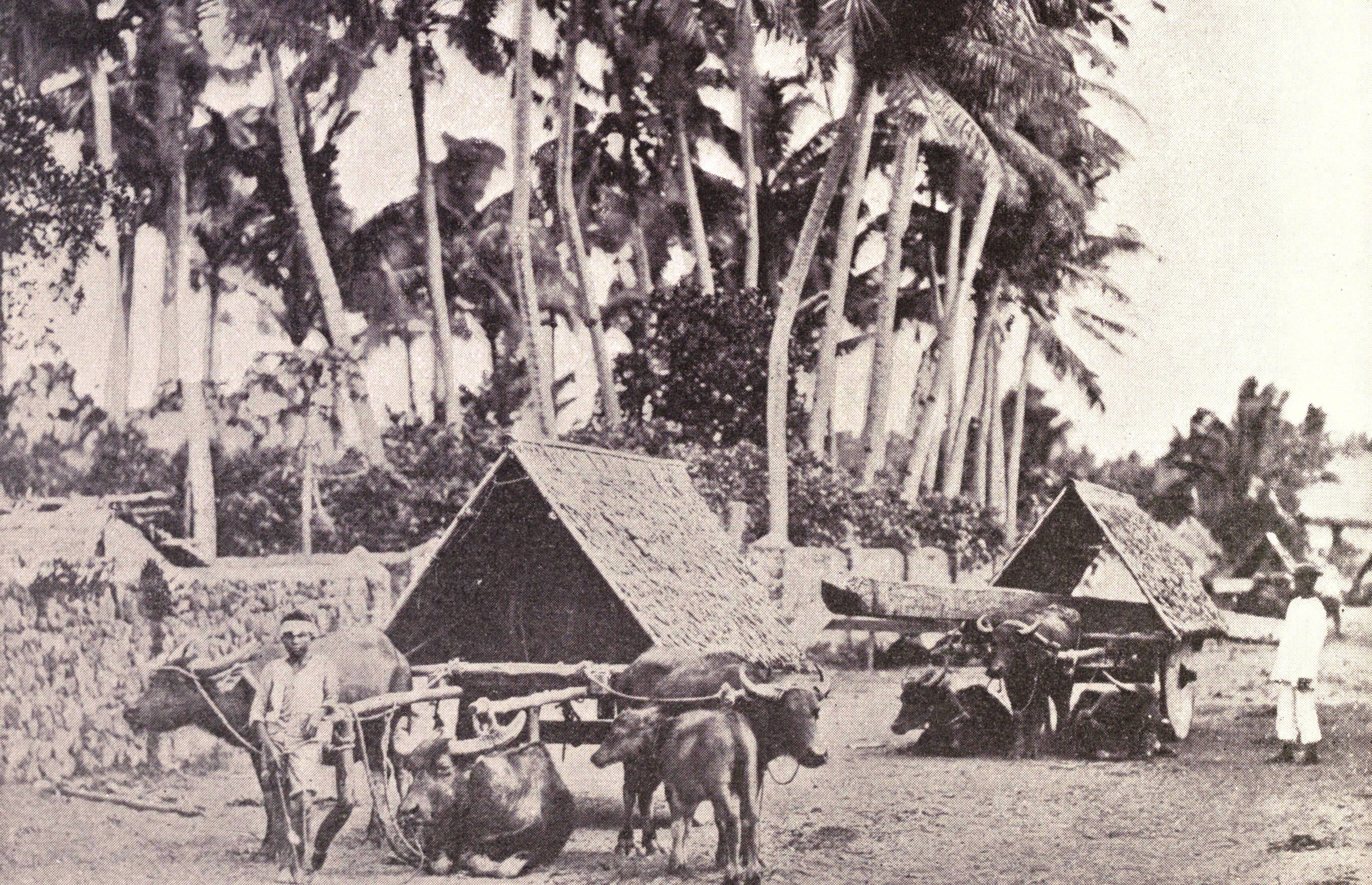
Bicolano men with their wagons, from Albay, c. 1899.

According to a folk epic entitled Ibalong, the people of the region were formerly called Ibalong or Ibalnong, a name believed to have been derived from Gat Ibal who ruled Sawangan (now the city of Legazpi) in ancient times. Ibalong used to mean the "people of Ibal"; eventually, this was shortened to Ibalon. The word Bikol, which replaced Ibalon, was originally bikod (meaning "meandering"), a word which supposedly described the principal river of that area.

Archaeological diggings, dating back to as early as the Neolithic, and accidental findings resulting from the mining industry, road-building and railway projects in the region, reveal that the Bicol mainland is a rich storehouse of ceramic artifacts. Burial cave findings also point to the pre-Hispanic practice of using burial jars.

The Spanish influence in Bicol resulted mainly from the efforts of Augustinian and Franciscan Spanish missionaries. Through the Franciscans, the annual feast of the Virgin of Peñafrancia, the Patroness for Bicolandia, was started. The Catholic priest Miguel Robles asked a local artist to carve a replica of the statue of the Virgin in Salamanca; now the statue is celebrated through an annual fluvial parade in Naga City.

The flag of the members of Katipunan in Bicol.

Bicolanos actively participated in the national resistance to the Spanish, American and Japanese occupations, led by two well-known militants, Simeón Ola and Governor Wenceslao Vinzons. Historically, the Bicolano people have been among the most resistant to foreign occupation, and the region was very hard for the central government to control until the end of World War II.

== Area ==
Bicolanos live in the Bicol Region, which occupies the southeastern part of Luzon, now containing the provinces of Albay, Camarines Norte, Camarines Sur, Catanduanes and Sorsogon and Masbate (although the majority of Masbate's population are a subgroup of Visayans). Many Bicolanos also live in the southeastern towns of the Calabarzon province of Quezon and in Metro Manila. Bicolanos also live outside Luzon, particularly in Northern Samar in Visayas (due to its proximity to Bicolandia) and Davao Region, Misamis Oriental, Caraga and Soccsksargen in Mindanao.

== Demographics ==
Bicolanos numbered 6,082,165 in 2020. They are descended from Austronesian peoples who came from Taiwan during the Iron Age. Many Bicolanos also have some Han Chinese, Arab, and Spanish admixtures; most of the townsfolk have small traces of each heritage. Bicolanos have a high percentage of Spanish introgression; a government-sponsored study show that 20 percent of the population have Hispanic ancestry. Bicolanos are also the ethnic group with the second largest amount of Spaniards/Hispanics as a percentage of the population, after Chavacanos.

Like any other ethnic groups from Luzon, Bicolanos are also widely dispersed outside their regional homeland. As of 2000, they make up the largest non-Tagalog group in the following cities of Metro Manila: Caloocan City, 59,276 or 5.05% of the city’s population; Pasig City, 24,678 or 4.9%; and Valenzuela City, 21,896 or 4.55%. In Quezon City, they rank second in population size after the Visayans, numbering 108,293 or 5%. In Manila, they number 39,295 or 2.5%, ranking third, after the Ilocano and Cebuano. They are the largest non-Tagalog group in the following provinces of Luzon: Rizal, 73,253 or 4.30%; Laguna 57,282 or 3%; and Batangas 11,661 or 0.42%. They rank second after the Visayans in the following provinces: Cavite, 52,031 or 2.54%, Bulacan 43,605 or 1.95%, and Quezon, 36,339 or 2.45%. They are found as well in the following provinces: Aurora, 7,079; Pampanga 6,685; Oriental Mindoro, 2,930; 247 in Marinduque; and in Cebu 1,534, which is 0.06% of the population. In just this random survey, the Bikol people make up a total of 545,544 or more than half a million, residing outside their region of origin. On the other hand, other ethnolinguistic groups in the Bicol region, besides the Tagalog, are the Visayans, particularly the Cebuano and Ilonggo; and the Kankanaey from northern Luzon. Bicolanos are also found as a minority in Mindanao, especially in the Davao Region.

== Culture and traits ==
=== Cuisine ===
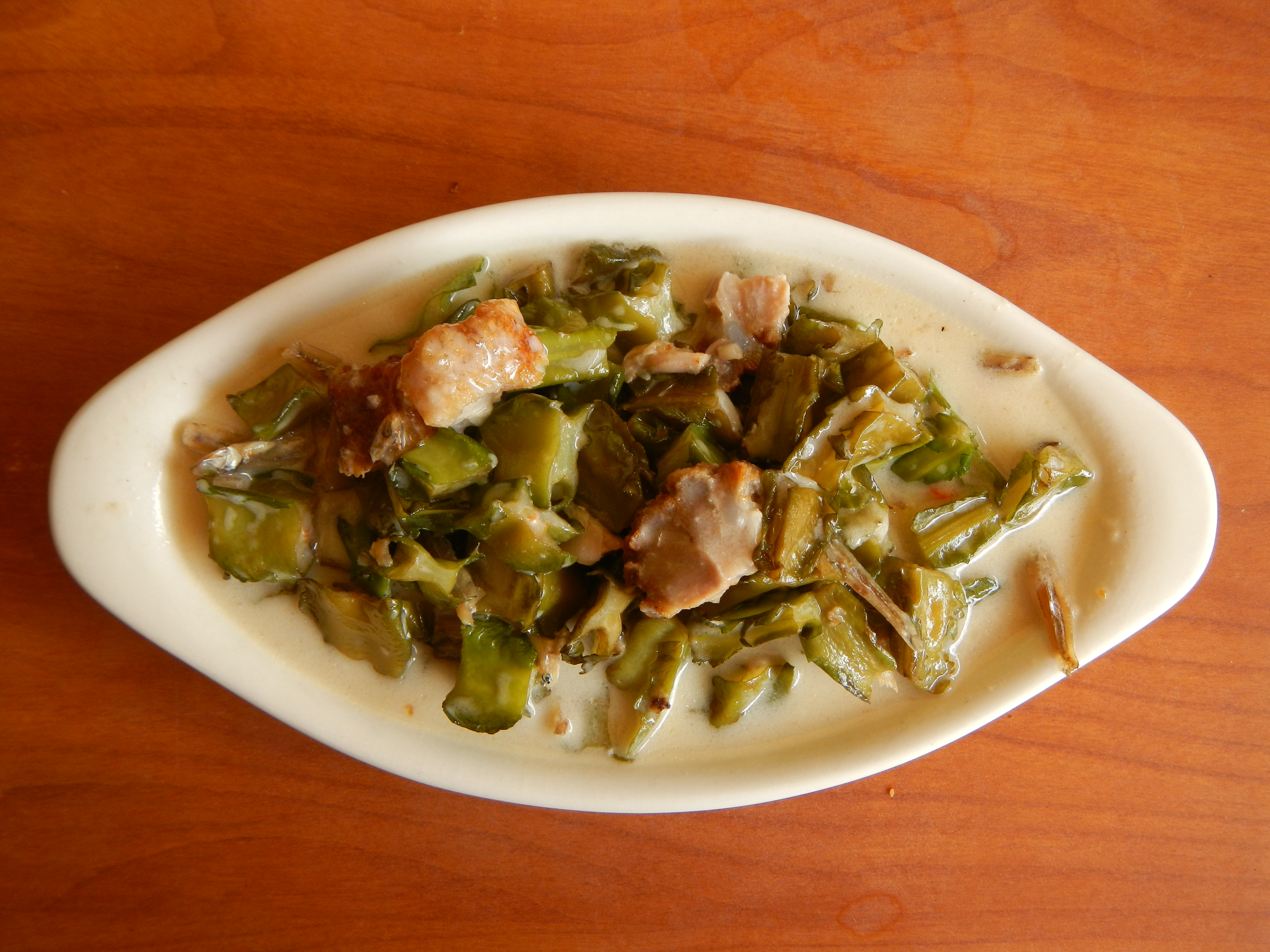
Ginataang sigarilyas, a notable Bicolano dish of winged bean (sigarilyas) cooked in coconut milk (gata) with pork and anchovies.

Bicolanos supposedly have a high tolerance for eating chili food or foods which are highly spiced. The Bicolano cuisine is primarily noted for the prominent use of chili peppers and gata (coconut milk) in its food. A classic example is gulay na lada, known outside the region as Bicol express, a well-loved dish using siling labuyo (native small chilies) and coconut milk. Meals are generally rich in carbohydrates, and vegetables are almost always cooked in coconut milk; meat recipes include pochero, adobo, tapa and dinuguan. Commonly eaten fish are mackerel and anchovy; in Lake Buhi, the sinarapan or tabyos (known as the smallest fish in the world) is common.

=== Livelihood ===
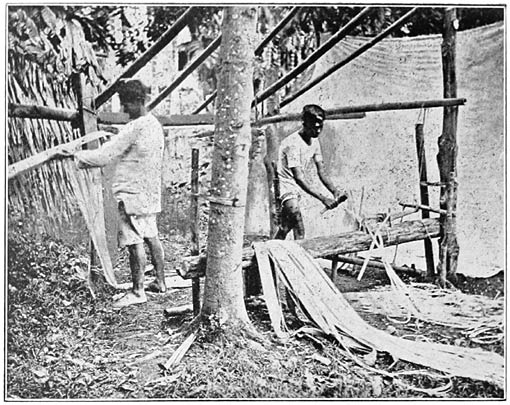
Bicolano men preparing hemp by drawing out its fibers, c. 1900

Copra processing and abacá stripping are generally done by hand. Fishing is also an important industry, and the supply of fish is normally abundant from May through September. Organized commercial fishing makes use of costly nets and motor-powered and electric-lighted boats or launches called palakaya or basnigan. Individual fishermen, on the other hand, commonly use two types of nets – the basnig and the pangki, as well as the chinchoro, buliche and sarap. In Lake Buhi, the sarap and sumbiling are used; the small fishes caught through the former is the sinarapan. The bunuan (corral) of the inangcla, sakag, sibid-sibid and sakag types are common. The banwit, two kinds of which are the og-og and kitang, are also used. Mining and the manufacture of various items from abaca are important industries. The former started when the Spaniards discovered the Paracale mines in Camarines Norte.

Coconut and abacá are two dollar-earning products grown in the coastal valleys, hillsides or slopes of several fertile volcanoes. The Bicol River basin or rice granary provide the peasants rice, corn, and root crops for food and a small cash surplus when crops evade the dreaded but frequent typhoons. For land preparation, carabao-drawn plough and harrow are generally used. Sickles are used for cutting rice stalks; threshing is done either by stepping on or beating the rice straws with basbas, and cleaning is done with the use of the nigo (winnowing basket).

=== Cultural values ===
As in other neighboring regions, men still expect the Bicolana women, both before and after marriage, to do the majority of household work, while Bicolano men are still expected to be the primary source of income and financial support of their family. Close family ties and religiosity are important traits for survival in the typhoon-prone physical environment. Some persisting traditional practices are the pamalaye, pantomina and tigsikan, and the people hold strong beliefs on God, the soul and life after death. Related to these, there are annual rituals like the pabasa, tanggal, fiestas and flores de mayo. Side by side with these are held beliefs on spiritual beings as the tawong lipod, duwende, onglo, tambaluslos, kalag, katambay, aswang and mangkukulam.

On the whole, the value system of the Bicolanos shows the influence of Spanish religious doctrines and American materialism merged with traditional animistic beliefs. Consequently, it is a multicultural system that evolved through the years to accommodate the realities of the erratic climate in a varied geographical setting. Such traits can be gleaned from numerous folk tales and folk songs that abound, the most known of which is the Sarung Banggi. The heroic stories reflect such traits as kindness, a determination to conquer evil forces, resourcefulness and courage. Folk songs come in the form of awit, sinamlampati, panayokyok, panambitan, hatol, pag-omaw, rawit-dawit and children's song and chants.

To suit the tropical climate, Bicolanos use light material for their houses; others now have bungalows to withstand the impact of strong typhoons. Light, western-styled clothes are predominantly used now. The typical Bicolano wears light, western-styled clothes similar to those of other Filipinos in urban centers. Seldom, if ever, do Bicolanos weave sinamay or piña for clothing as in the past; sinamay is reserved now for pillow cases, mosquito nets, fishing nets, bags and other decorative items.

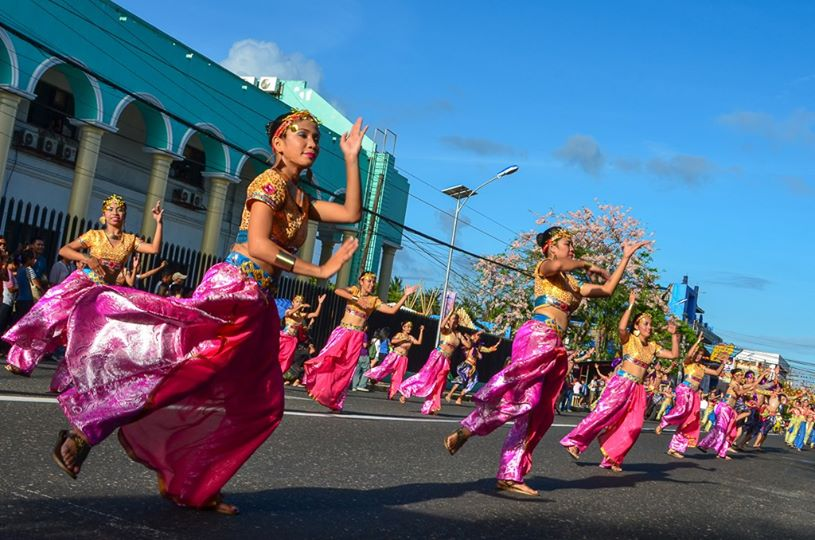
Bicolanos celebrating the Magayon Festival. The festival is held in Albay, where the Mayon Volcano is located, every May.

Bicolanos observe an annual festival in honor of the Our Lady of Peñafrancia on the third Sunday of September. The City of Naga comes alive. During the celebration, a jostling crowd of all-male devotees carries the image of the Virgin on their shoulders to the Naga Metropolitan Cathedral, while shouting Viva La Virgen! For the next nine days people, mostly Bicolanos, come for an annual visit, light candles and kiss the cult image of the Virgin. To the Bicolanos, this affair is religious and cultural as well. Every night, shows are held at the plaza the year's biggest cockfights take place, bicycle races are held and the river, a lively boat race precedes the fluvial procession. At noon of the third Saturday of the month, the devotees carry the image on their shoulders in procession to the packed waterfront. On the ninth day of the festivities, The Virgin of Peñafrancia is brought to her home, to the Minor Basilica of the Our Lady of Peñafrancia via a grand fluvial procession in the Naga River. This celebration of the Bicolanos is considered one of the largest Marian celebrations in Asia.

=== Immortals ===
- Gugurang: the supreme god; causes the pit of Mayon volcano to rumble when he is displeased; cut Mt. Malinao in half with a thunderbolt; the god of good (whose name also means "the old one")
- Asuang: brother of Gugurang; an evil god who wanted Gugurang's fire, and gathered evil spirits and advisers to cause immortality and crime to reign; vanquished by Gugurang but his influence still lingers
- Assistants of Gugurang
  - Linti: controls lightning
  - Dalogdog: controls thunder
- Unnamed Giant: supports the world; movement from his index finger causes a small earthquake, while movement from his third finger causes strong ones; if he moves his whole body, the earth will be destroyed
- Languiton: the god of the sky
- Tubigan: the god of the water
- Dagat: goddess of the sea
- Paros: god of the wind; married to Dagat
- Daga: son of Dagat and Paros; inherited his father's control of the wind; instigated an unsuccessfully rebellion against his grandfather, Languit, and died; his body became the earth
- Adlao: Embodiment of the Sun and heat son of Dagat and Paros; joined Daga's rebellion; his body became the sun; in another myth, during a battle, he cut one of Bulan's arm and hit Bulan's eyes, where the arm was flattened and became the earth, while Bulan's tears became the rivers and seas
- Bulan: god of the pale moon son of Dagat and Paros; joined Daga's rebellion and; his body became the moon; in another myth, he was alive and from his cut arm, the earth was established, and from his tears, the rivers and seas were established
- Bitoon: daughter of Dagat and Paros; accidentally killed by Languit during a rage against his grandsons' rebellion; her shattered body became the stars
- Unnamed God: a sun god who fell in love with the mortal, Rosa; refused to light the world until his father consented to their marriage; he afterwards visited Rosa, but forgetting to remove his powers over fire, he accidentally burned Rosa's whole village until nothing but hot springs remained
- Magindang: the god of fishing who leads fishermen in getting a good fish catch through sounds and signs
- Okot: the forest god whose whistle would lead hunters to their prey
- Bakunawa: a serpent that seeks to swallow the moon
- Haliya: the goddess of the moon
- Batala: a good god who battled against Kalaon
- Kalaon: an evil god of destruction
- Son of Kalaon: son of Kalaon who defied his evil father's wishes
- Onos: freed the great flood that changed the land's features
- Oryol: a wily serpent who appeared as a beautiful maiden with a seductive voice; admired the hero Handyong's bravery and gallantry, leading her to aid the hero in clearing the region of beasts until peace came into the land

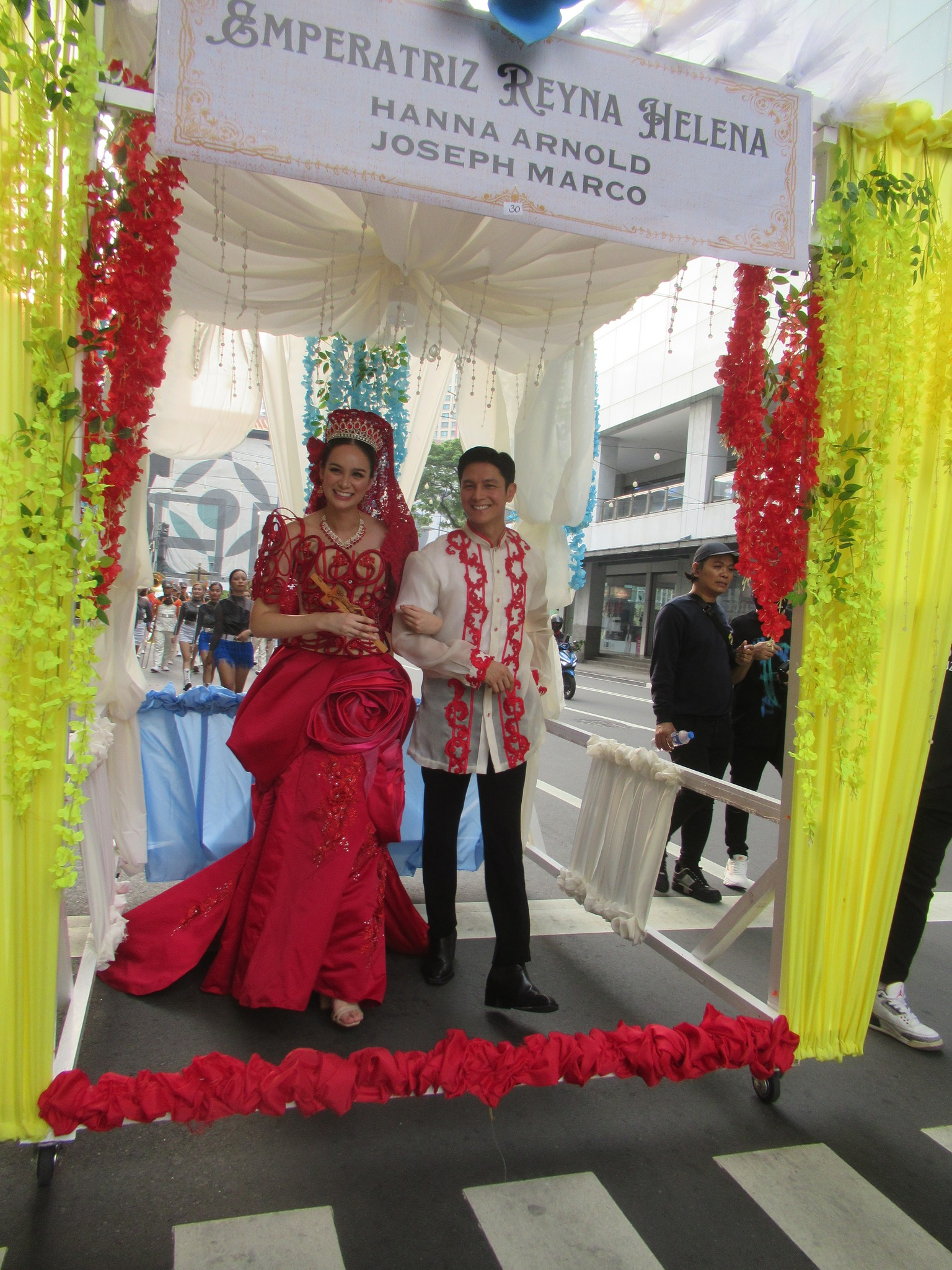
Hannah Arnold (beauty queen), pride of Bicolanos

=== Mortals ===
- Baltog: the hero who slew the giant wild boar Tandayag
- Handyong: the hero who cleared the land of beasts with the aid of Oryol; crafted the people's first laws, which created a period for a variety of human inventions
- Bantong: the hero who single-handedly slew the half-man half-beast Rabot
- Dinahong: the first potter; a pygmy who taught the people how to cook and make pottery
- Ginantong: made the first plow, harrow, and other farming tools
- Hablom: the inventor of the first weaving loom and bobbins
- Kimantong: the first person to fashion the rudder called timon, the sail called layag, the plow called arado, the harrow called surod, the ganta and other measures, the roller, the yoke, the bolo, and the hoe
- Sural: the first person to have thought of a syllabary; carved the first writing on a white rock-slab from Libong
- Gapon: polished the rock-slab where the first writing was on
- Takay: a lovely maiden who drowned during the great flood; transformed into the water hyacinth in Lake Bato
- Rosa: a sun god's lover, who perished after the sun god accidentally burned her entire village

== Notable Bicolanos ==
- Leni Robredo, a lawyer, stateswoman and politician who has been serving as the 18th mayor of Naga since 2025, having previously served as the 14th vice president of the Philippines from 2016 to 2022 under President Rodrigo Duterte. And a widow of late DILG Secretary Jessie Robredo.
- Hannah Arnold, a beauty pageant titleholder who was crowned Binibining Pilipinas International 2021. She represented the Philippines at the Miss International 2022 pageant and finished in the top 15.

== See also ==
- Tagalog people
- Kapampangan people
- Ilocano people
- Ivatan people
- Igorot people
- Pangasinan people
- Negrito
- Visayan people
  - Cebuano people
    - Boholano people
  - Hiligaynon people
  - Waray people
- Lumad
- Lowland Christian Filipinos
- Moro people
