= Lowland Christian Filipinos =

Christian-majority ethnolinguistic groups in the lowland Philippines

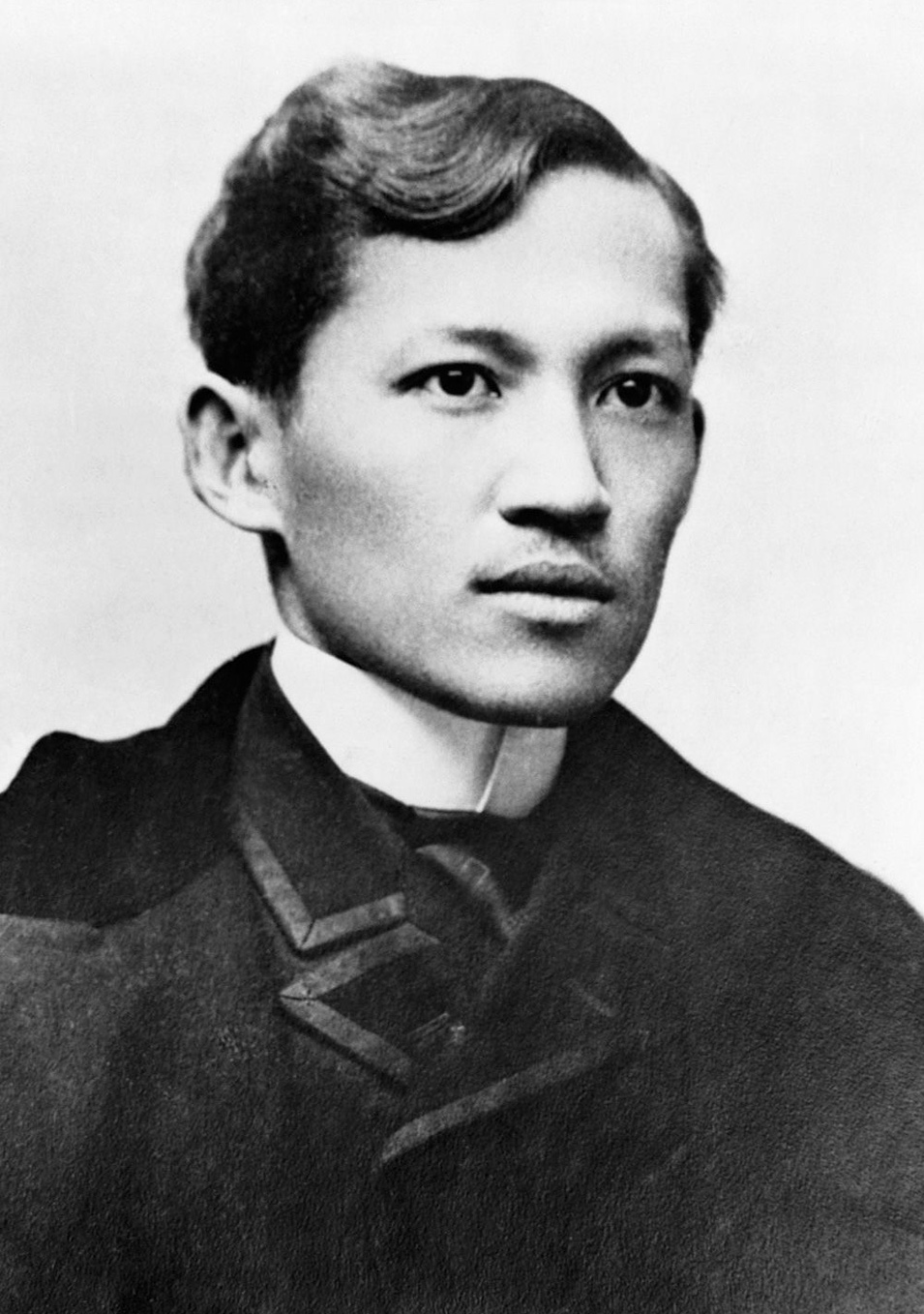
- Jose Rizal, a Filipino nationalist from the Lowland Christian Tagalog people

Regions with significant populations
- Philippines, United States

Languages
- Tagalog, Cebuano, Waray, Kapampangan, Bicolano, Hiligaynon, Ilocano

Religion
- Catholicism, minority Protestantism

Lowland Christian Filipinos is a collective term used by scholars for the Christianized lowland communities in the Philippines, encompassing multiple ethnolinguistic groups. They share elements of their histories, cultures and religions. together these communities constitute the majority of the Philippine population. Lowland Christian ethnolinguistic groups have historically been influenced by Christianity, particularly Roman Catholicism. Ethnolinguistic groups described as Lowland Christians include the Tagalog people, Ilocano people, Waray-Waray people, Bicolano people, Hiligaynon people, Cebuano people and Kapampangan people.

Early Spanish colonial administration was primarily concentrated in and around Manila, where officials and merchants of the Spanish empire were based. As a result, Spanish authorities relied heavily on the Catholic Church to administer the lowland provinces, missionaries organized rural life around the church and converted most of the populations of Luzon and the Visayas to Christianity. Before Spanish colonization, many lowland ethnolinguistic groups lived in dispersed settlements; however through the reducción policy, Spanish authorities relocated these lowland communities into centralized localities and towns.

During the Spanish colonial period, the term Indio was used by the colonial administration and Catholic Church to classify the Christianized peoples of the lowlands, while Infiel was applied to the non-Christian peoples living in the highlands. In the late 19th century, emerging Filipino nationalism identified the Indio with La Raza Filipina, a conception of nationality that often excluded many non-Christian highland communities.

== History ==
Christian missionary activity in the Philippines began primarily from the 1570s onwards. By the 1640s and 1650s, most of the lowland populations of Luzon and the Visayas had been christianized. In contrast, missionary activities among the mountainous tribes during the 17th and 18th centuries were largely unsuccessful. A severe shortage of priests in the Philippines, combined with high mortality among missionaries in the mountainous regions, led to many of these missions being abandoned, with the limited number of clergy instead assigned to the lowland parishes.

During the 17th century, one of the principal systems of rural organization employed by the Catholic Church was the cabecera-visita system. It developed in response to the lack of priests and the dispersed nature of lowlands settlements and later served as a predecessor to the barrio system. The visitas also functioned as frontier communities between the Christianized lowlands and neighbouring highland peoples. Mission stations were established in these settlements, and Spanish soldiers were stationed there to protect Lowland Christian communities from raids by non-Christian tribes.

In 1754, the governor of Pangasinan prohibited communication between the mountain tribes and Lowland Christian communities. By the mid 19th century, the lowland Indio population had reached approximately 3.7 million.

In Mindoro, repeated raids by moros led to the destruction of many Lowland Christian settlements. Following the last major Moro raid on the island in 1871, the Lowland Christian population began to recover. During the 1930s, after roads were constructed linking the provincial capital of Calapan with the towns of Pinamalayan and Bongabon, large-scale migration by Tagalogs and Ilocano settlers took place. These migrants established barrios and towns, where relations between the different ethnolinguistic groups were generally peaceful, and intermarriage was common.

== Society ==
=== Culture ===
Many animist beliefs and practices have been incorporated into Lowland Christian folk Catholicism. Fiestas and religious processions are generally held in honor of Catholic saints. All Saints’ Day observances in many Lowland Christian communities include the veneration of deceased ancestors, reflecting beliefs that ancestral spirits can influence their fortunes. Traditional healers are also found among Lowland Christian communities and are known in Tagalog as Albularyos and Espirisitas.

=== Music ===
Lowland Christian musical traditions have been influenced by Spanish Colonialism and Roman Catholicism, as well as later American influence. Lowland Christian liturgical music has also been influenced by pre-Christian traditions. These include the Panunuluyan, an outdoor drama performed on Christmas Eve that depicts Mary and Joseph's search for lodging, and concludes with the birth of Jesus. Other traditions include the Salubong, Humenta, Moriones and Senaculo. Lowland Christian Filipinos also maintain singing traditions associated with courtship, death and other secular themes.

== See also ==
- Moro People
- Indigenous peoples of the Philippines
- Ethnic groups in the Philippines
