= Our Lady of Peñafrancia Shrine =

Roman Catholic church in Naga City, Philippines

Peñafrancia Church
- Our Lady of Peñafrancia Parish (Old Shrine)
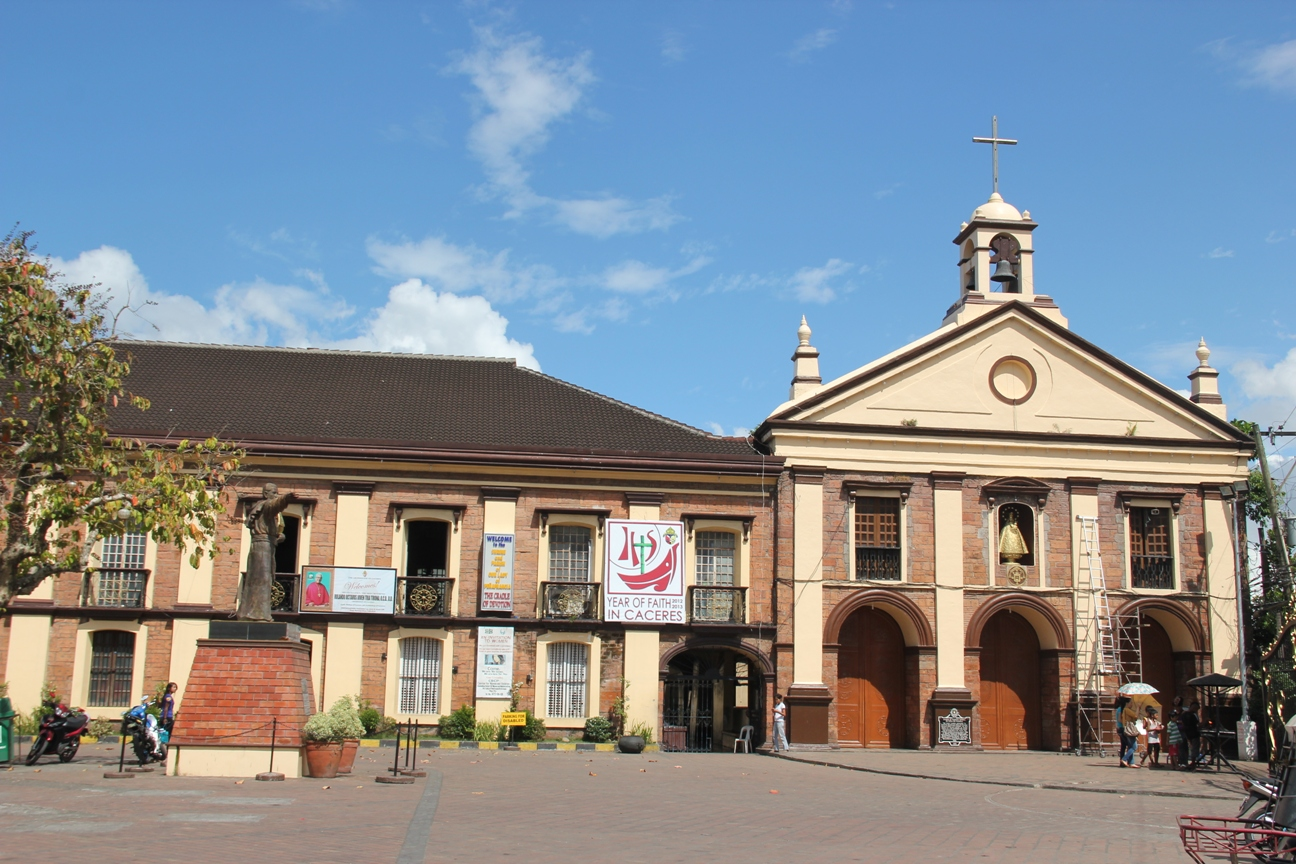
- Church facade in 2011

- Location in Luzon Location in the Philippines
- 13°38′04″N 123°11′44″E
- Location: Naga City
- Country: Philippines
- Denomination: Roman Catholic

History
- Status: Parish church
- Dedication: Our Lady of Penafrancia
- Consecrated: 1759

Architecture
- Functional status: Active
- Architectural type: Church building
- Style: Baroque
- Groundbreaking: 1742
- Completed: 1750

Administration
- Archdiocese: Càceres

Clergy
- Archbishop: Rex Andrew Alarcon
- Vicar: Carlo O. Villaluz
- Priest: Felipe B. Culvera III

The Our Lady of Peñafrancia Parish is a Roman Catholic church located in Naga City, Philippines. It is under the jurisdiction of the Archdiocese of Càceres.

== History ==
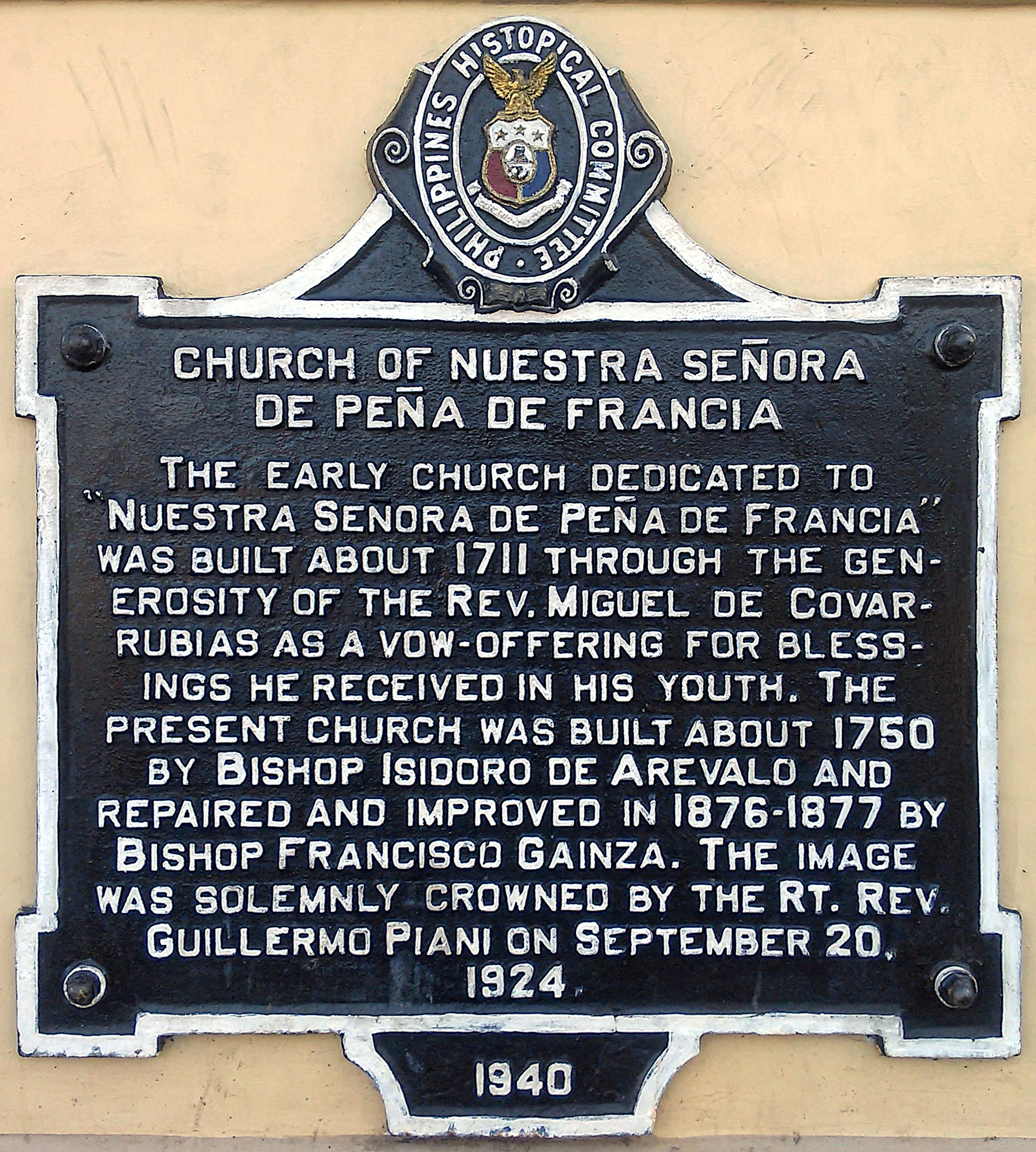
National historical marker installed in 1940

The image of Our Lady of Peñafrancia was initially kept in a chapel on the banks of the Bicol River. The present shrine was built in 1741 by Bishop Isidro Arevalo, and later renovated by Bishop Francisco Gainza. It was Gainza, who, on September 1, 1864, initiated the Traslación Procession on the Friday before the Feast of the Most Holy Name of Mary, where the image was brought from the Our Lady of Peñafrancia Shrine to the Naga Metropolitan Cathedral for a solemn novena.

The image of Our Lady of Peñafrancia was subsequently transferred to the new Peñafrancia Basilica. However, the parish church is also the location of the Plaza Miguel Robles de Covarrubias, where the Traslacion procession of Our Lady of Peñafrancia begins, opening the Peñafrancia Festival.

== Gallery ==
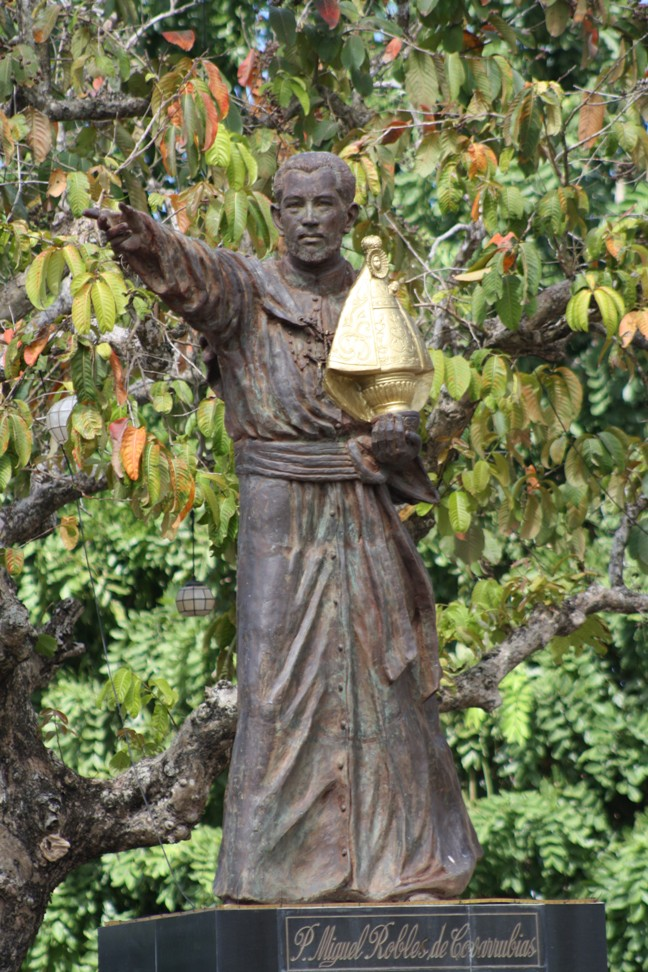
The Monument of Miguel Robles de Covarrubias

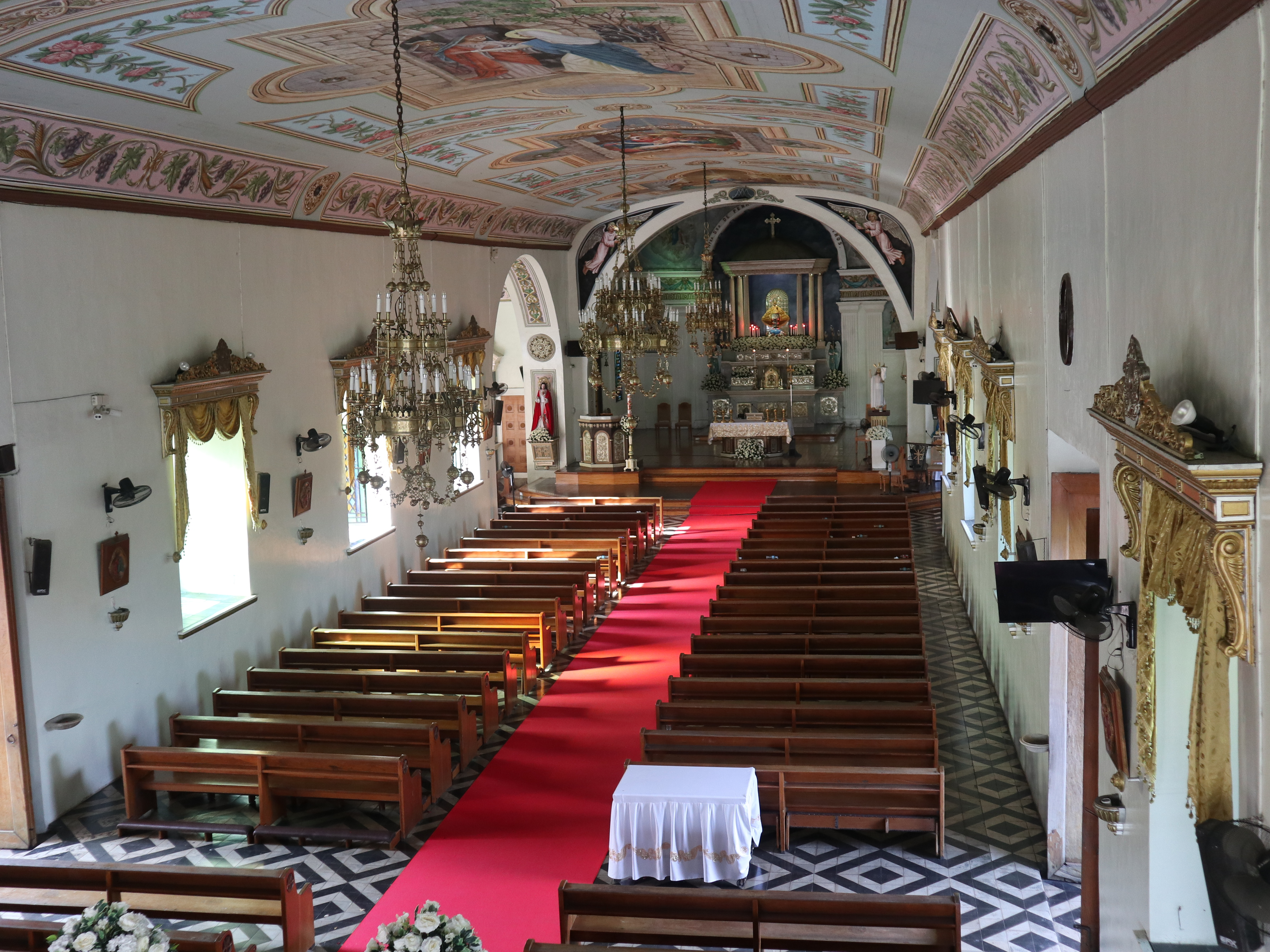
Church interior in 2023

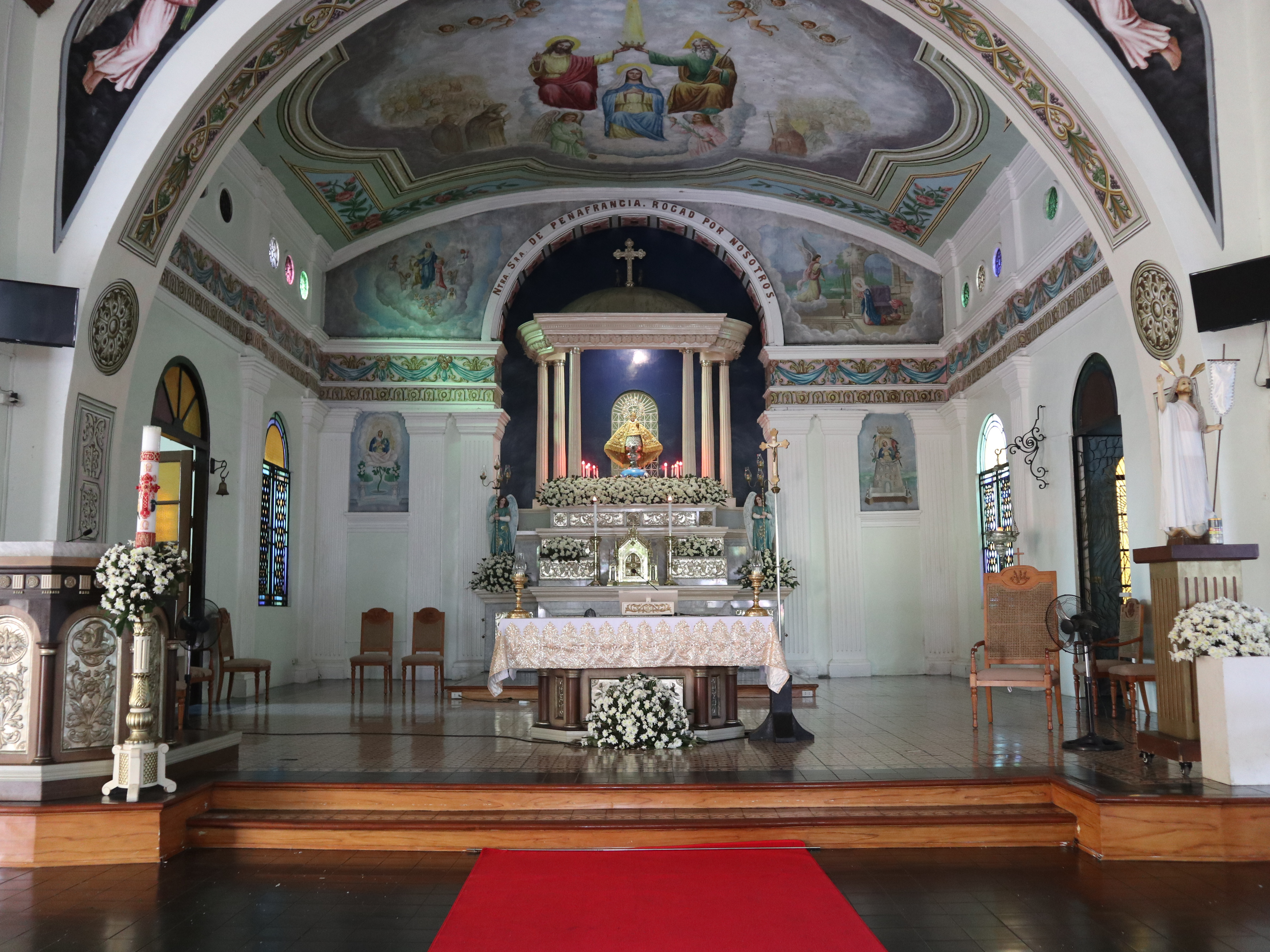
Church altar
