= Our Lady of Peñafrancia =

Philippine statue of the Virgin Mary

Our Lady of Peñafrancia Nuestra Señora de Peñafrancia
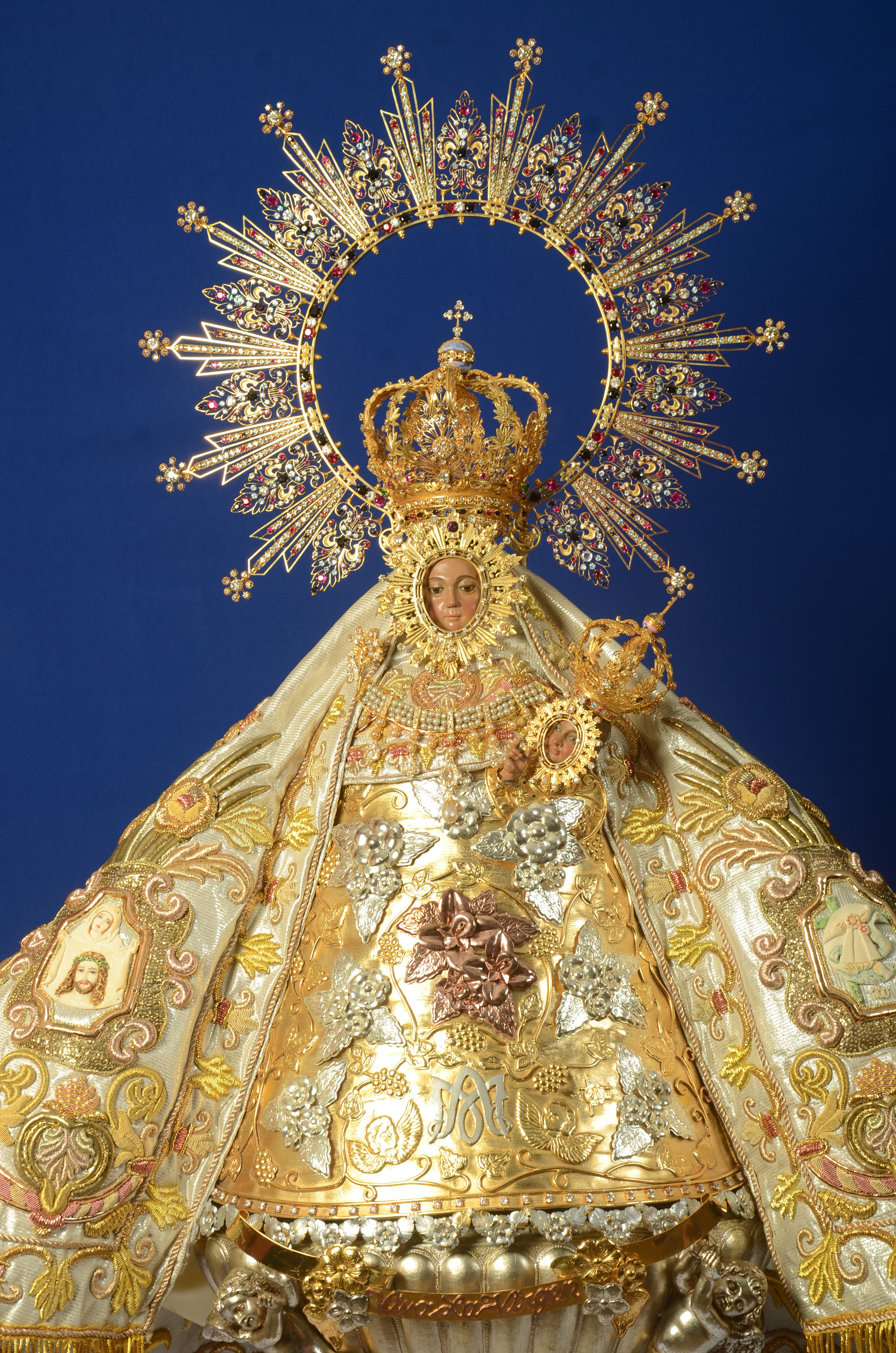
- Closeup of the image in Naga, 2013

Queen of Bicolandia Patroness of Bicol
- Venerated in: Catholic Church
- Major shrine: Minor Basilica and National Shrine of Our Lady of Peñafrancia; Metropolitan Cathedral and Parish of Saint John the Evangelist; Old Shrine and Parish of Peñafrancia
- Feast: Sunday after September 15 (Philippines); September 8 (Spain)
- Attributes: Dark skin; Aureole with twelve stars; Crown; Child Jesus; Mantum
- Patronage: Bicol region, Archdiocese of Caceres, Espírito Santo, clergy, the sick, the poor

Our Lady of Peñafrancia (Spanish: Nuestra Señora de Peñafrancia, Portuguese: Nossa Senhora da Penha de França) is a title of the Blessed Virgin Mary venerated in the Catholic Church. A miraculous copy is enshrined in the Minor Basilica of Our Lady of Peñafrancia (Basílica Menor de Nuestra Señora de Peñafrancia) in Naga, Camarines Sur, Philippines.

== Spain ==
The devotion to Our Lady of Peñafrancia originates from the province of Salamanca, Spain.

In the 1400s, Simón Vela, who came from a rich family, gave up his inheritance to become a laybrother of a Franciscan convent in Paris. He journeyed to the mountains of Peña de Francia ("Rock of France") in Salamanca, after hearing a voice instructing him to look for a sacred image of Mary; this is where the title "Peñafrancia" came from.

The statue had been hidden with other images and church bells to prevent them from falling into the hands of Moors and Saracens. In 1434, Vela rediscovered the statue buried under a rock on the mountain of Peña de Francia.

When reports of miraculous healings began circulating, Vela built a chapel for the image. Later, a larger church, the Santuario de Nuestra Señora de la Peña de Francia, was built on the plains at the top of Peña de Francia and entrusted to the Dominicans. In the fifteenth century, they built the church, the convent, and a hospice to accommodate pilgrims, with the tower built in 1767. The Spanish image was canonically crowned in 1952.

== The Philippines ==
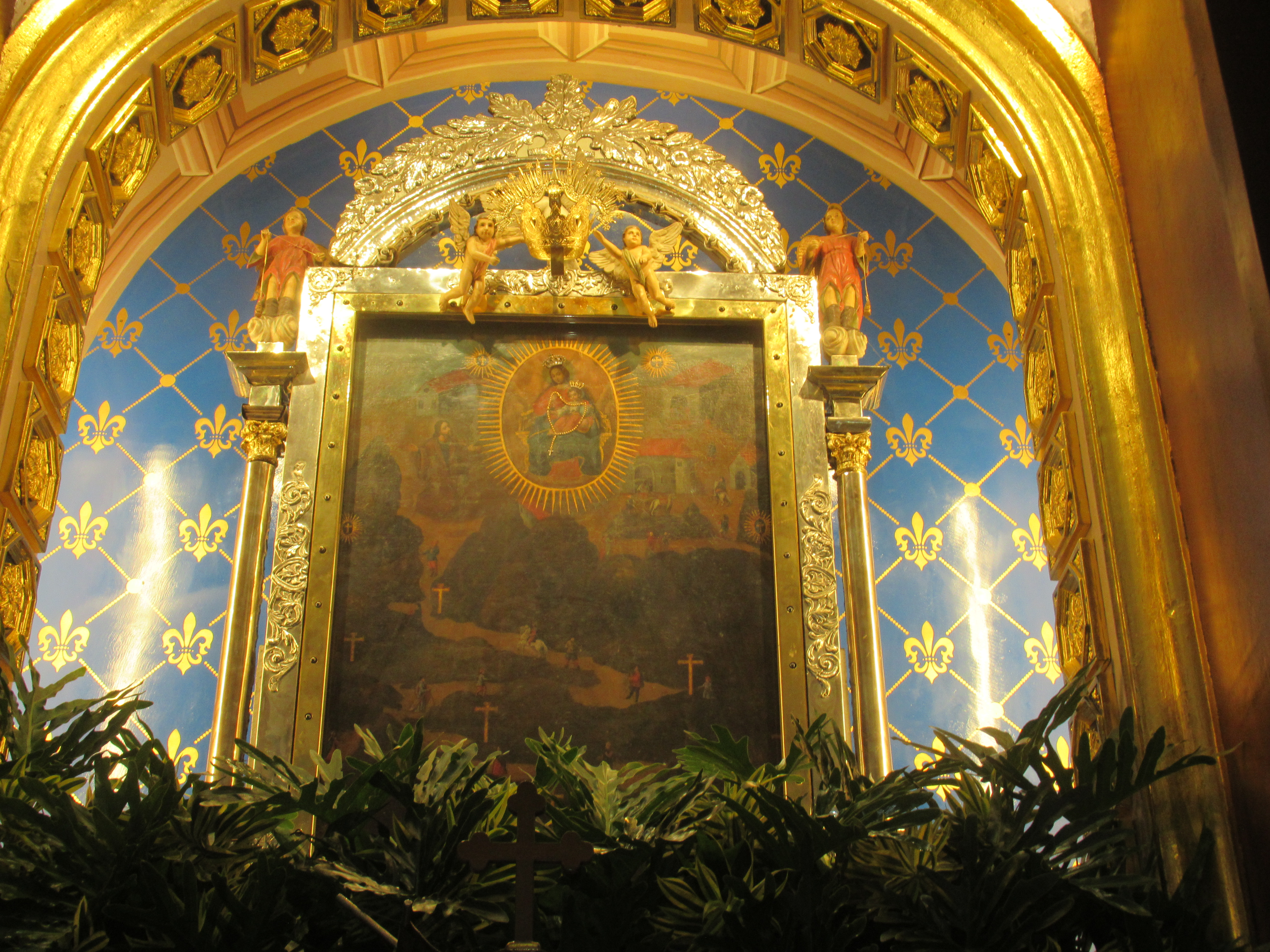
Our Lady of Peñafrancia de Manila

In 1712, Miguel Robles de Covarrubias, a seminarian at the Universidad de Santo Tomas in Manila and whose father was a Spanish official from Peña de Francia, fell seriously ill. He had a holy card of the image found by Simón Vela and placed it on the parts of his body which greatly pained him. This gave him relief from his suffering, and in gratitude he built a small church of nipa by a brook near the Pasig River, and housed a circa 1690 canvas copy of the Spanish image. The painting is now at the Archdiocesan Shrine of Nuestra Señora de Peñafrancia de Manila in Paco.

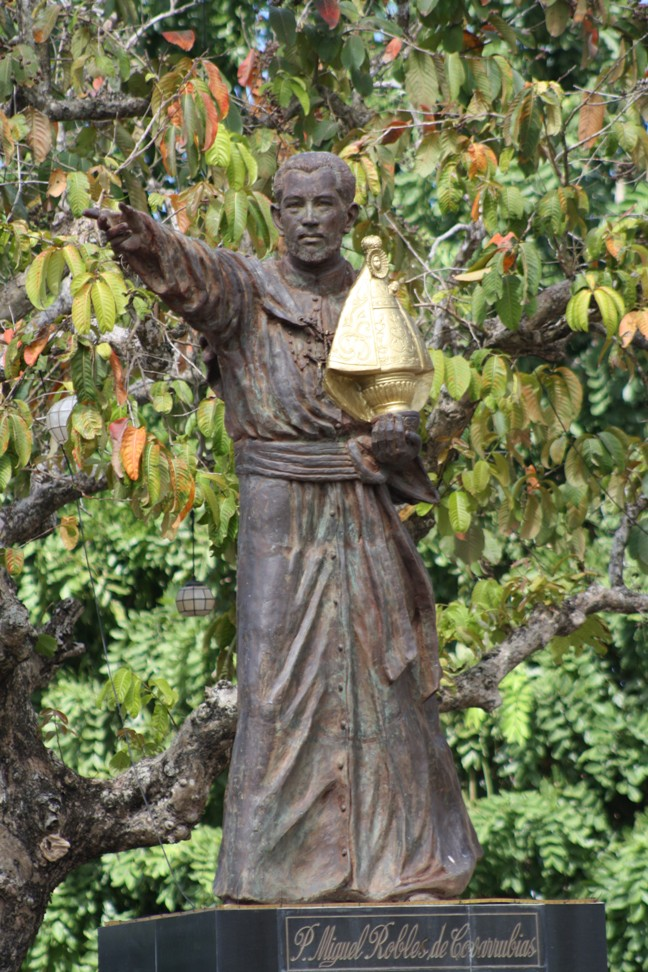
Statue of Fr. Miguel Robles de Covarrubias, Naga

Historical Marker at the Church of Nuestra Señora de Peña de Francia

Covarrubias was ordained to the priesthood in Ciudad de Nueva Cáceres (now Naga City), where he became parish priest of the cathedral. He had a local artisan carve a statue replicating the painting of the Virgin, and built a stone church for it. Many miracles were attributed to the intercession of Our Lady of Peñafrancia, which popularized the devotion among both natives and immigrant Chinese.

The devotion spread outside the Diocese of Nueva Cáceres, which then comprised the Bicolandia as well as Tayabas (now Quezon), Marinduque, Laguna, and up to Palanan, Isabela along the Cordillera Central range. It also reached many parts of Palawan and Mindanao, where Bicolano migrants settled and introduced the devotion.

When Francisco Gainza arrived in Naga in 1863 to take possession of the See of Nueva Cáceres, one of his priorities was spreading the devotion. On September 1, 1864, Gainza initiated the Traslación on the Friday before the Feast of the Most Holy Name of Mary, having the image was brought from Our Lady of Peñafrancia Shrine to the cathedral for a solemn novena, then on the afternoon of the ninth day, a Saturday, returned through the "Traslación por el río" (now called the Fluvial Procession), for her feast on Sunday.

=== Canonical coronation ===
On 20 September 1924, the image was canonically crowned by the Apostolic Delegate, Monsignor William Piani, at Naga Cathedral. As part of preparations for the coronation, there was a contest for Best Musical Composition. The winning piece, Himno a la Nuestra Señora de Peñafrancia, was composed by the Spanish priest Máximo Juguera, C.M., and became the anthem of the coronation and the feast itself.

In 2024, the Archdiocese of Cáceres celebrated the centennial of the image's canonical coronation. The theme of the celebration was ¡Se siempre la Reina! ("Be always the Queen!"), from the end of the chorus of Juguera's hymn.

=== Theft of the image ===
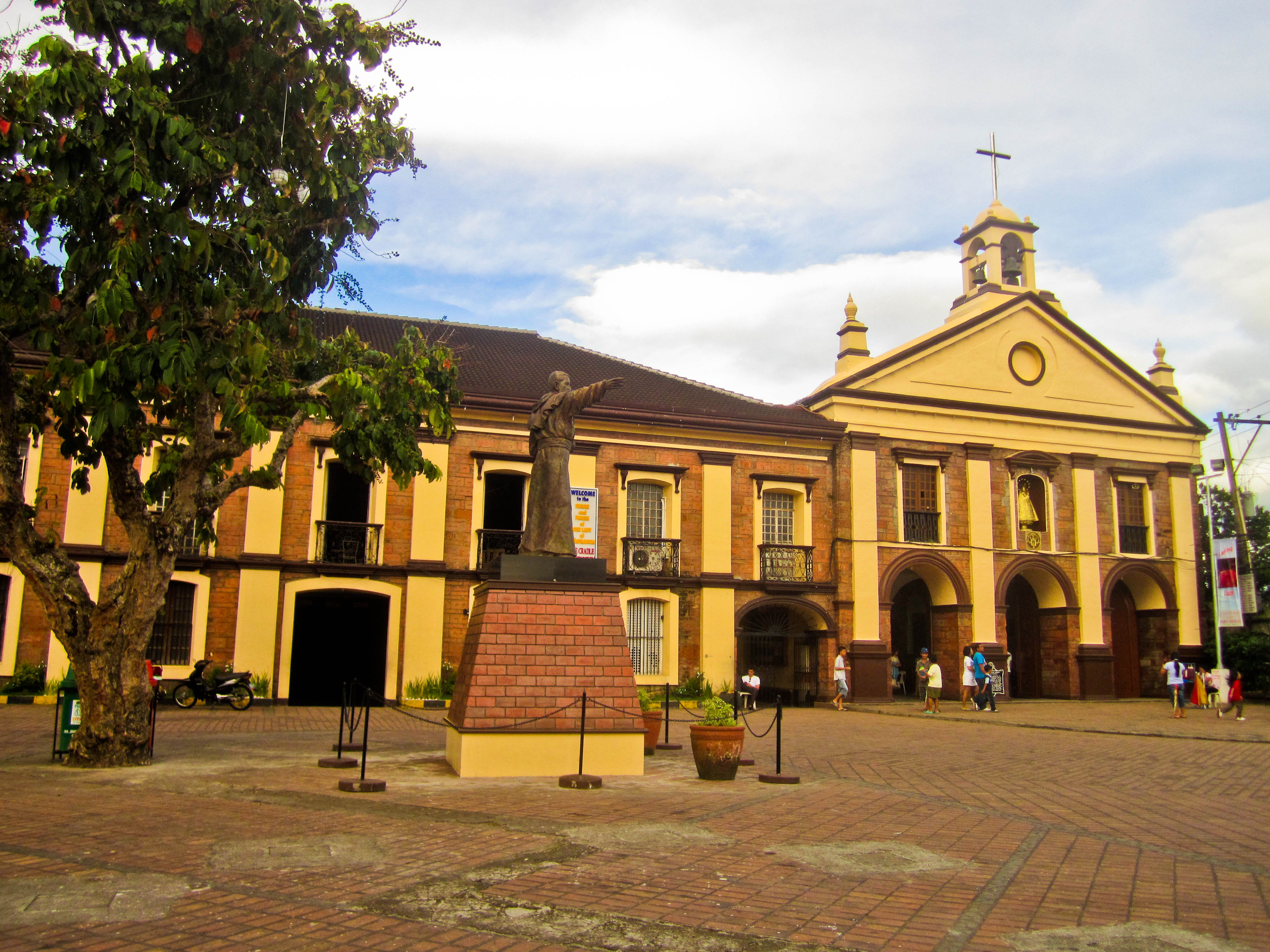
Our Lady of Peñafrancia Shrine, Naga City

On August 15, 1981, at around 4:30 in the morning, the caretaker of the Peñafrancia Shrine discovered the image of Our Lady of Peñafrancia had disappeared. The police reported the culprits had sawn the iron grilles behind the church and stole the image. The identity of the thieves remained a mystery, with the leading theory being they were selling it on a black market for valuable items. The manto and steel bar which held the image were found in the graveyard of Peñafrancia Shrine, without the image. In May 1982, an antiques dealer and devotee, Francisco Vecin, obtained information suggesting a man based along A. Mabini Street in Malate, Manila, was selling the image, which at the time was allegedly in the hands of a friend. He reported to Florencio Yllana that the missing image was located in Cebu. On September 3, 1982, the image was handed to Vecin in a sealed box, and returned to Naga on September 8, 1982 – the Feast of the Nativity of Mary. Following the theft, Church officials commissioned a replica for use in the 1981 celebrations. Today, the original image is enshrined in Peñafrancia Basilica along Balatas Street in Naga, which was built to accommodate the growing numbers of devotees starting in the late 1970s. The replica is instead used for all major processions.

=== Basilica ===
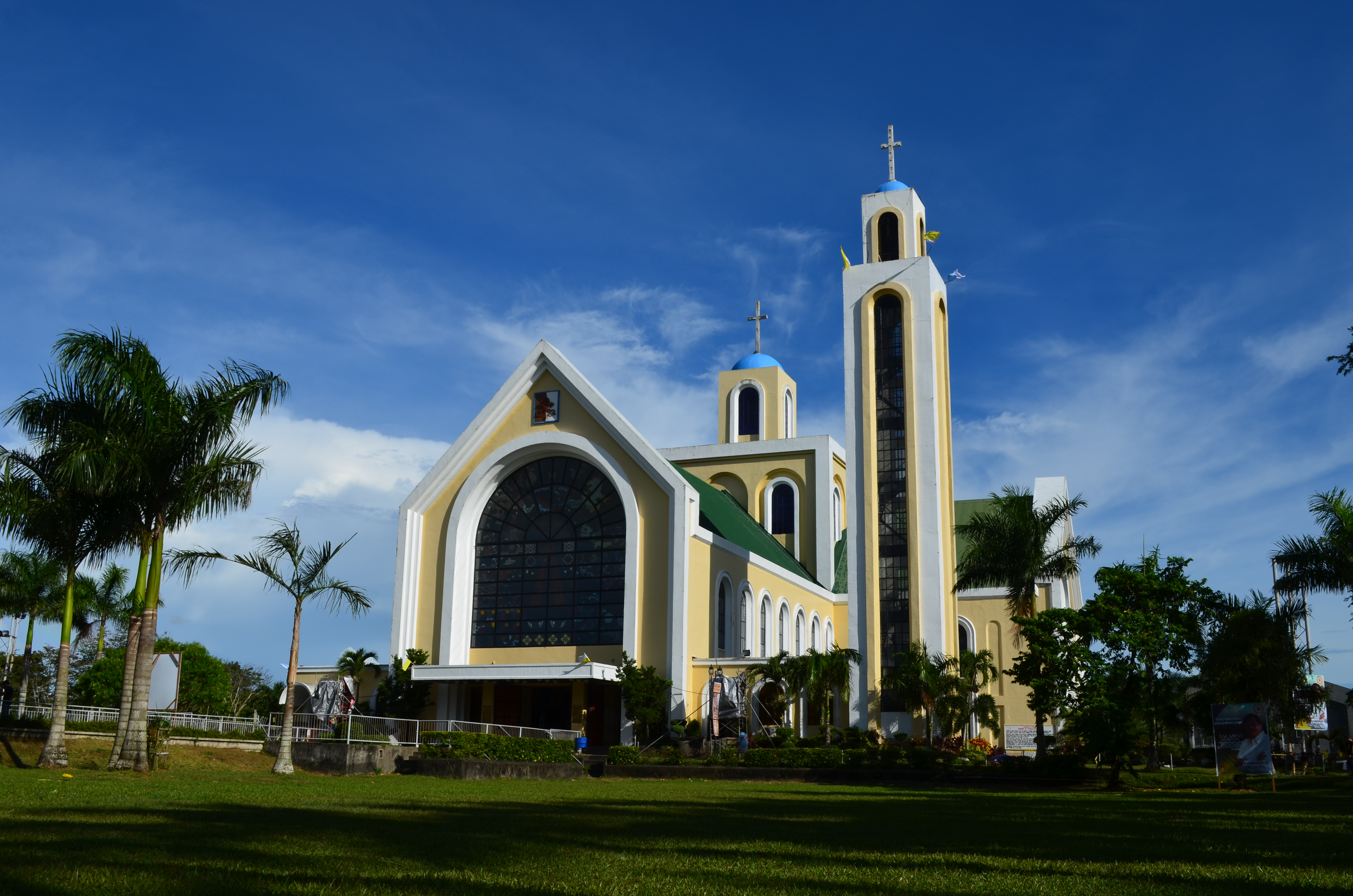
Minor Basilica of Our Lady of Peñafrancia, Naga City

In 1960, the first Archbishop of Cáceres, Pedro P. Santos, dreamt of building a new and bigger church to be a basilica and permanent shrine of the Lady of Peñafrancia in Bicol. The task was assumed by his successor, Teopisto V. Alberto.

On October 30, 1973, the shrine was made a parish with the Auxiliary Bishop of Cáceres, Concordio Sarte, as its first parish priest.

The new church was completed in 1981 and dedicated as the "Church of Nuestra Señora de Peñafrancia". The original statue commissioned by Covarrubias, recovered from theft in 1982, was moved to the new church, which in 1985 was elevated to the rank of minor basilica.

=== Tercentenary Celebration ===
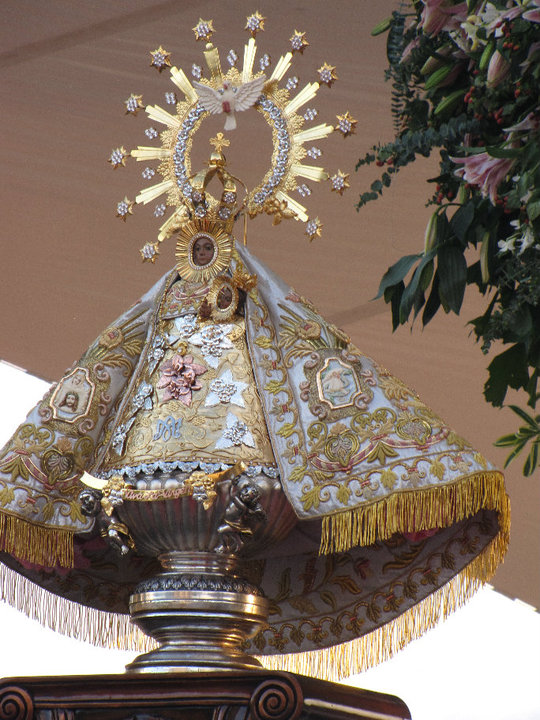
The image at the Quadricentennial Arch in Naga Metropolitan Cathedral, during the Tercentenary Celebration of the devotion.

In 2010, the devotion marked its 300th year. The Archdiocese of Caceres outlined a three-year preparation for the tercentenary, with each year focused on a particular theme and objective.

- Year 1 (September 2007 to September 2008 ) – the theme was "Remembering the Gift of the Devotion to Ina", dedicated to revisiting the history of the devotion in view of deeper understanding.
- Year 2 (September 2008 to September 2009) – the theme was "Renewing the Faith through Ina", dedicated to appreciating devotees' giftedness towards a more vibrant and relevant faith life.
- Year 3 (September 2009 to September 2010) – the theme was "Sharing the Future in Hope", dedicated to envisioning the future with the intent of sharing fruits of the devotion with subsequent generations.

In Year 4 (September 2010), the Church in Bicol celebrated the tercentenary itself with the theme, "A Gift Received, a Gift to Share" (Balaog inako, Balaog itao).

== Feast day ==
Picture of the Our Lady of Peñafrancia during the 316th Feast day at Naga Metropolitan Cathedral 2026

In Spain, the Feast of Nuestra Señora de la Peña de Francia is September 8.

In 1895, Pope Leo XIII, acting on the petition of the clergy and members of the Diocese of Nueva Cáceres, issued a rescript fixing the feast day of Our Lady of Peñafrancia on the first Sunday of July, and declaring her principal patroness of the city of Nueva Cáceres. Pope Pius X, through a rescript dated April 8, 1905, reassigned the Feast of Our Lady of Peñafrancia to the Sunday after the Octave of the Nativity of the Blessed Virgin Mary.

To determine the annual date of celebrations in Bicol, the main reference point is the Nativity of Mary (September 8), then its Octave day of (September 15), with the actual feast day on the Sunday immediately after. The Traslación which opens the novena is held in the afternoon of the Friday ten days before, and the Fluvial Procession is held on the Saturday or vigil of the feast day.

== The Peñafrancia Festival ==
Peñafrancia Festival
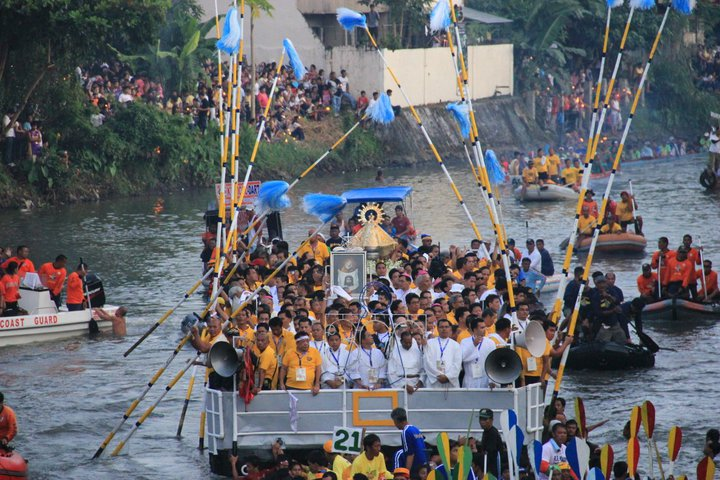
- The Fluvial Procession in 2010
- Observed by: Naga, Camarines Sur
- Liturgical color: Red
- Type: Religious / Cultural
- Date: Sunday after the Octave of the Nativity of the Blessed Virgin Mary (Sunday after September 15)
- 2025 date: September 21
- 2026 date: September 20
- 2027 date: September 19
- 2028 date: September 17
- Frequency: Annual
- Related to: Feast of the Black Nazarene

The Peñafrancia Festival, which has been described as one of the biggest Marian events in Asia, is a celebration of two feasts: that of the Divino Rostro (Holy Face of Jesus) on the second Friday of September; and that of Our Lady of Peñafrancia on the third weekend of September.

Considered one of the biggest and most popular religious events in the Philippines, the Peñafrancia festivities open the long celebrations of Christmas in the Philippines for Bicolanos. Tens of thousands of pilgrims and tourists visit Naga every September for the novena and subsequent events.

=== Feast day ===
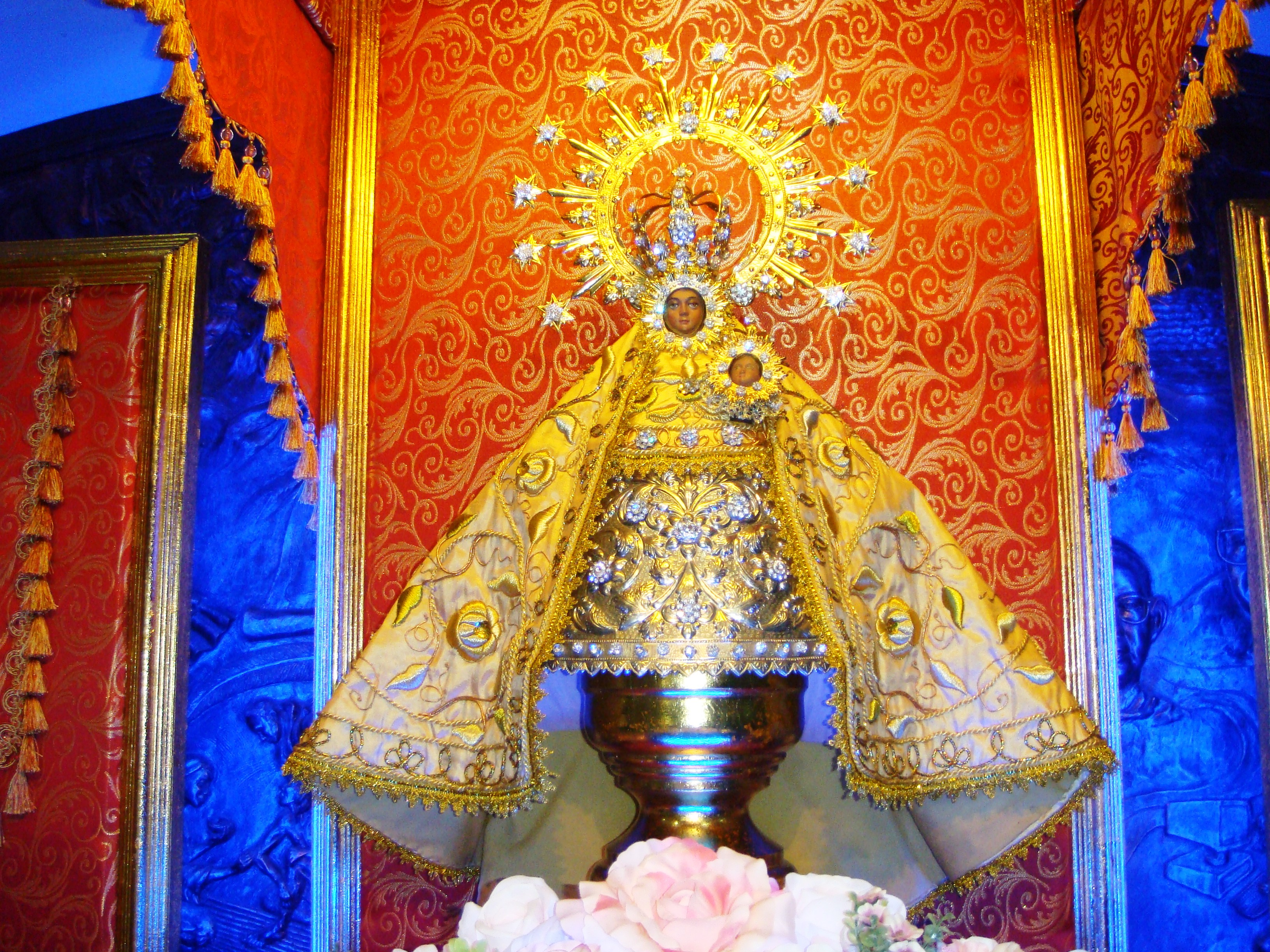
Our Lady of Peñafrancia replica at the Catholic Church-owned San Juan de Dios Hospital.

The feast day of Our Lady of Peñafrancia is on the third Sunday of September. Filipinos at home or abroad gather with relatives and friends to share food and drinks, and together give homage and thanksgiving to the Virgin.

The feast day is preceded by a novena to the Virgin. On the first day, the replica of the Virgin is brought to the Metropolitan Cathedral and Parish of Saint John the Evangelist, where the novena is held. On the last day, the image is returned to the shrine on a barge sailing the Naga River. The evening procession is lit with thousands of candles held by devotees in boats escorting the barge. When the image reaches its destination, devotees shout "¡Viva la Virgen!" ("Long live the Virgin!"), and the image is carried back to the cathedral in a land procession. Devotees with lit candles will often kneel on the ground and bow their heads in prayer as the fluvial procession carrying the Virgin travels on the Bicol River through the city centre.

A multicoloured barge carries both the Virgin of Peñafrancia and the Divino Rostro on the river from the Metropolitan Cathedral to the basilica. Upon arrival, the Virgin is received in formal rites by Catholic prelates of the Bicolandia, led by the Archbishop of Nueva Cáceres, the local ordinary.

=== Devotion to the Divino Rostro ===
The celebration begins with the Feast of the Nativity of Mary on September 8, which is marked by Masses in the image’s former shrine of the Metropolitan Cathedral.

The feast of the Divino Rostro (Holy Face), kept locally on the second Friday of September, is the first highlight of the celebrations. The festival begins with a novena to the Divino Rostro, first venerated in Naga in 1882 after a cholera outbreak. According to legend, the epidemic subsided after the Divino Rostro – a painting of Saint Veronica holding her veil with an imprint of Jesus’ Face – was placed on the cathedral altar.

The Divino Rostro icon is brought in procession from the Peñafrancia Basilica to the old Peñafrancia Shrine, where it stays for the novena with the usual focus on the sick. Generally, the first devotees begin celebrations, singing the "Hymn to the Divino Rostro" at the end of services.

=== Traslación ===
The second Friday of September marks the feast day of the Divino Rostro, following the novena at the shrine. During the Traslación, the images of Our Lady of Peñafrancia and the Divino Rostro are brought by barefooted male voyadores from the basilica through the main streets of the city to the cathedral. This procession, which usually lasts four hours, sees thousands of devotees from all over Bicol and other parts of the country.

The image of the Our Lady of Peñafrancia is processed at dawn from Peñafrancia Basilica to her old home for the Traslación in the afternoon. After the procession is a pontifical Mass concelebrated by the Archbishop of Cáceres, bishops, and clergy from dioceses nationwide.

The Traslación begins after the noon Mass with the procession of students, delegates from other regions, teachers, government officials, and other professionals while the images are being prepared. At around three o'clock in the afternoon, the Divino Rostro icon leaves the shrine for Naga Cathedral. Following the recitation of the Rosary, the image of Our Lady of Peñafrancia follows, more slowly than the Divino Rostro. After two or three hours, the Divino Rostro icon arrives at the cathedral, and after an hour, the image of Our Lady enters via the Porta Mariae (Gate of Mary). A Solemn Pontifical Mass on the first day of the novena is celebrated after the procession at the Quadricentennial Arch at the cathedral grounds, in the conclusion of the Mass, the two images are brought onto the cathedral to begin the novena to Our Lady of Peñafrancia as the people sing the hymn, Resuene Vibrante.

=== Novena to the Our Lady of Peñafrancia ===
At the start of the Traslación, the novena to Our Lady begins at the cathedral, the ritual reportedly enabling cures among attendants. The novena centers around Mary's intercession to Jesus and has a designated theme each year. On some of the days of the novena, dawn and evening processions are held within Naga wherein the images of both Our Lady and the Divino Rostro are brought out to the streets. Believers vie for the honor of sponsoring novena masses and prayers at the cathedral during the nine days.

=== Parades and celebrations ===
Different parades are held during the novena to the Our Lady. These events are open to the public, with coverage on radio and television as well as on online streaming. The Saturday following the Translación, the citywide Marian Youth Congress is held, gathering young people from the city and region to share and strengthen their faith.

During the Sunday after the Traslación, the majorettes, CAT, and Drum and Lyre Corps, plus marching bands, exhibit their dancing, music playing, and silent drill either at Plaza Quezon or the Robredo Coliseum, with the best in each category being announced at the end of the day's events. On the Tuesday before the Fluvial Procession, the Regional Cheerdance Competition is held at the Robredo Coliseum, with almost all of the schools and universities in Bicol participating in the event, followed by a gymnastics and field exhibition competition at Plaza Quezon.

On Wednesday, school contingents of the Boy Scouts of the Philippines and Girl Scouts of the Philippines from all over the Bicol Region together with their school drum and lyre corps, drum majors and majorettes parade in the daylong, Regional BSP/GSP and Drum and Lyre Corps Parade and competition at the Plaza Quezon. Awards are given to the best contingents and DLCs which have distinguished themselves.

On Thursday, the Civic Parade of the Government workers, and different associations and organizations in Bicol, along with the Float Parade that is joined by hundreds of floats honoring the Virgin, is held in the morning. In recent years, this has been followed in the afternoon by a street dance competition between schools in the city and the region at Plaza Quezon. The best float of the morning and the champion of the afternoon ritual dance showdown are awarded after the events.

On Friday, the popular and century-old military parade, performed by all high schools, senior high schools, colleges and universities in the Bicol Region, as well as service personnel of the Philippine National Police, the Armed Forces of the Philippines, the Philippine Coast Guard and the Bureau of Fire Protection, parade in the major streets of Naga. It is considered to be the longest military parade outside Manila due to its daylong, sometimes going past sundown, parade, and is one of the largest to be held in Southeast Asia, with an estimated 70,000 marchers, mostly youth and university cadets and students together with athletes. The parade is also a symbolic anniversary of the 1898 Liberation of Naga during the Philippine Revolution. Dubbed the Bicol Region Military Parade, it is considered one of the highlights of the celebrations, with the Mayor of Naga as reviewing officer. Awards and decorations are handed out to the best contingents and bands at the end of the long parade. In 2023, the parade was finally split into two parts, the first held on Saturday, and the second on the usual Friday.

=== Fluvial Procession ===
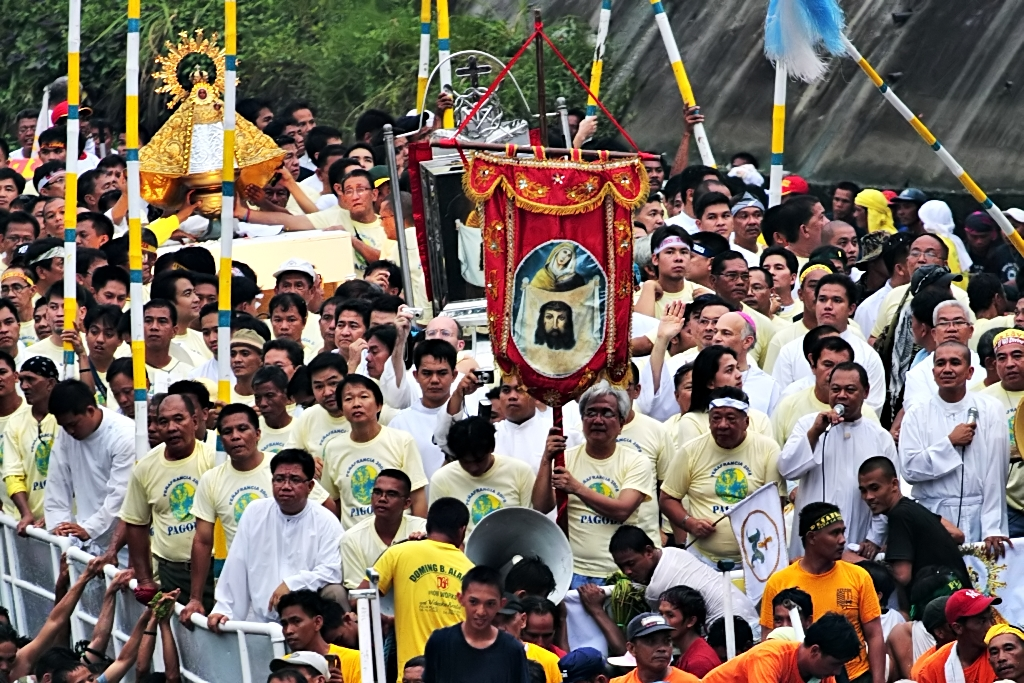
Fluvial Procession during Peñafrancia Festival on the eve of the image’s feast day.

A fluvial procession at the end of the novena concludes the feast. Following a farewell Mass at the Metropolitan Cathedral, the images are both carried through the streets and then in a pagoda (the Filipino term for a decorated shrine-barge for fluvial processions, usually with more than one tier) for its return to the minor basilica, where a Pontifical Mass is held. Along the route, people shout "¡Viva La Virgen!" while waving handkerchiefs and towels.

The images of the Virgin and the Divino Rostro are escorted by a large group of devotees, many of whom ride colorful paddle boats with the pagoda. Privileged individuals join Church and civic officials often ride the pagoda with the icons; female devotees are traditionally not allowed on the pagoda as the Virgin must be the only woman onboard, and doing so will bring misfortune.

=== Festival Sunday ===
Festival Masses held on the Sunday after the Octave of the Nativity of Mary at the Peñafrancia Minor Basilica mark the official termination of the festivities. Masses are held all day long in all the Catholic parishes and diocese cathedrals of the Bicol Region. In addition, masses are held in many parts of the country in her honor, organized by local devotees' associations.

On the Monday following the solemnity the schools that have won the championship as best contingents or bands in the Friday parade hold one final parade - a sort of victory parade - in their communities.

=== Changes in the Peñafrancia Fiesta celebration due to the COVID-19 pandemic ===
With the ongoing threat of the COVID-19 pandemic in the Philippines, the Archdiocese of Cáceres and the Naga City Government reduced the 2020 festivities to comply with minimum health standards enforced nationwide.

As such, the following changes were made:

- Instead of holding public novena prayers to the Divino Rostro from September 2 to 10 and the novena to Our Lady of Peñafrancia from September 11 to 19, at the Peñafrancia Shrine, Metropolitan Naga Cathedral, and the Minor Basilica, the Novena was instead prayed in the homes of the faithful.
- The annual Traslación and Fluvial Procession were cancelled.
- The feast day Mass on 20 September 2020 was streamed live from the Peñafrancia Basilica.
- Other dioceses in Bicol were asked to hold Masses locally on the same date, to avoid pilgrims entering the city.
- All civic and commercial activities connected to the feast, such as the Voyadores Festival, civic and military parades, trade fairs, exhibits, and concerts, were cancelled.

The same changes were adopted for the 2021 Peñafrancia Festivities from 01 to 19 September 2021. Traditional celebrations resumed in 2022, with precautions against COVID infections.

== Patronage ==
In Spain, Our Lady of Peñafrancia is the patroness of Ciudad Rodrigo. In Fuerteventura a festival is held on the third Saturday of September.

Our Lady of Peñafrancia is the patroness of the Bicol Region of the Philippines. She is also the patroness of the city of Naga, the province of Camarines Sur, and the Diocese of Caceres. She is also considered the patroness of seafarers, farmers, and fishermen.

== Elsewhere ==
The Church of Our Lady of Penha de Franca, in Goa, India, was founded by Franciscans in 1626, and the local feast day is on 27 December.

In the United States, the Feast of Our Lady of Peñafrancia is one of the oldest and largest Filipino Marian celebrations in San Diego, California, with a history of over 50 years.

== Hymn ==
The Himno a la Nuestra Señora de Peñafrancia, commonly known to devotees by its incipit "Resuene Vibrante", is the official hymn of the image and its devotion. Composed by the priest Máximo Juguera, C.M., it won first prize in the hymn-writing competition for the image's canonical coronation in 1924. The hymn was translated to Central Bikol by Jesús Esplana and Sohl Sáez, but the original Spanish lyrics were made the sole official text at the image's tercentenary in 2010.

In 2023, a bilingual version with the Spanish chorus and Bikol verses was released.

=== Spanish text ===
Coro:

Resuene vibrante el himno de amor
Que entona tu pueblo con grata y emoción
Resuene vibrante el himno de amor
Que entona tu pueblo con grata emoción
Patrona del Bícol, Gran Madre de Dios
Sé siempre la Reina de Nuestra Región
Patrona del Bícol, Gran Madre de Dios
Sé siempre la Reina de Nuestra Región.

Estrofa I:

Los ríos murmuran tu nombre al correr;
Los montes proclaman tu gloria y poder.
El pueblo creyente con gozo te ve
Te canta amoroso y besa tu pie.
El pueblo creyente con gozo te ve
Te canta amoroso y besa tu pie.

(Coro)

Estrofa II:

Patrona del Bícol, altar del amor,
Reliquia bendita que el cielo nos dio
Escucha benigna del pueblo el clamor
Que acude a tu Templo con fé y devoción
Patrona del Bícol, altar del amor,
Reliquia bendita que el cielo nos dio
Escucha benigna del pueblo el clamor
Que acude a tu Templo con fé y devoción.

(Coro)

Estrofa III:

Los pobres y tristes te buscan con fé
Te miran llorando les miras también
Al punto sus lágrimas se truecan en bien
Y a casa gozosos les vemos volver.
Los pobres y tristes te buscan con fé
Te miran llorando les miras también
Al punto sus lágrimas se truecan en bien
Y a casa gozosos les vemos volver.

(Coro)

=== Central Bikol version ===
I
Maski an kasalogan, Sambit an si'mong ngaran
Maski an kabukiran, Ika an rokyaw.
Kami si'mong aki, Pano' nin kaogmahan
Si'mong nangangako, Ika kamo'tan.
Kami si'mong aki, Pano' nin kaogmahan
Si'mong nangangako, Ika kamo'tan.

Chorus:
Awiton an awit nin pagkamoot
Sa saimo samuyang idinodolot
Awiton an awit nin pagkamoot
Sa saimo samuyang idonodolot.
Patrona nin Bikol, Ina ka nin Dios
Magdanay na Reina nin samuyang rehiyon,
Patrona nin Bikol, Ina ka nin Dios
Magdanay na Reina nin samuyang rehiyon.

== See also ==
- Penha de França
- Penha de França, Goa

== Sources ==
- Rubio, T. N., Zantua, B., & Real, M. (2010, September/October). The Blue and Gold Special Commemorative Issue: 300 YEARS OF DEVOTION TO THE VIRGIN OF PEÑAFRANCIA (PDF). Ateneo De Naga Junior High School. Retrieved from:
