= Peñafrancia Basilica =

Roman Catholic basilica in Naga City, Philippines

- Minor Basilica and National Shrine of Our Lady of Peñafrancia
- Basilika Menor at Pambansang Dambana ng Mahal na Birhen ng Peñafrancia (Filipino); Basílica Menor y Santuario Nacional de Nuestra Señora de Peñafrancia (Spanish)
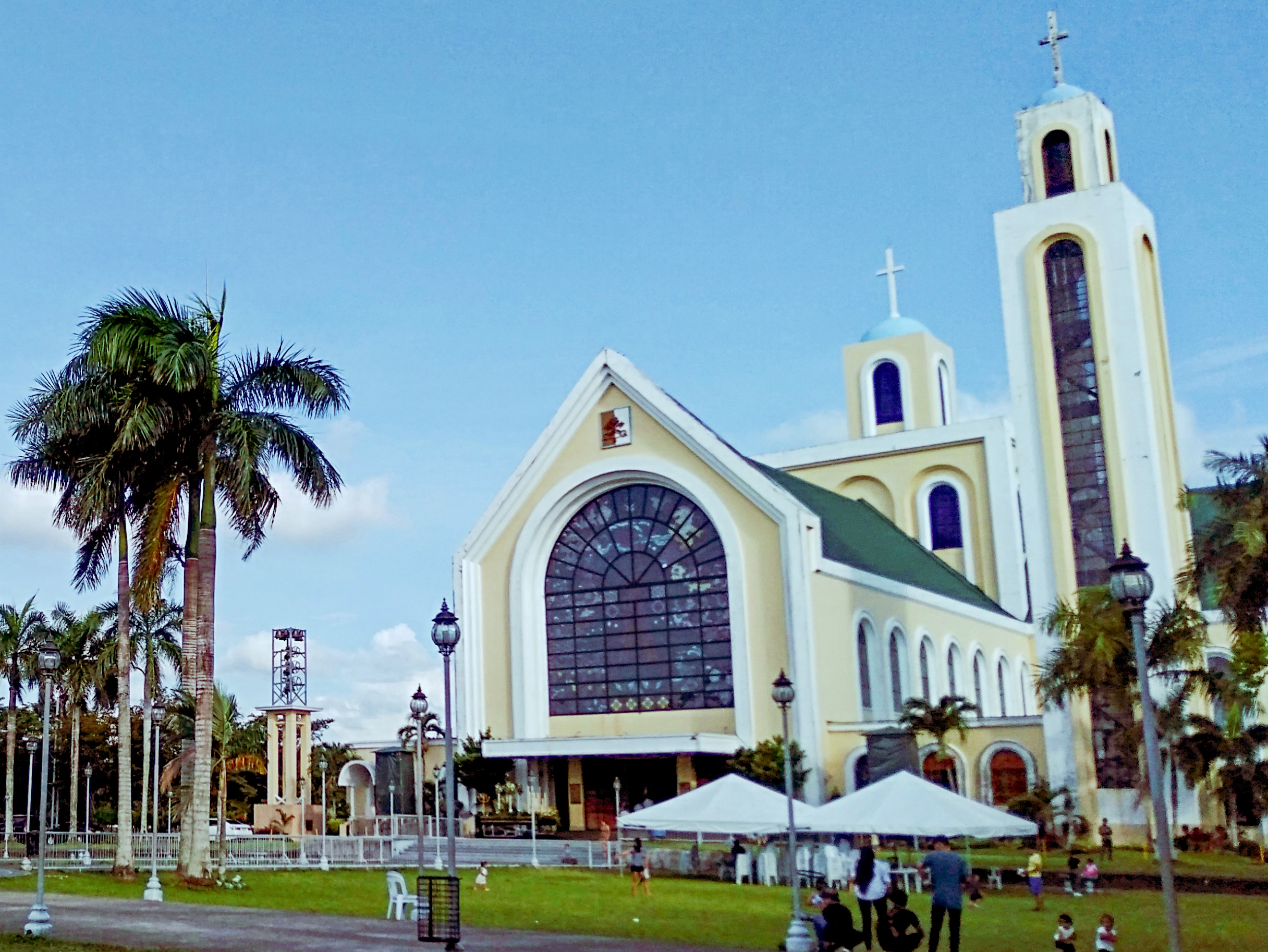
- The basilica in 2019

- Location in Luzon Location in the Philippines
- 13°37′55″N 123°12′00″E
- Location: Naga, Camarines Sur
- Country: Philippines
- Denomination: Roman Catholic

History
- Status: Minor Basilica, National Shrine
- Founder(s): Teopisto V. Alberto, then-Archbishop of Cáceres
- Dedication: Our Lady of Peñafrancia
- Consecrated: May 22, 1982; 44 years ago

Architecture
- Functional status: Active
- Architectural type: Church building
- Style: Modern
- Groundbreaking: April 18, 1976; 50 years ago
- Completed: September 1981; 44 years ago

Specifications
- Capacity: 1,500 sitting, 2,700 standing

Administration
- Archdiocese: Cáceres
- Parish: Our Lady of Peñafrancia

Clergy
- Archbishop: Rex Andrew Alarcon
- Rector: Rev. Fr. Eugene Lubigan

The Minor Basilica and National Shrine of Our Lady of Peñafrancia, commonly known as the Peñafrancia Basilica, is a Roman Catholic minor basilica located on the outskirts of Naga City—also known as the Pilgrim City and Queen City of Bicol—in the Bicol Region of the Philippines.

It is one of the largest Marian pilgrimage sites in Asia. The icon of Our Lady of Peñafrancia is enshrined in this sanctuary. Rev. Fr. Eugene Lubigan is the present rector of the basilica, having been appointed in 2024. It is the only basilica in the Bicol Region and the Roman Catholic Archdiocese of Caceres.

== History ==
The concept for the building came from the late Archbishop Pedro Paulo Santos y Songco in 1960. Construction began on April 18, 1976, but was delayed for a number of years due to financing problems and was not completed until September 1981.

On May 22, 1982, it was initially dedicated as the Church of Nuestra Señora de Peña de Francia. Exactly three years later, the church was given the title of "Basilica Minore" by the Holy See after a request from the third Archbishop of Cáceres, Leonardo Z. Legaspi, O.P., D.D.

The Peñafrancia Basilica enshrines an image of the Virgin Mary that was sculpted in 1710. It was commissioned by Miguel de Cobarrubias, who moved to the Philippines from Spain with his family and believed that the Virgin Mary had helped him numerous times in his life. The image was housed in a small chapel until the basilica was built.

Archbishop Pedro P. Santos noted that the devotees and pilgrims kept increasing through the years. In 1960, he dreamt of building a basilica to honor the Virgin. Shortly after, through the meditation of the Archbishop Emeritus Teopisto V. Alberto, D.D. and the Association of Our Lady of Peñafrancia, Mr and Mrs Macario Mariano donated a three-hectare lot in Barrio Balatas. Bishop Concordio Sarte initiated the groundwork for the construction, with the blessing rite and laying of the cornerstone held on Easter Sunday, April 18, 1976. Dignitaries included those of the Philippine Catholic Church led by Cardinal Jaime Sin, the Archbishop of Manila, as well as prominent Bicolano sponsors.

== Recognition as a minor basilica ==
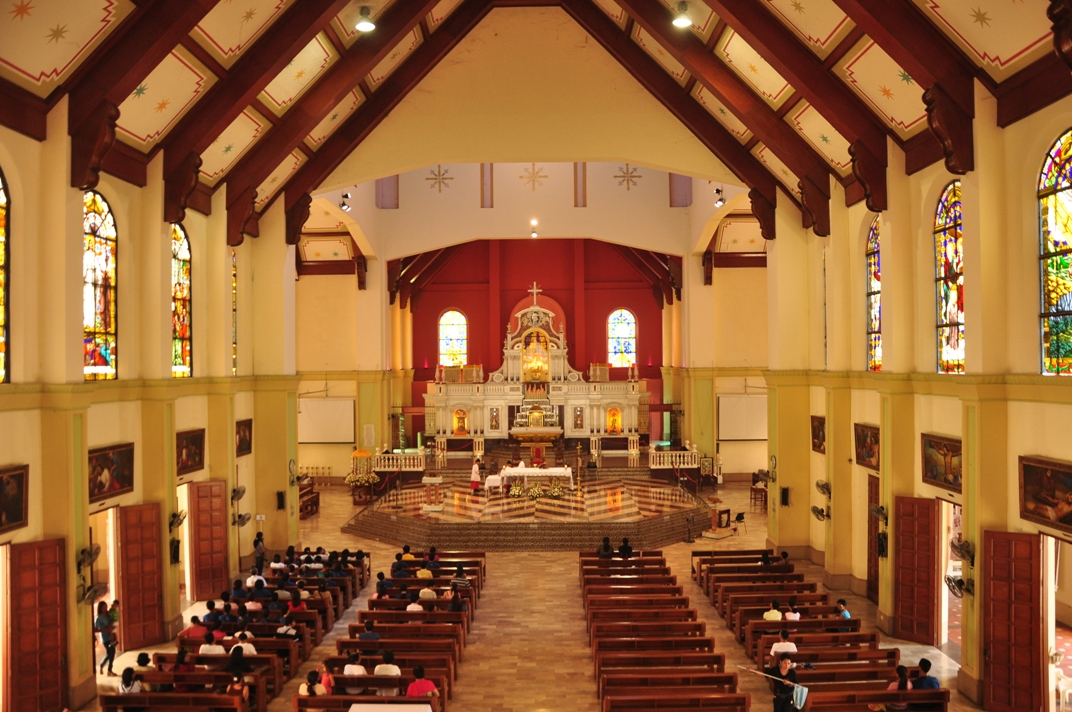
Basilica interior in 2012

Immediately thereafter, there was a pause in construction. The association nonetheless continued soliciting contributions and donations. Bishop Sarte was transferred to Sorsogon and Fr. Sofio Balce (later appointed Auxiliary Bishop of Cáceres) took over as parish priest and rector of Our Lady of Peñafrancia Parish and Shrine. He reorganized the different committees and launched “Operation Peñafrancia Basilica”. From then on, construction continued on at an almost fevered pitch until it was finally completed in September 1981. On May 22, 1982, Cardinal Sin officiated the solemn inauguration and dedication of the shrine, with Cardinal Julio Rosales in attendance.

On January 18, 1984, Leonardo Z. Legaspi was installed as the third Archbishop of Cáceres. He sent a petition to the Holy See to the effect that the title of Basilica be granted to the new church. On May 22, 1985, he received the decree from the Sacred Congregation for Divine Worship bestowing the title and dignity of “Basilica Minore” to the “Church of Nuestra Señora de Peñafrancia”. This meant that the shrine enabled the granting of plenary indulgences under the usual conditions.

Barely 10 years after its completion, the physical structure of the basilica had deteriorated earlier than expected due to construction defects and exposure to the elements.

In 1991, the basilica rector, Msgr. Manolo de los Santos, began repairs on the basilica. The doors were reinforced and strengthened, stained glass windows and oil paintings of the Stations of the Cross were installed, while concrete pathways and drainage systems were constructed around the shrine complex. His efforts, however, were cut short in late June 1993 due to his transfer to Iriga City as its new parish priest.

In July 1993, the new rector, Msgr. Alberto Nero, resumed major repairs and repainting of the structure. The first move was to treat the entire church and shrine complex with anti-termite chemicals to control and exterminate the pests, which have already damaged portions of the building.

By September 1994, the leaking roofs of the basilica were fully repaired and repainted, with the damaged ceiling rehabilitated and repainted together with the interior walls. The electrical wirings and installations were also retrofitted, while the giant chandeliers were replaced with the more luminous and economical Highbay luminaire lamps. The cross topping the dome was fitted with neon light tubes to distinguish the basilica at night from afar, and a 20 KVA standby power generator was installed to supply the emergency light system during outages.

On November 3, 1994, the repair works and repainting of the exterior walls were resumed. The broken window panes, and partly corroded steel window frames were replaced and strengthened. The towering belfry, however, remained untouched.

The complete repairs and commissioning of the belfry seemed to be impossible during much of the mid-90s. Most of its windows were already broken and the steel frames were no longer safe. The long and winding steel staircase towards the top of the belfry had already been declared structurally unsound by engineers, and to replace it with a concrete staircase would take a year. Only after this can it receive a suitable bell system or an electronic carillon. Above all, the shrine had to be provided with a Perpetual Adoration Chapel for the Blessed Sacrament which should be accessible to the public at any time of the day. The left wing of the basilica is deemed suitable for this.

The basement has yet to be converted and developed into an Audio-Visual Room and furnished with the necessary equipment for briefing and orientating the thousands of pilgrims who visit the shrine.

The minor basilica was were the funeral mass for the late Secretary of the Interior Jesse Robredo was held in August 2012 - as then Mayor of Naga, he was one of the patrons of the devotion and one of the financial backers of the minor basilica.

== Gallery ==
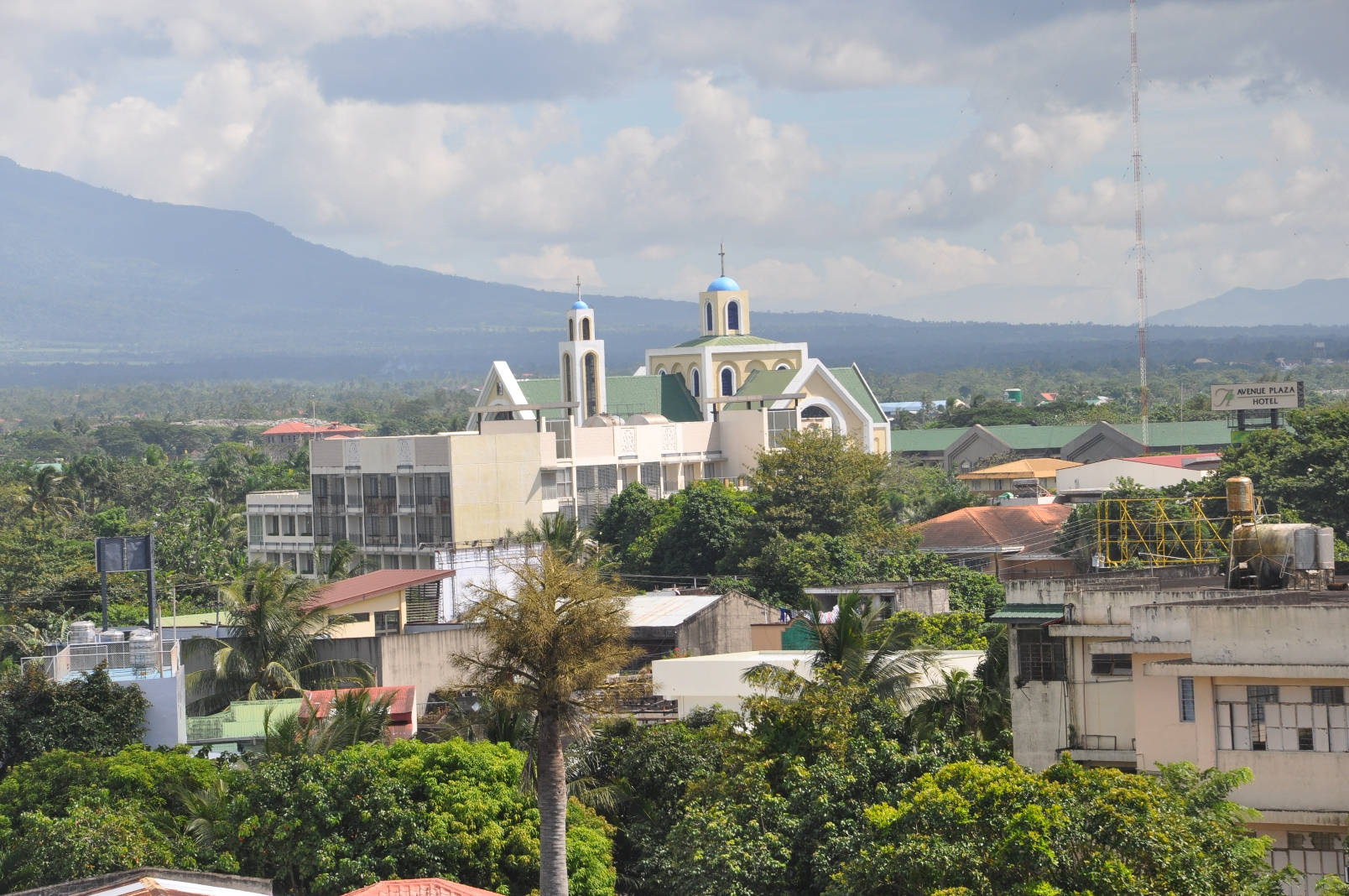
Church exterior view

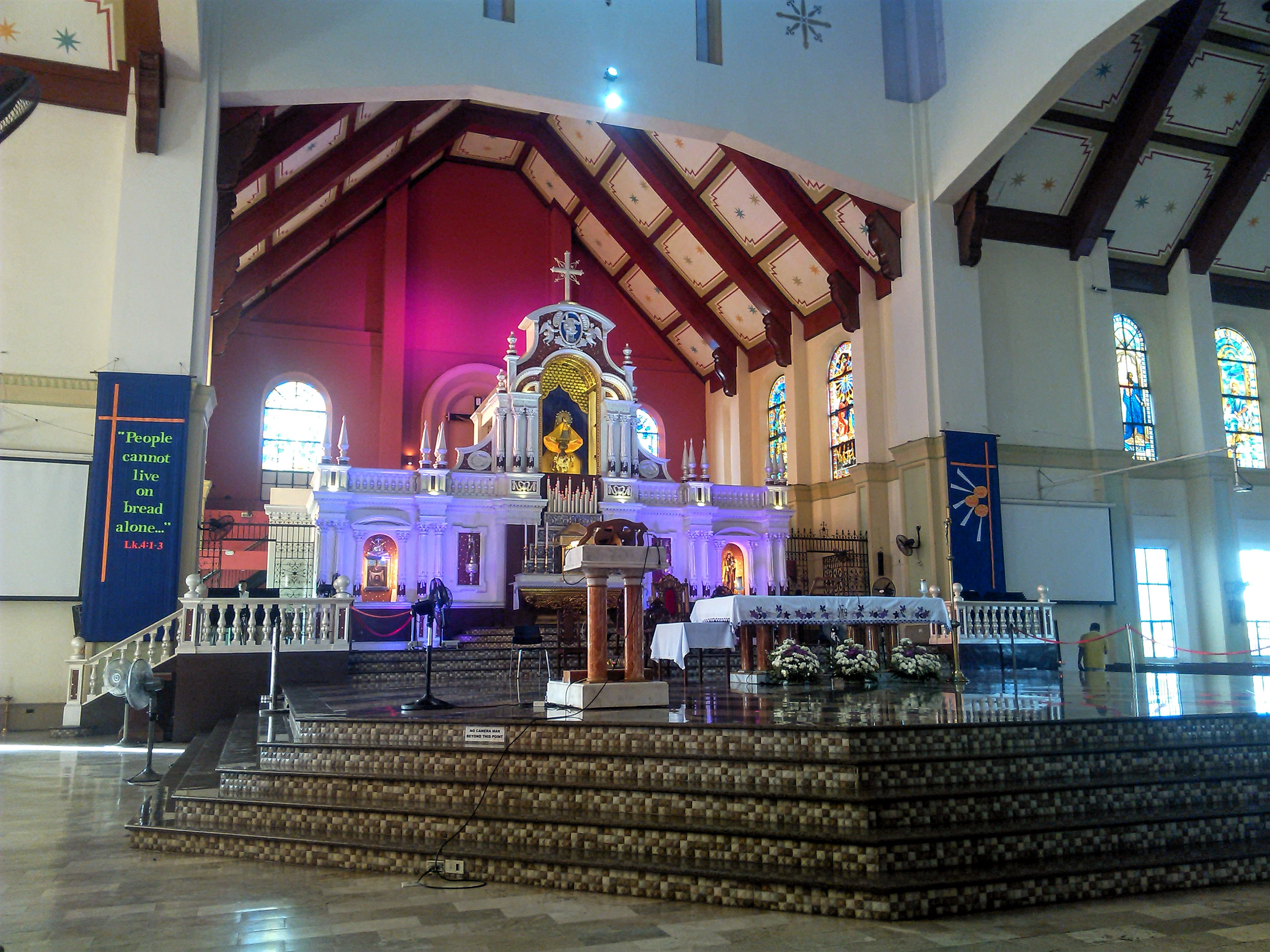
Church altar in 2016

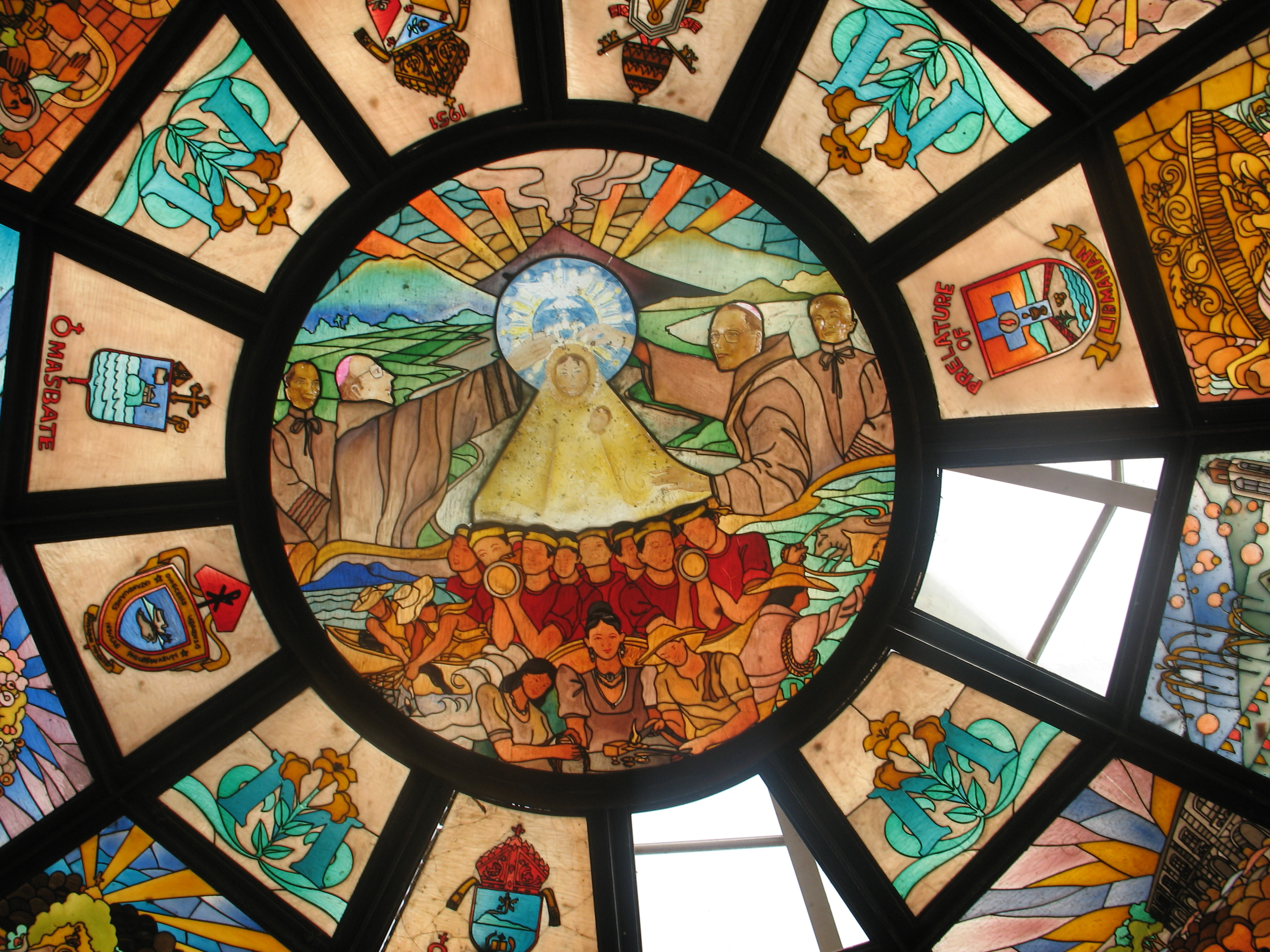
Dome interior

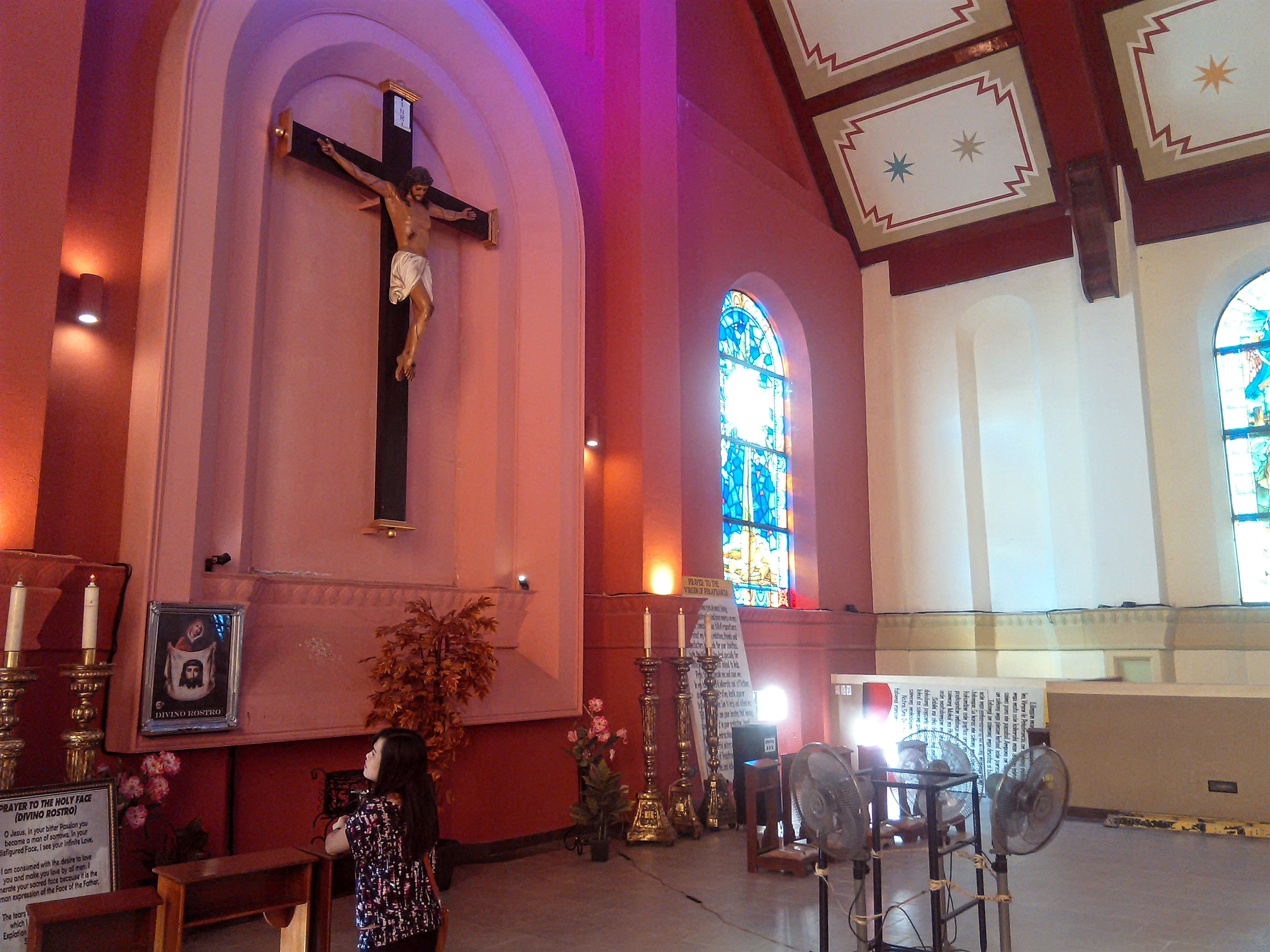
Chapel behind the image of Our Lady of Peñafrancia

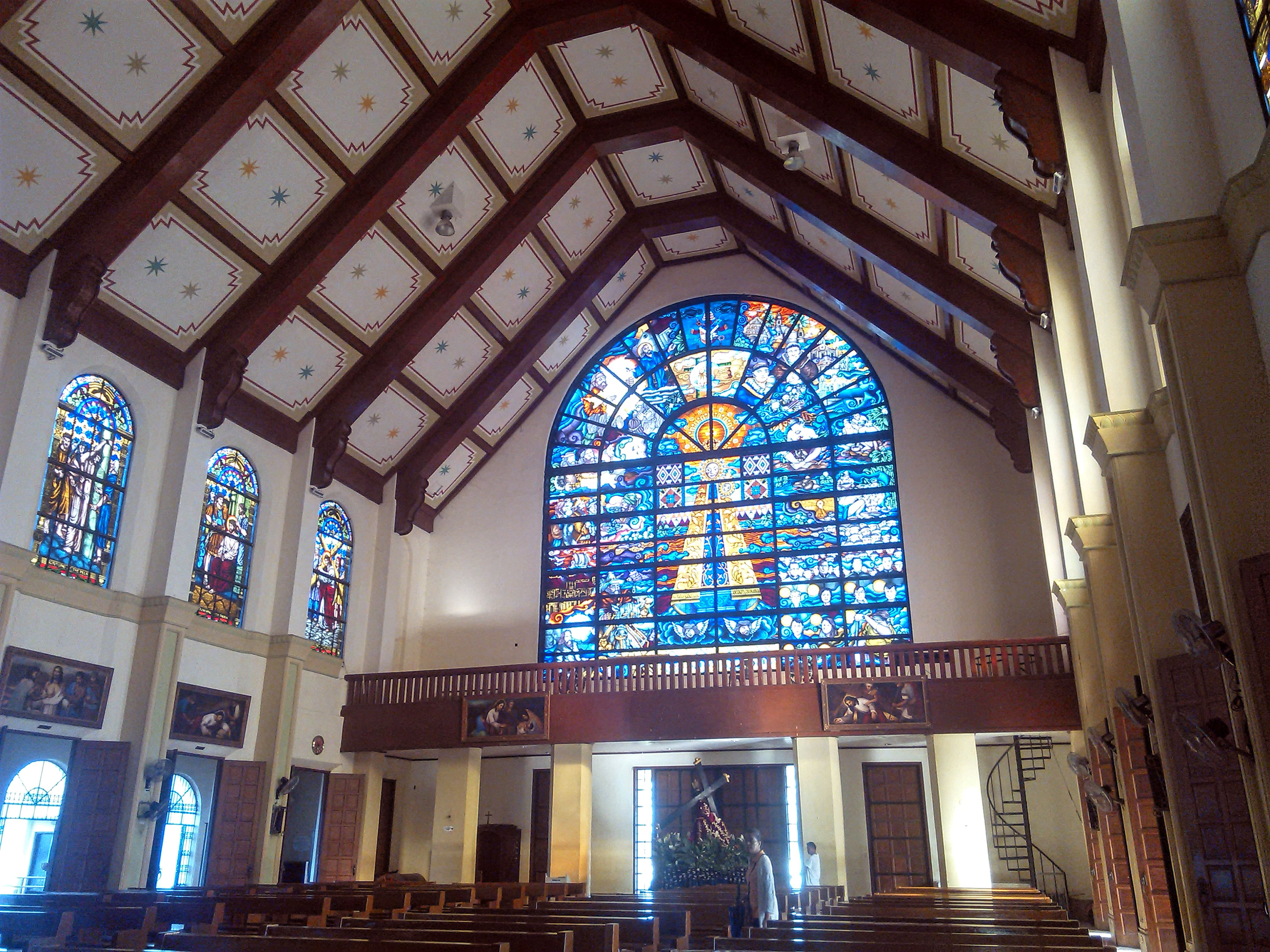
Stained glass windows and choir loft

== See also ==
- List of Christian pilgrimage sites
