= Panganiban =

Panganiban may refer to

- Panganiban (surname)
- Panganiban, Catanduanes, a municipality in the Philippines
- Jose Panganiban, Camarines Norte, a municipality in the Philippines
- Jose Maria Panganiban Monument in Naga, Camarines Sur, Philippines
