= Panganiban (surname) =

Panganiban is a Filipino surname that may refer to

- Angelica Panganiban (born 1986), Filipino film and television actress
- Artemio Panganiban (born 1937), Supreme Court Chief Justice of the Philippines
- Dominic Panganiban (born 1990), Filipino-Canadian YouTuber and animator
- José María Panganiban (1863–1890), Filipino propagandist, linguist, and essayist
  - Jose Maria Panganiban Monument in Naga, Camarines Sur, Philippines
- Jose Villa Panganiban (1903–1972), Filipino lexicographer, linguist, poet, playwright and lyricist
