= La Solidaridad =

Organization created in Spain in 1888

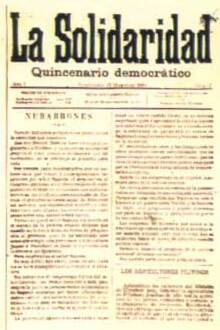
- Type: Bi-weekly newspaper
- Format: Broadsheet
- Editor: Graciano López Jaena; Marcelo H. del Pilar
- Founded: February 15, 1889
- Ceased publication: November 15, 1895
- Political alignment: Independent
- Language: Spanish
- Country: Spain

La Solidaridad (lit. The Solidarity) was an organization created in Spain on December 13, 1888. Composed of Filipino liberals exiled in 1872 and students attending Europe's universities, the organization aimed to increase Spanish awareness of the needs of its colony, the Philippines, and to propagate a closer relationship between the Philippines and Spain.

Headed by Galicano Apacible, it also issued a newspaper of the same name which was published in Barcelona, Spain on February 15, 1889. It was edited by Graciano López Jaena and later on by Marcelo H. del Pilar. The social, cultural, and economic conditions of the colonial Philippines were published in La Solidaridad. Speeches of the Spanish liberals about the Philippines were also featured in the newspaper.

== Members ==
- José Rizal (Laong Laan and Dimasalang)
- Marcelo H. del Pilar (Plaridel, Dolores Manapat, Piping Dilat, Siling Labuyo, Cupang, Maytiyaga, Patos, Carmelo, D.A. Murgas, and L.O. Crame)
- Graciano López Jaena (Diego Laura)
- Antonio Luna (Taga-Ilog)
- Mariano Ponce (Tigbalang, Kalipulako, Naning)
- José María Panganiban (Jomapa)
- Dominador Gómez (Ramiro Franco)

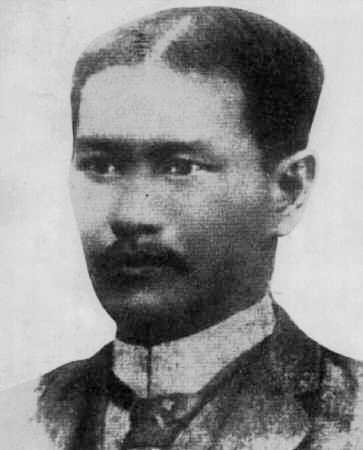
Graciano López Jaena, the first editor of La Solidaridad

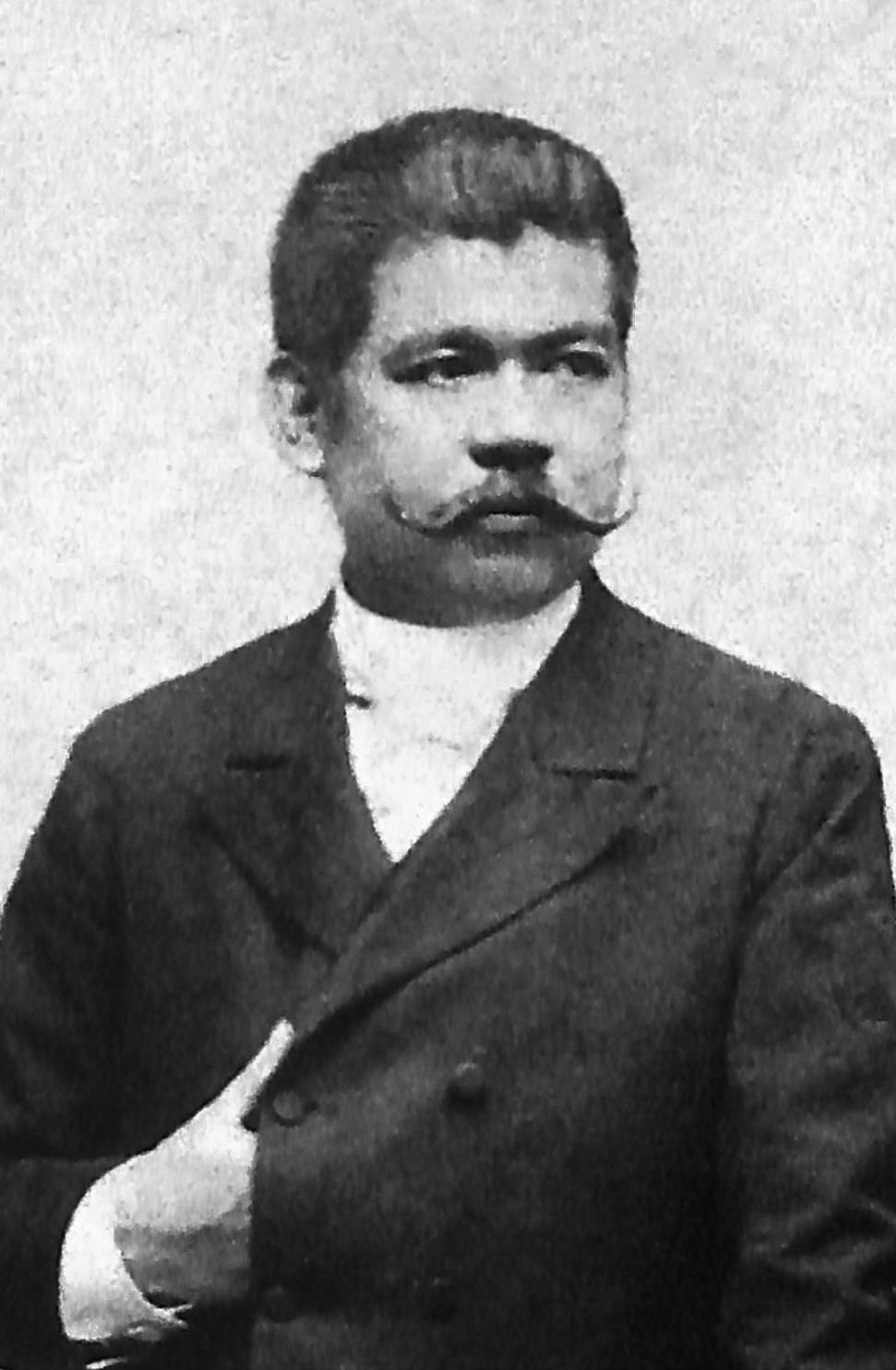
Marcelo H. del Pilar, the second and last editor of La Solidaridad

=== Other members ===
- Pedro Paterno
- Antonio María Regidor
- Isabelo de los Reyes
- Eduardo de Lete
- José Alejandrino
- Juan Luna
- Tomás Arejola
- Felix Resurrección Hidalgo
- Pedro Serrano Laktaw
- Pablo Rianzares Bautista
- Dámaso Ponce
- Galicano Apacible
- Trinidad H. Pardo de Tavera

=== International members ===
- Professor Ferdinand Blumentritt (Austrian ethnologist)
- Dr. Miguel Morayta Sagrario (Spanish historian, university professor and statesman)
- Colonel Pio de Pazos (Spanish army officer and writer)
- Juan José Cañarte (Cuban student)

Note: Some friends of the Propaganda Movement also contributed.

== History ==
La Solidaridad was established to express the goal of the Propaganda Movement towards achieving assimilation with Spain. The first issue of La Solidaridad came out on February 15, 1889. A fortnightly and a bi-weekly newspaper, La Solidaridad serves as the principal organ of the Reform Movement in Spain.

Comite de Propaganda in the Philippines funded the publication of the La Solidaridad. The editorship for the newspaper was first offered to José Rizal. However, he refused because during that time he was annotating Antonio de Morga's Sucesos de las Islas Filipinas in London. After Rizal, Graciano López Jaena was offered the editorship of La Solidaridad and he accepted.

On April 25, 1889, La Solidaridad published the letter entitled "The aspirations of the Filipinos", which was written by the Asociación Hispano-Filipina de Madrid (Hispanic Filipino Association of Madrid). It pursued desires for:

- Representation in the Cortes
- Abolition of censure
- An expressed and definite prohibition of the existing practices of exiling residents by purely administrative order, and without a writ of execution from the courts of justice.

On December 15, 1889, Marcelo H. del Pilar replaced Graciano López Jaena as the editor of La Solidaridad. Under del Pilar's editorship, the aims of the newspaper expanded. His articles caught the attention of Spanish politicians like overseas minister Manuel Becerra. Using propaganda, it pursued desires for:

- That the Philippines be a province of Spain
- Filipino priests instead of Spanish friars — Augustinians, Dominicans, and Franciscans — in parishes and remote sitios
- Freedom of assembly and speech
- Equal rights before the law (for both Filipino and Spanish plaintiffs)

After years of publication from 1889 to 1895, funding of the La Solidaridad became scarce. Comite de Propaganda's contribution to the newspaper stopped and del Pilar funded the newspaper almost on his own. Penniless in Spain, del Pilar stopped the publication of La Solidaridad on November 15, 1895, with 7 volumes and 160 issues. In del Pilar's farewell editorial, he said :

Facing the obstacles that the reactionary persecutions bring in opposition to the circulation of this newspaper in the Philippines, we have to suspend our publication for some time. Nowadays, when there are ways to curb difficulties, we will not stop working to overcome them. We are persuaded that no sacrifices are too little to win the rights and the liberty of a nation that is oppressed by slavery. We work within the law and thus will we continue publishing this newspaper whether here or abroad, depending on the exigencies of the fight wherein Filipino reactionaries have come to impress upon all Filipinos that in its soul there beats some sentiment of dignity and shame. Whether here or abroad, we will continue developing our program.

== Notable contributors ==
Several writers contributed to La Solidaridad over its six years of existence, like Antonio Luna, Anastacio Carpio, Mariano Ponce, Antonio María Regidor, José María Panganiban, Isabelo de los Reyes, Eduardo de Lete, José Alejandrino, and Pedro Paterno. One of the most prolific contributors though was Rizal's confidant Ferdinand Blumentritt, whose impassioned defense of the Filipino interests was said to have been inspirational to the other writers and the readers of the newspaper alike.

== Del Pilar's articles, essays, and editorials published in La Solidaridad ==
=== 1889 ===
- Our Purpose.—No.1: February 15, 1889. Editorial. López Jaena and del Pilar
- The Teaching of Spanish in the Philippines.—No.1: February 15, 1889. Anonymous.
- Are The Philippines Going To Ruin?—No.2: February 28, 1889. Anonymous.
- Thunderclouds.—No.3: March 31, 1889.Editorial.
- 100.00—12.50---X... No.4: March 31, 1889. Anonymous.
- The Philippine Press.—No.5: April 15, 1889. Anonymous.
- Primary Instruction.—No5: April 15, 1889. Anonymous.
- The Lion's Share.—No.6: April 30, 1889. Anonymous.
- Attempted Rebellion!—No.7: May 15, 1889 Anonymous.
- Tax Collection System.—No.8: May 31, 1889. Anonymous.
- A Warning.—No.8: May 31, 1889. Anonymous.
- Manila Custom House.—No.9: June 15, 1889. Anonymous.
- Go Ahead, Sr. Becerra.—No.10: June 30, 1889. Anonymous.
- An Important Hiatus.—No.10: June 30, 1889. Anonymous.
- The Philippine Budget.—No.11: June 15, 1889. Anonymous.
- The Political Situation in Europe.—No.12: July 31, 1889. Anonymous.
- Philippine Municipalities.—No.13: August 15, 1889. Anonymous.
- International Conspiracy.—No.14: August 31, 1889. Editorial.
- Echoes from Outremer: Municipal Elections.—o.15: September 15, 1889. Anonymous.
- Assimilation of the Philippines.—No.16: September 30, 1889.
- A Vexatious Measure Repealed. NO.17: October 15, 1889. Anonymous.
- Sr. Becerra's Reforms.—No.18: October 31, 1889.
- A Vote of Thanks.—No.19: November 15, 1889. Editorial.
- Manila Topics.—No.20: November 30, 1889. Editorial.
- Frustrated Machinations.—No.21: December 15, 1889. Editorial.
- The Outgoing Year.—No.22. December 31, 1889. Editorial.

=== 1890 ===
- The Incoming Year.—No.23: January 15, 1890. Editorial.
- Superfluous and Injurious Guaranty.—No.23: January 15, 1890. Anonymous.
- The Civil Register.—No.24: February 1 (January 31), 1890. Editorial.
- We Are Taking Note.—No.25: February 15, 1890. Editorial.
- The Patience of Sr. Becerra.—No.26: February 28, 1890. Editorial.
- Parliamentary Representation for the Philippines.—No.27: March 15, 1890. Editorial.
- Bismarck's Downfall.—No.29/; April 15, 1890. Editorial.
- Electoral Regime for the Philippines.—No.32: May 31, 1890. Editorial.
- Parliamentary Regime for the Philippines.—No.33: June 15, 1890. Editorial.
- Pasce Agnos Meos...--No.34: June 30, 1890.—With pseudonym Carmelo. Editorial.
- Political Review.—No.35: July 15, 1890. Editorial.
- The Caroline Islands.—No.37: August 15, 1890. Editorial.
- General Jovellar.—No.41: October 15, 1890. Editorial.
- The Asociación Hispano-Filipina.—Nno.42: October 31, 1890. Editorial.
- It Defeats Its Own Purpose.—No.43: November 15, 1890. Editorial.
- More Concerning Deportations.—No.44: November 30, 1890.
- A Glance Over the Political Field.—No.45: December 15, 1890.

=== 1891 ===
- We Hope So!—No.48: January 31, 1891. Editorial.
- Of Present Interest.—No.49: February 15, 1891. Editorial.
- (Address Delivered at the Banquet Given by the Asociación Hispano-Filipina in Honor of Sr. Becerra).—No.49: February 15, 1891.
- Now, Let Us See.—No.50: February 28, 1891. Editorial.
- The Speech from the Throne.—No.51: March 15, 1891. Editorial.
- The Aurora of Redemption.—No.52: March 31, 1891. Editorial.
- The Philippine Coastwise Trade.--No. 54: April 30, 1891. Editorial.
- Let Us Be Just.—No. 54 April 30, 1891
- The Redemption of the Philippines.—No.55: May 15, 1891. Editorial.
- To the Congreso de Diputados.—No.58: June 30, 1891.
- (Memorial signed by the Board of Directors of the Asociación Hispano-Filipina, Madrid, May 31, 1891).
- The Logic of the Facts.—No.61: August 15, 1891. Editorial.
- Our Desires.—No.64: September 30, 1891. Editorial.
- On the Way.—No.65: October 15, 1891. Anonymous.
- Culture?—No.66: October 31, 1891.
- Review of the Fortnight.—Nos.66 (October 31), 67 (November 15), 68 (November 30), 69 (December 15), 70 (December 31), 1891; 71 (January 15), 72 (January 31), 73 (February 15), 74 (February 29), 75 (March 15), 76 (March 31), 77 (April 15), 78 (April 30), 79 (May 15), 80 (May 31), 81 (June 15), 82 (June 30), 83 (July 15), 84 (August 1), 86 (September 1), 1892.
- Clerical Conflict in the Philippines.—No.67: November 15, 1891.

=== 1892 ===
- Special Law on Brigandage.—NO.69 (December 15), 70 (December 31), 1891; 71 (January 15), and 73 (February 15), 1892.
- The Calamba Affair.—No.73: February 15, 1892. Anonymous.
- Spirit of Association?—No.74: February 29, 1892. With pseudonym Patós.
- Hostility Towards Spain.—No.75: March 15, 1892.
- It is Imperative.—No.76: March 31, 1892.
- General Despujols.—No.77: April 15, 1892. Editorial.
- Plorans Ploravit.—No.81: June 30, 1892.
- What a Pity!—No.82: June 30, 1892.
- Carlism.—No.83: July 15, 1892. Editorial.
- Cabezas de Barangay.—No.86: September 1 (August 31), 1892.
- Municipal Legislation.—Nos.87: (September 15) and 88: (September 30), 1892. Editorials.
- Defeating Its Own Purpose.—No.87: September 15, 1892.
- Common Sense.—No.88: September 30, 1892.
- The Freethinkers’ Congress.—No.89: October 15, 1892. With pseudonym Plaridel.
- Neoautonomy.—No.89: October 15, 1892.
- Carried Forward.—No.90: October 31, 1892. Editorial.
- Eternal Denouncer!—No.90: October 31, 1892.
- The Philippine Budget.—No.91: November 15, 1892. Editorial.
- The Neoautonomists.—No.91: November 15, 1892.
- Despujols and Mokery.--No.92: November 30, 1892. Editorial.
- Is it About Time!—No.93: December 15, 1892. Editorial.
- The Peace Budget.—No.93: December 15, 1892.

=== 1893 ===
- We Insist.—No.95: January 15, 1893. Editorial.
- Philippine Problems.—Nos.96 (January 31), 97 (February 15), 98 (February 28), 99 (March 15), 100 (March 21), 102 (April 30), 103 (May 15), and 105 (June 15), 1893. Editorials.
- Africanization of the Philippines.—No.97: February 15, 1893.
- Antifilipino Monomania.—No.98: February 28, 1893. With pseudonym Plaridel
- Contra te Laboras.—No.98: February 28, 1893.
- Let Us Disillusion Ourselves!—No.100: March 31, 1893.
- The Philippines in the Speech from the Throne.—No.101: April 15, 1893. Editorial.
- Parliamentary Contflict.—No.103: May 15, 1893.
- Maura's Reform.—Nos.104 (May 31), 106 (June 30), 107 (July 15), 108 (July 31), 109 (August 15), and 110 (August 31), 1893. Editorials.
- How Small!...—No.107: July 15, 1893.
- Garcia Gomez’ Proposition.—No.108: July 31, 1893.
- The Truth of the Matter.—No.110: August 31, 1893. Editorial.
- Philippine Masonry.—No.111: September 15, 1893.
- Poor Spain!—No.112: September 30, 1893
- Padre Jose Rodriguez.—No.112: September 30, 1893.
- A Great Imprudence.—No. 113: October 15, 1893. Editorial.
- The Attitude of the Philippines.—No. 114: October 31, 1893. Editorial.
- It Settles Nothing.—No. 114: October 31, 1893.
- Carlism in the Philippines.—Nos. 114 (October 31), 115 (November 15), 116 (November 30), 117 (December 15), and 118 (December 31), 1893.
- What is Enough and What is too Much.—No. 116: November 15, 1893. Editorial.
- Masonry and Monkery in the Philippines.—No.117: December 13, 1893.
- Another Fiasco.—No. 118: December 31, 1893.

=== 1894 ===
- New Life, New Rights.—No. 119: January 15, 1894. Editorial.
- A Chat.—No. 119: January 15, 1894.
- The Sensible Thing.—No. 120: January 31, 1894. Editorial.
- Not that Either.—No. 120: January 31, 1894.
- Tutelar Regime.—Nos. 121: February 15, 1894, Editorial; and 125: April 15, 1894.
- Mindanao.—No. 121: February 15, 1894.
- Of Capital Interest.—No. 122: February 28, 1894. Editorial.
- A Practical Case.—No. 122: February 28, 1894.
- The Crisis.—No, 123: March 15, 1894. Editorial.
- Mindanao Again.—No. 124: March 31, 1894. Editorial.
- Let There Be No More Bloodshed.—No.124: March 31, 1894.
- The Defeat of the Government.—No, 124: March 31, 1894. Editorial.
- The Spanish Peregrination.—No. 125: April 15, 1894. With pseudonym Plaridel.
- Attention!—No. 126: April 30, 1894. Editorial.
- The Crisis of Carlism.—No.126: April 30, 1894.
- Abolition of the Tutelar Regime in the Philippines.—No. 127: May 15, 1894.
- What the Monkery Costs US.—No. 127: May 15, 1894.
- Padre Font.—No. 127: May 15, 1894. With pseudonym Plaridel.
- The Civil Register for the Philippines.—No. 128: May 31, 1894. Editorial.
- Will the Philippine Budget be Submitted to the Cortes?—No. 128: May 31, 1894.
- Friar Regime vs. Monkery.—No. 128: May 31, 1894.
- Retirement of a New Type.—No. 129: June 15, 1894.
- Brutal Autocracy.—No. 129: June 15, 1894.
- Hongkong and the Philippines.—No. 130: June 30, 1894. Editorial.
- Emilio Junoy.—No.130, June 30, 1894. Editorial.
- Mindanao.—Nos. 132 (July 31), 134 (August 31), 138 (October 31), 1894, and 150 (April 30), 1895. Editorial.
- The Philippine Augustinians.—No. 132: July 31, 1894.
- China and Japan.—No. 133: August 15, 1894. Editorial.
- The Time Has Come.—No.133: August 15, 1894.
- Abuse of the Friary against the Friars of the Philippine Islands.—No.134: August 31, 1894.
- We Agree.—No. 135: September 15, 1894.
- Dangerous Alliances.—No.136: September 30, 1894. Editorial.
- The Shod Augustinians of the Philippines: Treatise by Padre Font.—No.136: September 30, 1894.
- Padre Font's Treatise on the Shod Augustinians of the Philippines.—No. 137: October 15, 1894.
- The Spanish-Japanese Treaty.—No. 138: October 31, 1894. Editorial.
- The Latest Crisis: Don Buenaventura Abarzuza, Minister of Ultramar.—No.139: November 15, 1894. Editorial.
- Spain and Japan in the Philippines.—Nos. 139 (November 15), 140 (November 30), 141 (December 15), 142 (December 31), 1894; (January 31), and 145 (February 15), 1895.
- Race Prestige.—No. 140: November 30, 1894.
- Political Review.—No. 141: December 15, 1894.
- Free Press.—No.141: December 15, 1894.
- The Usual Thing.—No. 142: December 31, 1894.
- Human Interest and the Interest of the Fatherland.—No.142: December 31, 1894.

=== 1895 ===
- Señor Moret's Lecture.—No.143: January 15, 1895. Editorial.
- To the Filipinos: Arbitrary Deportations: Defence against this Peril.—No. 143: January 15, 1895.
- The Problem of the Antilles: Lectures in the Ateneo: D. Rafael Maria de Labra.— No.143: January 15, 1895.
- Monetary Solutions.—No.144: January 31, 1895.
- To Our Impugner.—No. 144: January 31, 1895.
- Yalu and the Conference of the German Emperor.—No. 145: February 15, 1895.
- A Wise Formula.—No. 148: March 31, 1895. Editorial.
- Perils and Fears.-Nos. 150 (April 30) and 151 (May 15), 1895. Editorials.
- The Vindication of the Philippines.—No. 152: May 31, 1895. Editorial.
- The Calle de la Montera Convention for the Normalization of the Exchange with the Philippines.—No. 153: June 15, 1895.
- A Correction.—No. 154: June 30, 1895. Editorial.
- Religion.—No. 155: July 15, 1895. Editorial.
- An Alarming Question.—No.155: July 15, 1895.
- Force and Intrigue.—No.156:; July 31, 1895.
- Viewpoints.—No.158; August 31, 1895. Editorial.
- To Those Who Govern, and Those Who Are Governed, in the Philippines.—No. 158: August 31, 1895.
- A Serious Danger.—No.159: September 15, 1895. Editorial.
- Treaty for the Establishment of Boundary Lines between Spain and Japan in the Far East.—No.160: November 15, 1895. Editorial.
- Little, but Expensive.—No. 160: November 15, 1895.

== See also ==
- Philippine literature in Spanish
- Philippine Revolution
