= José María Panganiban =

Filipino writer (1863–1890)

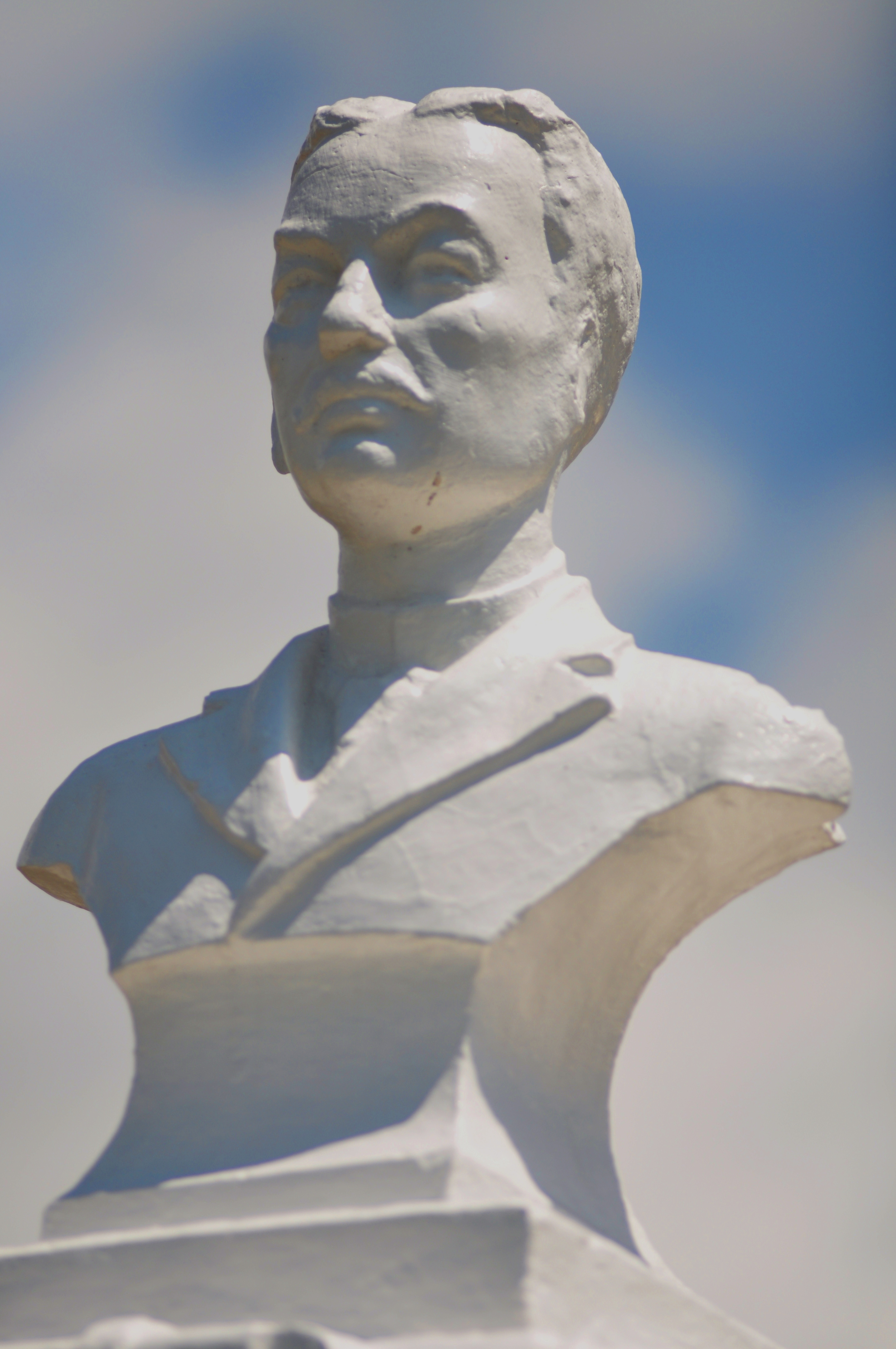
- Born: José María Panganiban y Enverga; February 1, 1863; Mambulao, Camarines, Captaincy General of the Philippines, Spanish Empire
- Died: August 19, 1890 (aged 27); Barcelona, Spain
- Monuments: Jose Panganiban, Daet, and Naga, Camarines Sur
- Other names: Jomapa, J.M.P.
- Education: Holy Rosary Seminary, Colegio de San Juan de Letran, University of Santo Tomas, University of Barcelona
- Occupations: Writer, journalist
- Organization(s): La Solidaridad, Asociacion Hispano-Filipina, Free Masonry
- Movement: Philippine Revolution

Jose Ma. Panganiban y Enverga (February 1, 1863 – August 19, 1890) was a Filipino propagandist, linguist, and essayist. He is one of the main writers and contributors for La Solidaridad, writing under the pen names "Jomapa" and "J.M.P."

== Early life ==
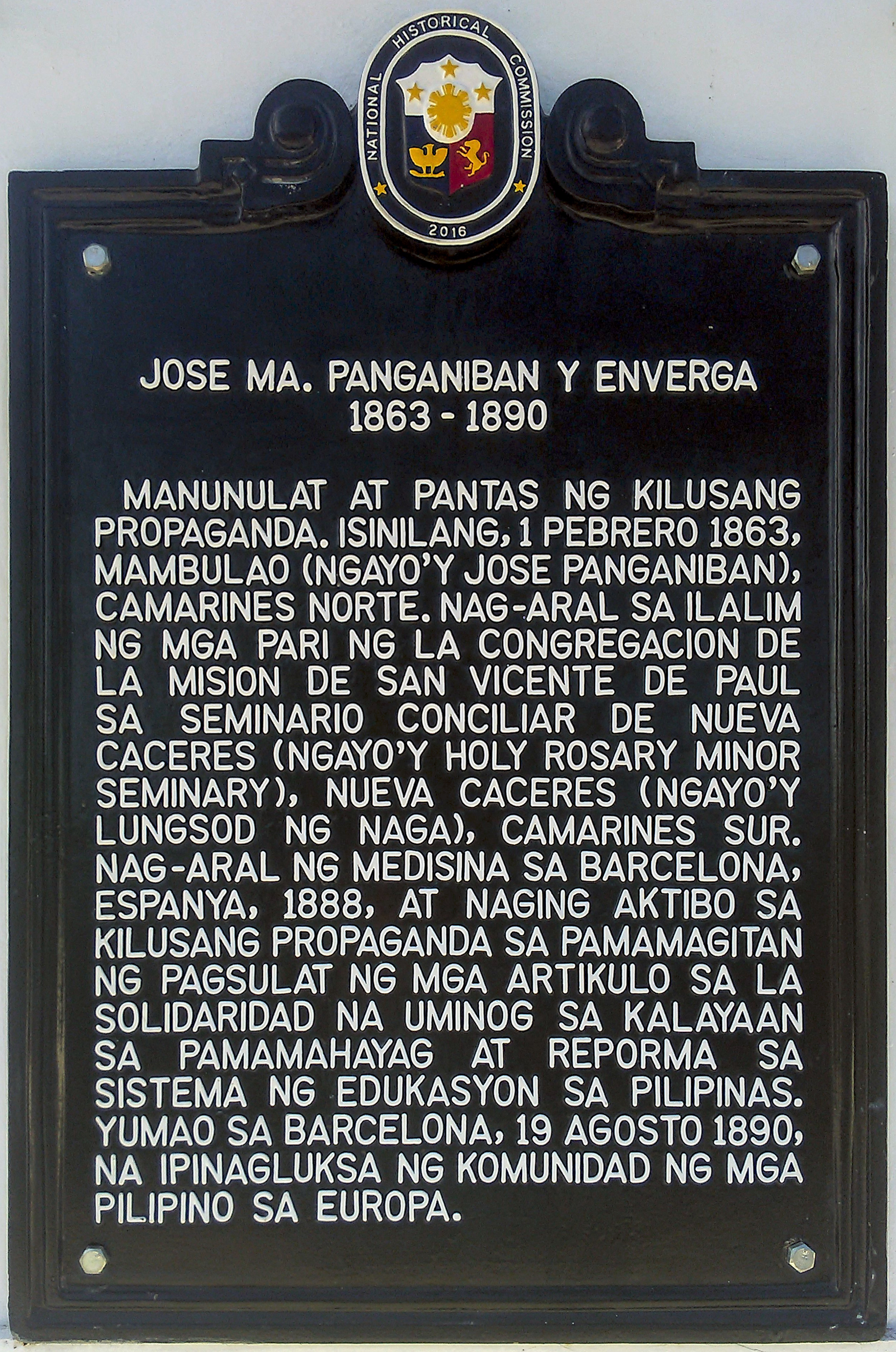
Historical marker installed in 2016 in Naga City, Camarines Sur

Jose Ma. Panganiban was born on February 1, 1863, in Bangkal Phase II, Mambulao (a town which was subsequently renamed after him). He was the eldest of the three sons of Vicente Panganiban, originally from Hagonoy, Bulacan, and Juana Enverga, a native of Mauban, Quezon.

Panganiban developed his interest in reading at an early age from reading the cartilla, caton and catecismo taught by his mother. Once, his mother found him under a tree, sleeping beside a copy of Don Quixote, the book of Cervantes.

Since his mother died when he was a little boy, Panganiban grew up in the care of his father, the clerk of court in Daet, the capital town of the province. His father sent him to the Holy Rosary Seminary (El Seminario del Santissimo Rosario) of Nueva Caceres (now Naga City, Camarines Sur) and became the protégé of the seminary rector Fr. Santoja. He earned the praises of his teachers because of his aptitude to easily absorb his lessons. At 12, he mastered Latin and Spanish and at 15, the Classics and Natural Sciences.

He was good at writing and was articulate in expressing his ideas. Because of this, the Spanish Governor-General who happened to be visiting the province and heard him speak during a school program commended him. In April 1878, he wrote A Nuestro Obispo in honor of Bishop Francisco Gainza who was on a visit to Mambulao. Unknown to many of his fellow Bicolanos was Panganiban’s superior academic credentials as a student at the seminary with grades of sobresaliente (excellent) in all subjects.

Father Santoja became instrumental for Panganiban’s studies in Manila. The priest recommended him to the Colegio de San Juan de Letran where he obtained his degree of Bachelor of Arts in 1883. Wanting to become a medical practitioner, he took up medical courses at the University of Santo Tomas and at the same time taking vocational courses in agriculture at Letran so that in 1885, he received the title of Agricultural Expert. While at the university in 1887, he wrote Anatomia de Regines which was recognized as one of his brilliant literary works. His papers on general pathology, therapeutics and surgical anatomy was also awarded prizes.

An anthology of his works was gathered by Fr. Gregorio Echevarria, rector of University of Santo Tomas, and sent to be exhibited at the 1887 Exposicion General de Filipinas in Madrid.

== Activities for the Propaganda Movement ==
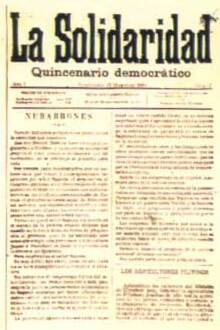
La Solidaridad

In May 1888, Panganiban sailed for Spain and continued his medical studies at the University of Barcelona, Spain, where he met other Filipino propagandists agitating for reforms in the colony. He joined reformist groups such as the Asociacion Hispano-Filipina and La Solidaridad because he believed in instituting reforms in the Philippines, and used the pen names "Jomapa" and "J.M.P."

On April 25, 1889 Panganiban signed a petition addressed to the Spanish Minister of Colonies, requesting Filipino representation in the Spanish Cortes. While in Spain, he learned other languages including German, Italian, and French, adding to the Spanish and Latin that he learned during his student days in the seminary of Nueva Caceres (Naga City, Camarines Sur). He was able to translate into Spanish the book of German author Carl Julius Weber entitled: Die Religio und Die Religionen (Religion and Other Religions).

Being one of the writers of the La Solidaridad, he called the attention of the Spaniards on the freedom of the press and criticized the educational system in the Philippines. His works were recognized by Jose Rizal who even said "He was a true orator, of easy and energetic words, vigorous in concepts and of practical and transcendental ideas". Among the articles he published were "El Pensamiento", "La Universidad de Manila: Su Plan de Estudio", and "Los Nuevos Ayuntamientos de Filipinas". He continued to write poems and short stories, including "Ang Lupang Tinubuan", "Noches en Mambulao", "Sa Aking buhay", "Bahia de Mambulao", "La Mejerde Oro", "Amor mio", "Clarita Perez" and "Kandeng".

== Death ==
Panganiban contracted tuberculosis and apologized to Rizal that he could not help further in the movement. He confided in Rizal that, "If I only have the strength I had before, I will work with you unto the bitter end". It is a measure of Panganiban’s patriotism and his dedication to the cause that despite the rigors of poverty and the ravages of tuberculosis, he persisted till the end in the struggle of reforms.

On August 19, 1890, he died in his boarding house at No. 2 Rambla de Canaletas, Barcelona. He was buried in grave No. 2043 of the Southwest Cemetery of Barcelona. His grave has the epitaph: Here lies the avenger of the honor of the Filipinos, written by Graciano Lopez Jaena."

The Filipino propagandists in Europe mourned Panganiban’s death. Jose Rizal eulogized Panganiban as an "excellent companion of labor and difficulty... endowed with uncommon talent, with privileged intelligence, and with indefatigable industry, (he) was one of the sacred, legitimate hopes of his unfortunate country.... What should be grieved at is the thought that he died without finishing the noble mission which his exceptional faculties had destined for him."

Dr. Domingo Abella, a historian, located the remains of his province mate in Spain and brought them back to the Philippines. His remains now lie inside the pedestal of the Jose Ma. Panganiban Monument, installed by the National Historical Institute at Jose Panganiban, Camarines Norte.

== Legacy ==
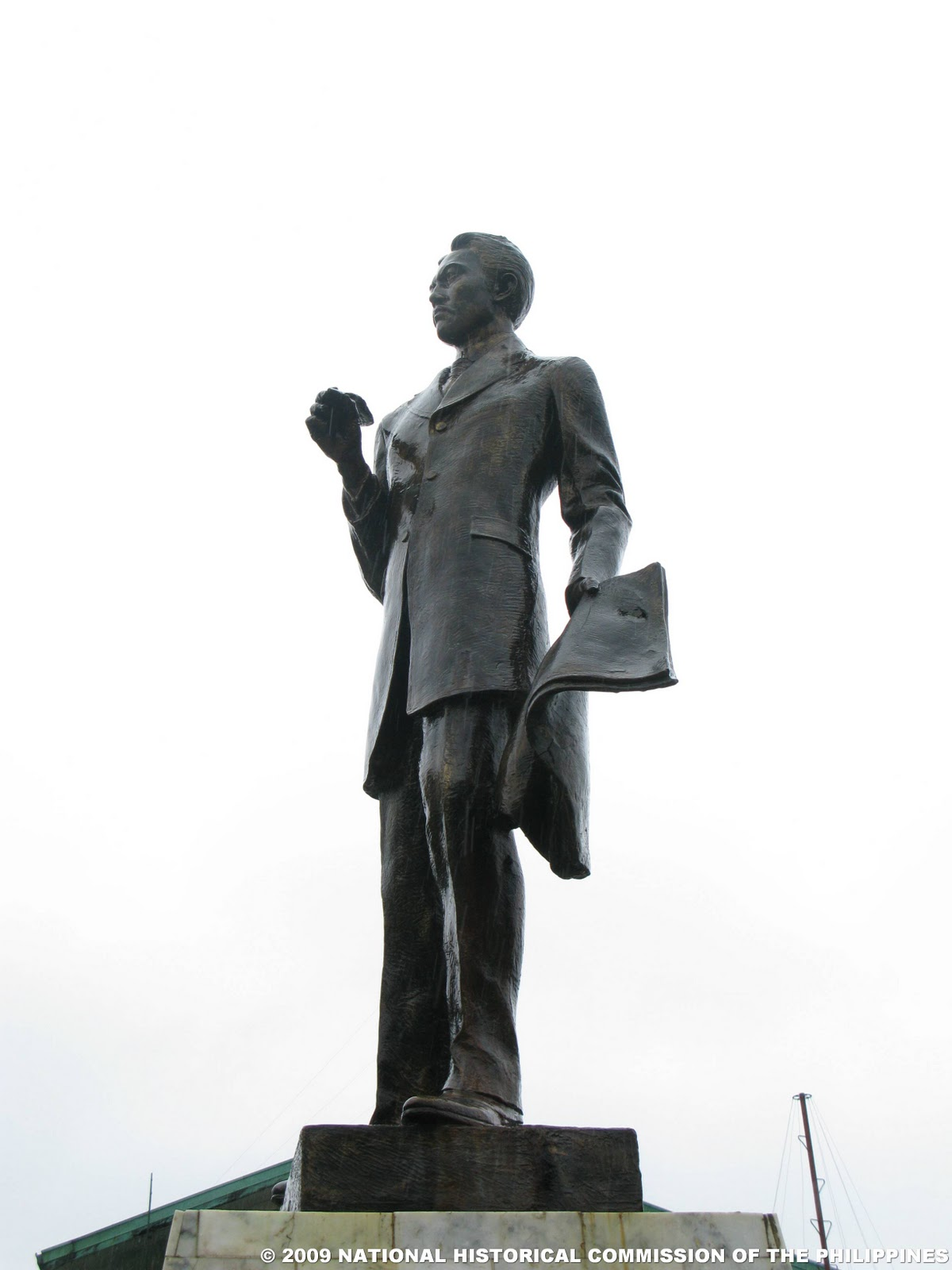
JOMAPA monument in front of the municipal building

- The town of Panganiban in present-day Catanduanes was established as part of Albay in honor of Panganiban by virtue of Executive Order No. 55 signed by Governor-General Francis Burton Harrison on January 1, 1921.
- The town of Mambulao, Camarines Norte, was renamed to Jose Panganiban in honor of its native son by Act No. 4155 issued on December 1, 1934.
- Panganiban Drive (formerly Calle de Legaspi), one of Naga City's main avenues at the very heart of the city, connecting Elias Angeles Street (formerly Calle Real) and the Pan-Philippine Highway.
- President Emilio Aguinaldo cited the country's appreciation of Panganiban's patriotic labors in his opening address at the Congress assembled at Malolos City, Bulacan on September 15, 1898, he (Pres. Aguinaldo) invoked the spirits of the departed heroes of the Fatherland, saying:

Illustrious spirits of Rizal, Lopez Jaena, of Marcelo del Pilar! August shades of Burgos, Pelaez and PANGANIBAN! Warlike geniuses of Aguinaldo (Crispulo-O.), and Tirona, of Natividad and Evangelista! Arise a moment from your unknown graves!

== Monuments ==
Jose Maria Panganiban monument in front of Hagonoy Central School (gabaldon) Hagonoy, Bulacan, However, it was transferred elsewhere when the said school was demolished.

- Jose Maria Panganiban Monument - at Naga Central School 1, Naga City, Camarines Sur.
- Jose Maria Panganiban Monument - a bronze statue (9 ft. tall) installed on February 1, 1985, by the National Historical Institute in his home town Jose Panganiban, Camarines Norte, which contains the remains.
- Jose Maria Panganiban Monuments - at the lobby of Provincial Capitol and at the Provincial Capitol Grounds, Daet, Camarines Norte
