= Holy Rosary Seminary =

Christian seminary in the Philippines

Coordinates: 13.6279°N 123.1864°E

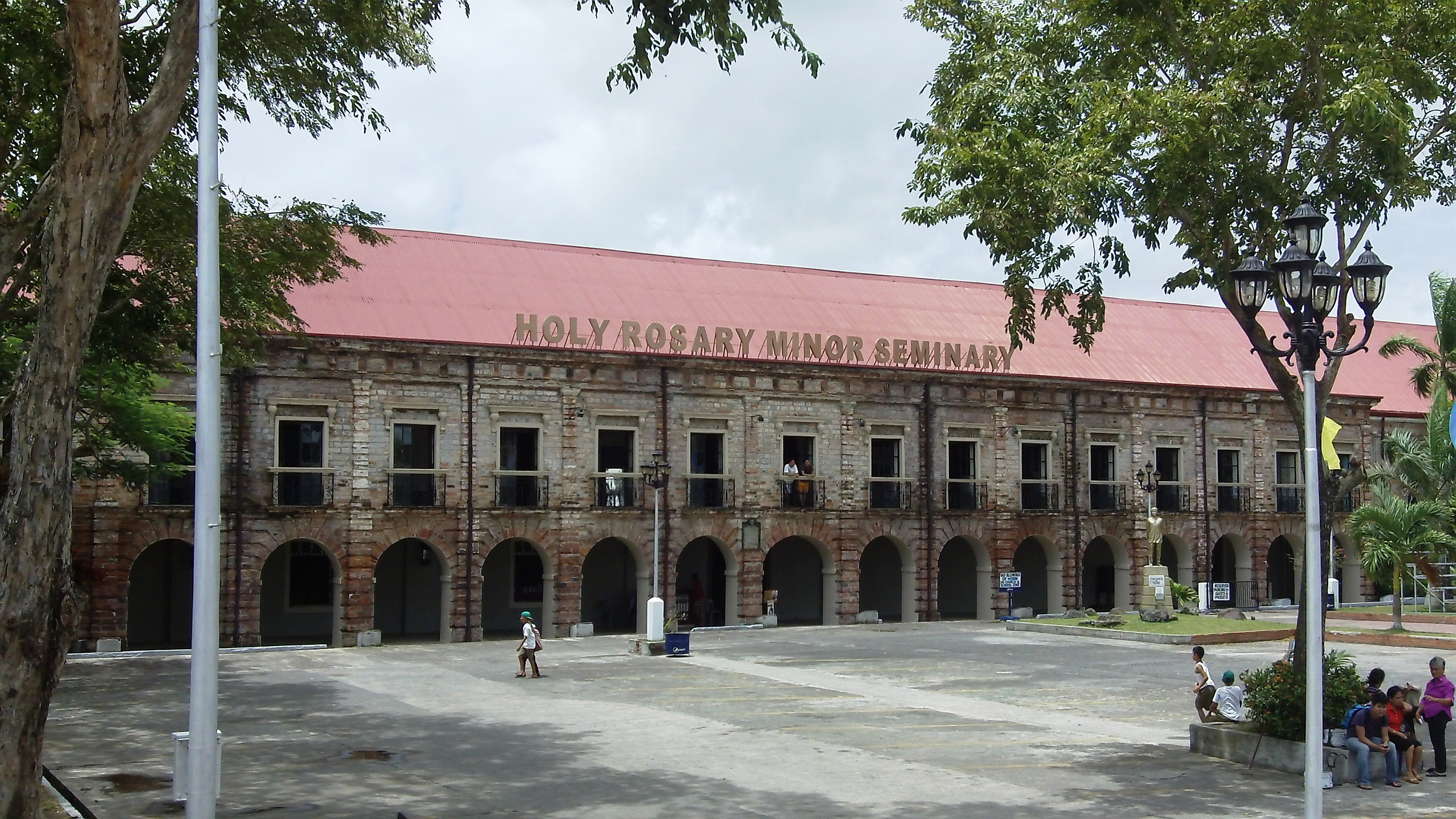
- Motto: Virtus et Scientia
- Type: Private
- Established: 1797
- Rector: Mario Arnulfo B. Gaite
- Principal: Orfelina O. Tuy
- Students: 114
- Location: P.O. Box 8710, Elias Angeles Street, Naga, Camarines Sur, Philippines
- Campus: Suburban
- Colors: Gold and black
- Nickname: Rosarians

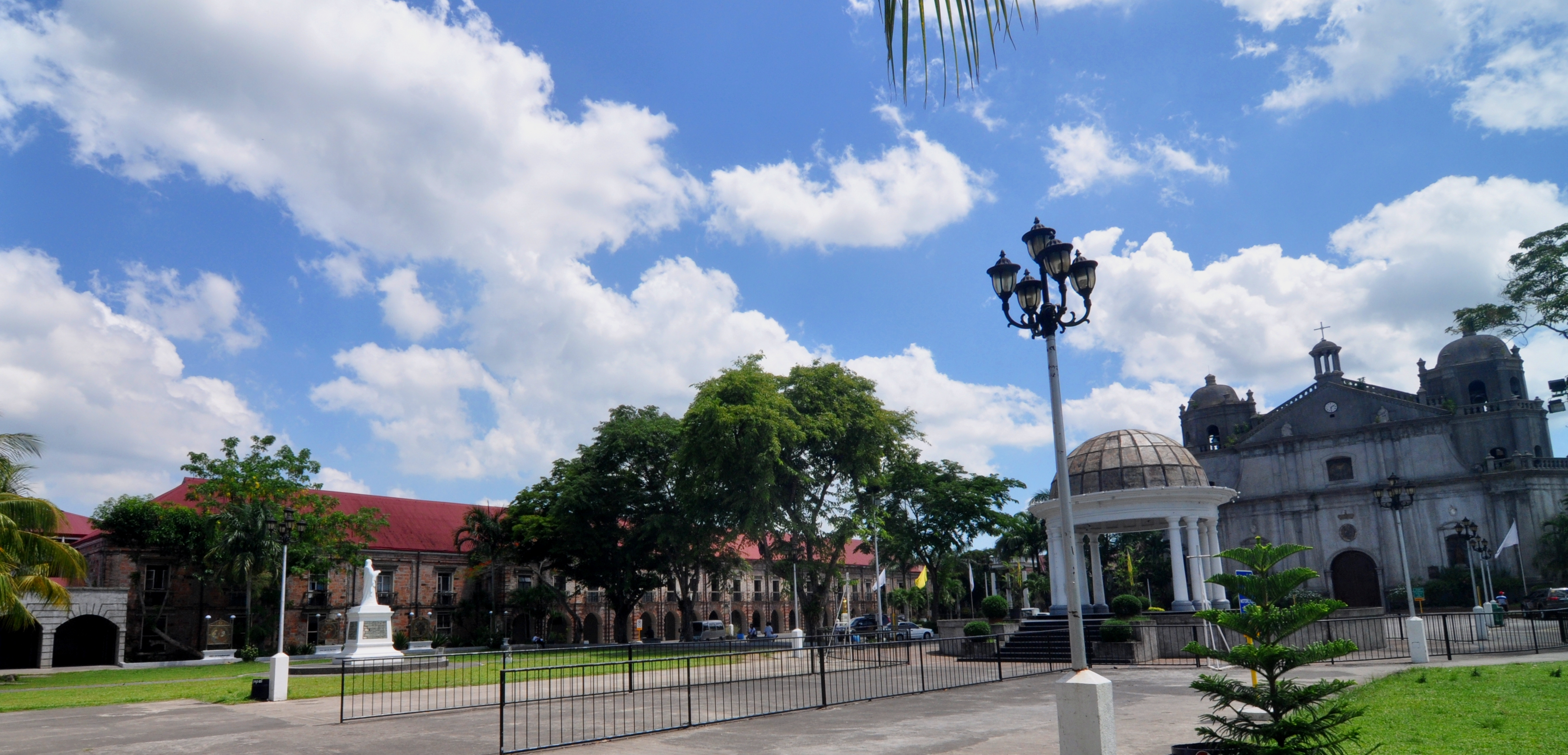
Holy Rosary Minor Seminary and Naga Metropolitan Cathedral grounds

Holy Rosary Minor Seminary (also named Seminario del Santisimo Rosario) is a Roman Catholic seminary or a house of formation for high school and college would-be priests run by the Archdiocese of Caceres in Naga, Camarines Sur, in the Philippines.

== History ==
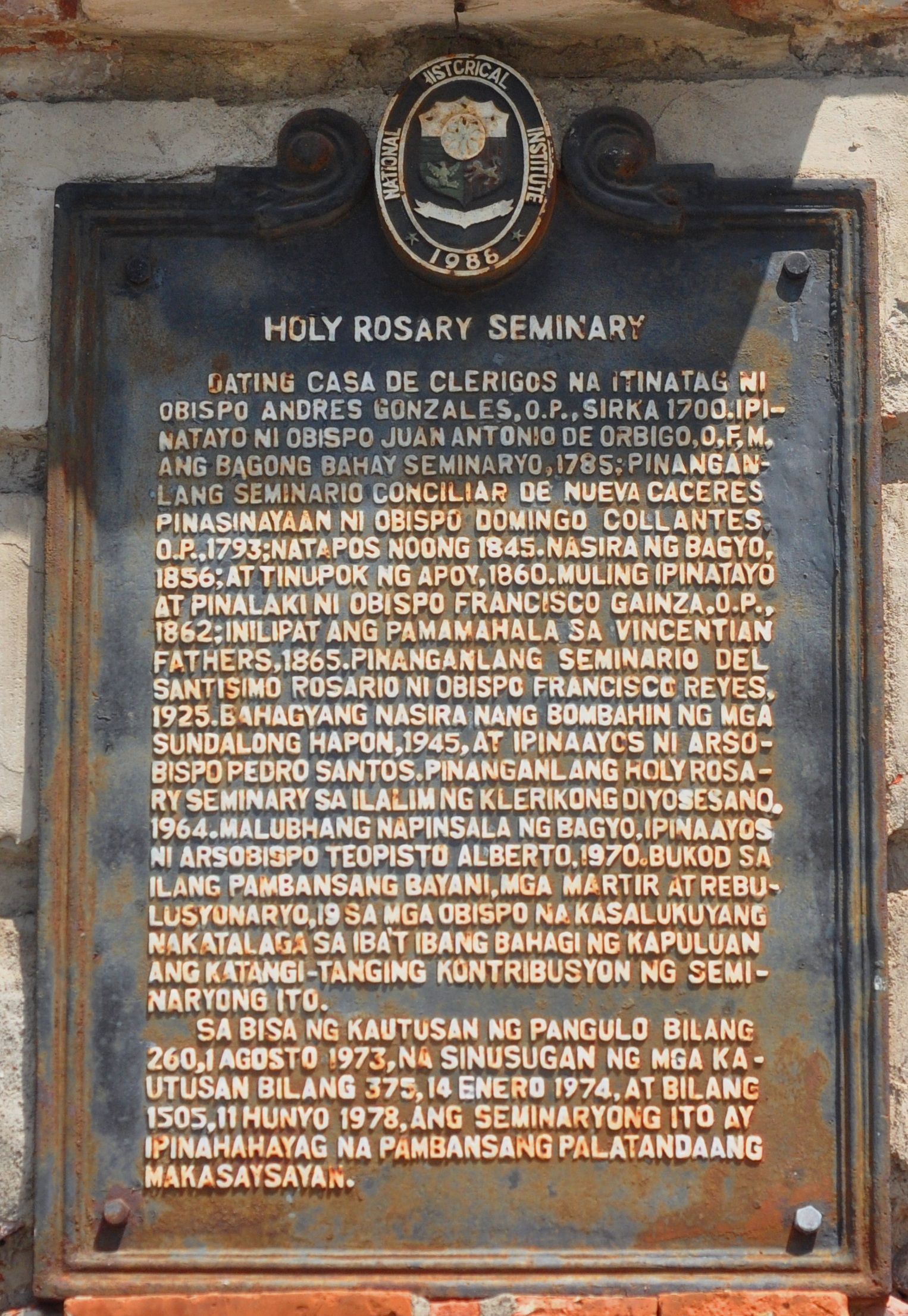
National Historical Landmark marker

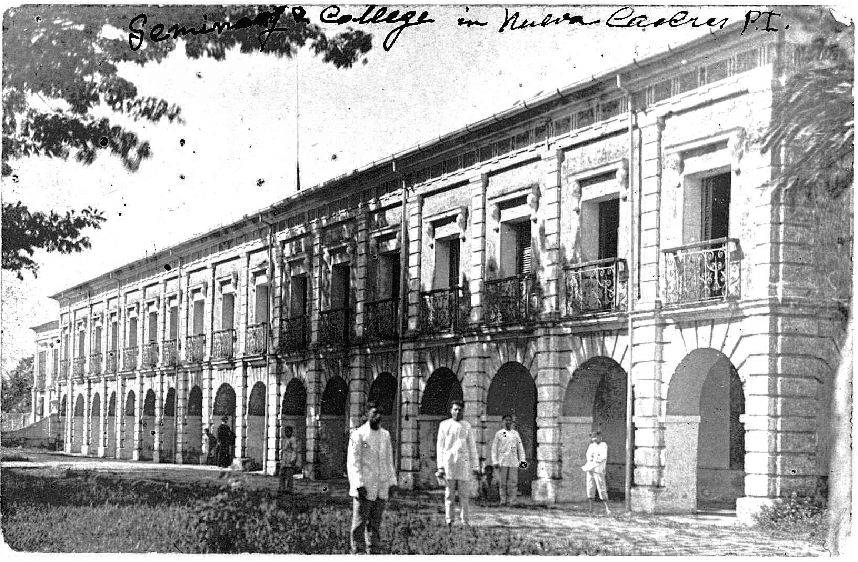
Photograph of the Holy Rosary Minor Seminary. August 13, 1913.

Founded on March 7, 1793 by Archbishop Antonio Gallego of Manila, Holy Rosary Minor Seminary started as Casa de Clerigos (House of Clerics) in a place called Padian (now, Caceres St.) near the Bicol River. It was canonically erected as Seminario Conciliar de Nueva Caceres in compliance with the Tridentine Decree that every diocese must have a seminary. In 1840, it was transferred from Padian to its present site along Elias Angeles St. When the seminary building opened in 1793 it was made of wood, bamboo and nipa which a certain bishop noted as "combustible and of non-durable materials". The initial staff was composed of a rector (provisor and vicar general of the diocese); a vice-rector(a Franciscan professor) and two other professors who taught Latin and Humanities. In nine years after its opening, it had 11 deacons, 24 subdeacon and 247 minor seminarians. In 1855, the seminary building was damaged by a strong earthquake and a fire razed it the ground in 1863. In 1865, Nueva Caceres Bishop Francisco Gainza rebuilt and expanded the new seminary building. The Vincentian Fathers (C.M.) took over the management and formation of the seminary in 1865 to become a seminary-college and center of education for lay people in Southern Luzon. In 1925, Bishop Francisco Reyes renamed it as Seminario del Santissimo Rosario and abolished the College and retained the Conciliar Seminary. It was partly damaged when it was bombed by the Japanese during the second war.

In 1964, it was renamed Holy Rosary Minor Seminary under the new management of Diocese of Clegy. In 1970, a powerful typhoon extensively damaged the Seminary and was rebuilt under the leadership of Archbishop Teopisto Alberto.

It was declared as a National Historical Landmark on June 11, 1978 by then National Historical Institute as a tribute to its having produced martyrs, patriots and heroes like Jose Maria Panganiban, Tomas Arejola and nine of the fifteen Bikol Martyrs namely, Gabriel Prieto, P. Severino Diaz, Leon Hernandez, Mariano Ordinanza, Mariano Arana, Camilo Jacob, Ramon Abella, Domingo Abella and Tomas Prieto. Among its prominent alumni are Bishop Jorgr Barlin, the first Filipino bishop, Cardinal Jose Tomas Sanchez and 21 other bishops in the country.

On September 5, 1988 the late Archbishop Leonardo Legaspi renamed it back to Holy Rosary Minor Seminary and inaugurated the Museo del Seminario Conciliar de Nueva Caceres which houses altars and statues, books and vestments used by bishops and priests.

== Description ==
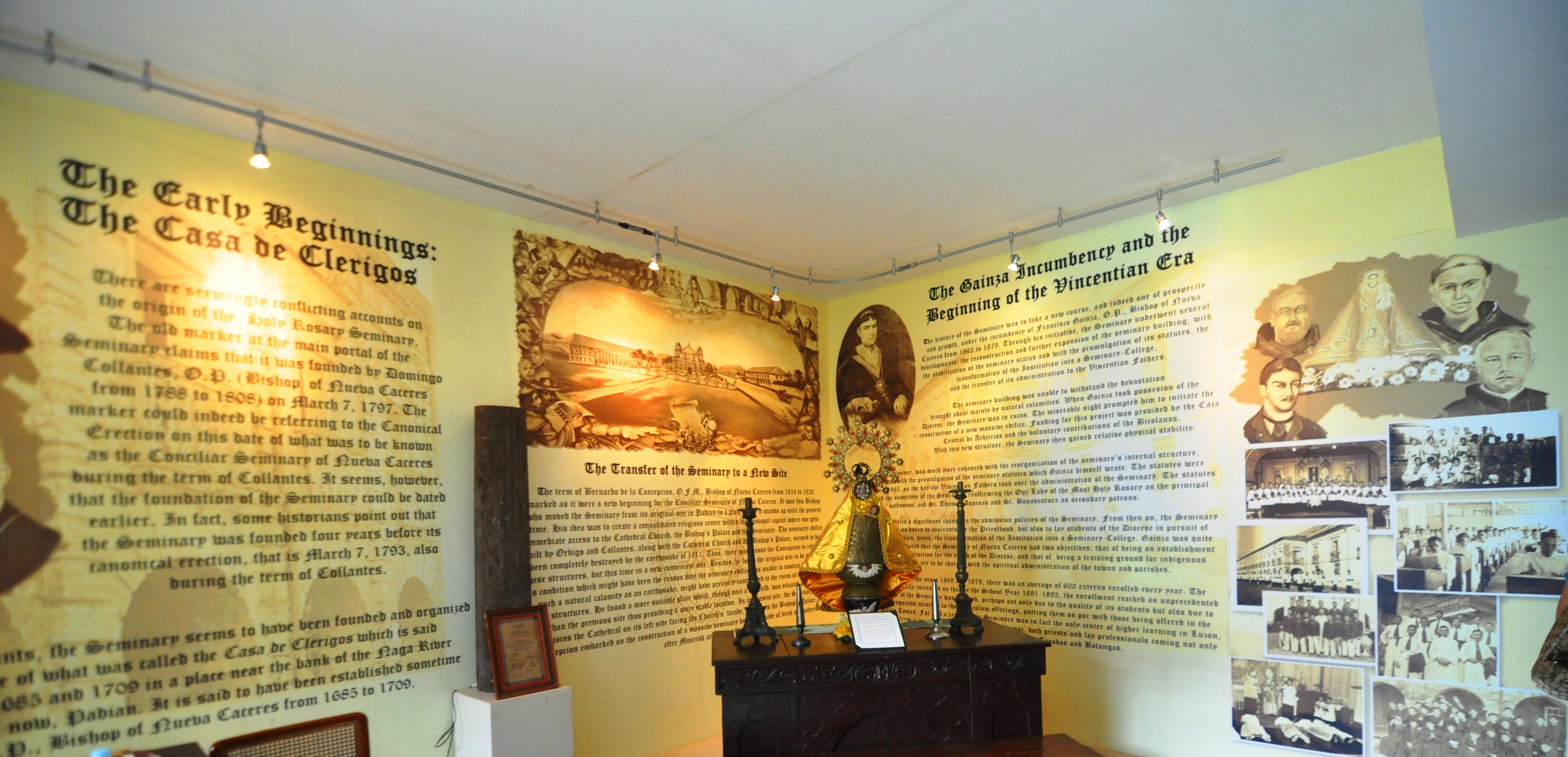
The Ecclesiastical Museum

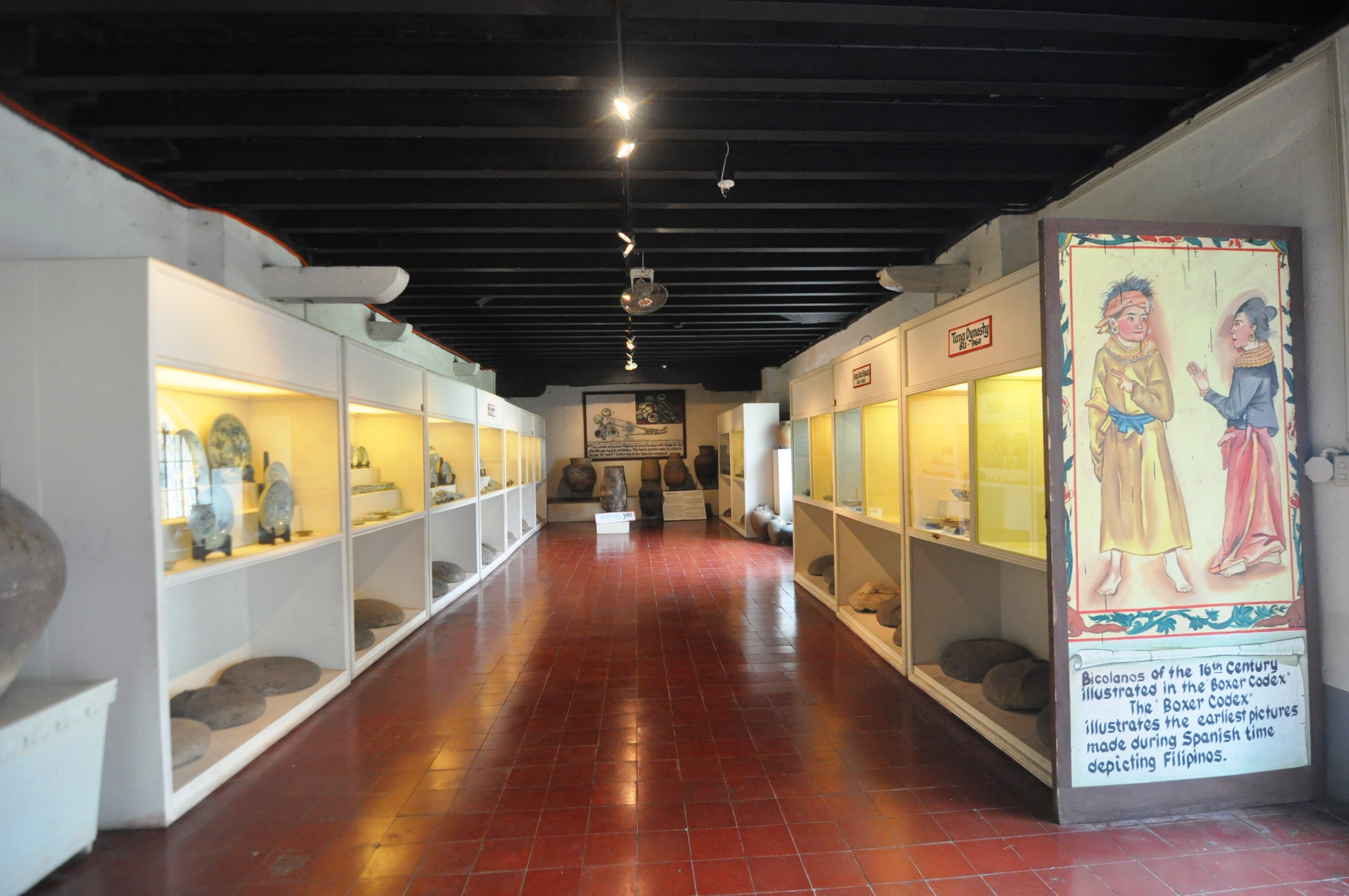
The Archeological Museum

The two-storey brick structure is rectangular in plan with eclectic Italian Renaissance ornamentation. Its composition is symmetrical with a central block and indented right and left wings. Its ground floor facade is a series of brick arches quite similar to Florentine Renaissance architecture. On the roof level is a brick cornice above the frieze composed of triglyphs and regula, elements from classical Greek Architecture. The frieze is supported by a stylized Doric crenelated brick pilaster. The second floor facade has verandahs supported by a projection of brick cornices with ornamental ironwork fern design ledge. The doors are topped by corniced rain-stopper.

On October 17, 2003, the late Archbishop Legaspi opened the Bishop Domingo Collantes Library with a 30,000-book collection and can sit 100 readers in its 280 sq. m. hall.

The seminary offers Junior High School (Grades 7–10) and Senior High School (Grades 11–12) in accordance with the K-12 curriculum. It offers the General Academic Strand for Senior High School which includes Introduction to Philosophy and other courses in Journalism in preparation for the Major Seminary

== Administration ==
Presently the Seminary is under the leadership of the Metropolitan Archbishop of Caceres, Rex Andrew Clement Alarcon, DD. Its current rector is Rev.Fr. Francis A. Tordilla who is also serving as Director of the Caceres Commission on Communications.

== Gallery ==
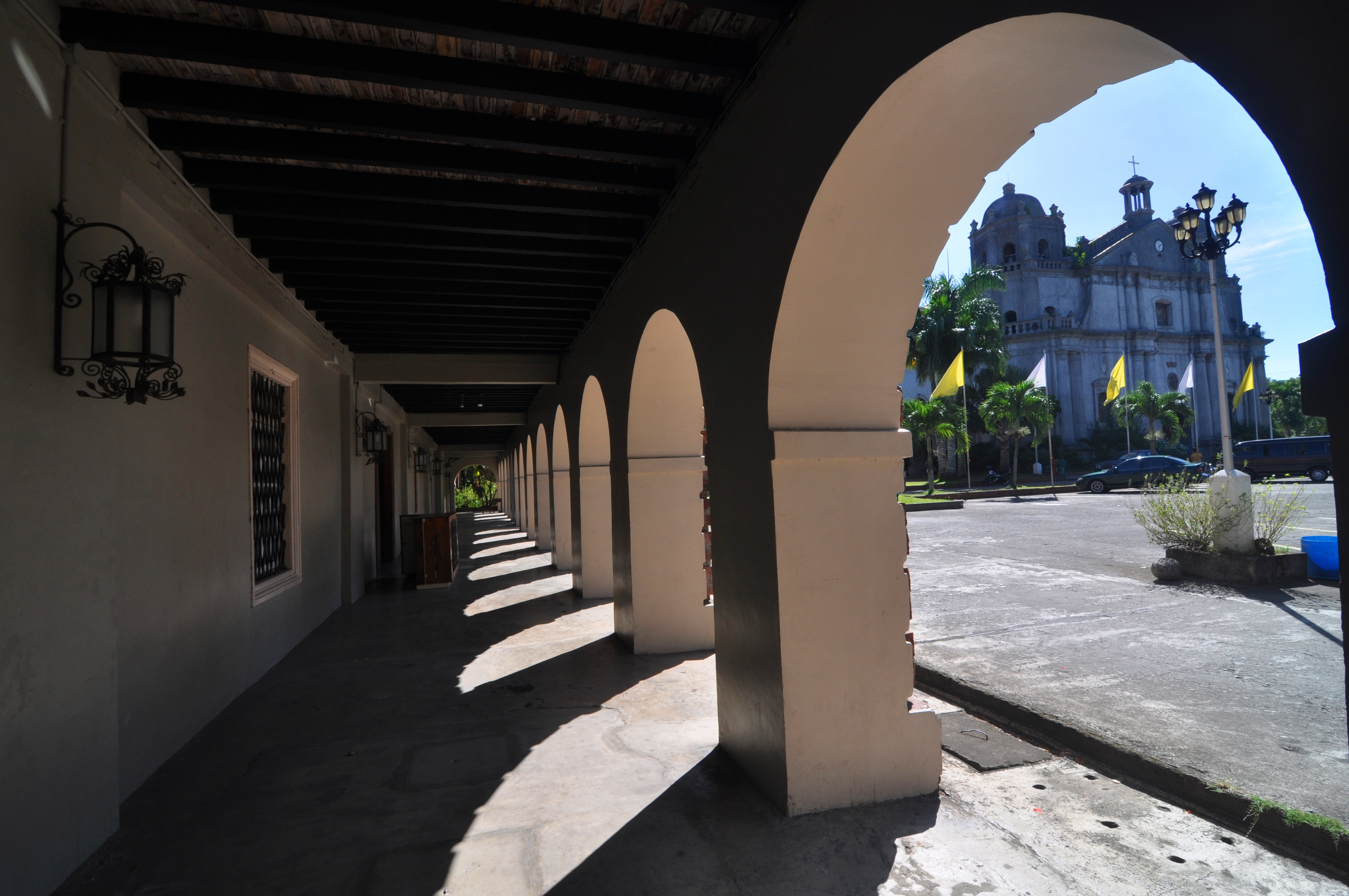
Arcaded Facade

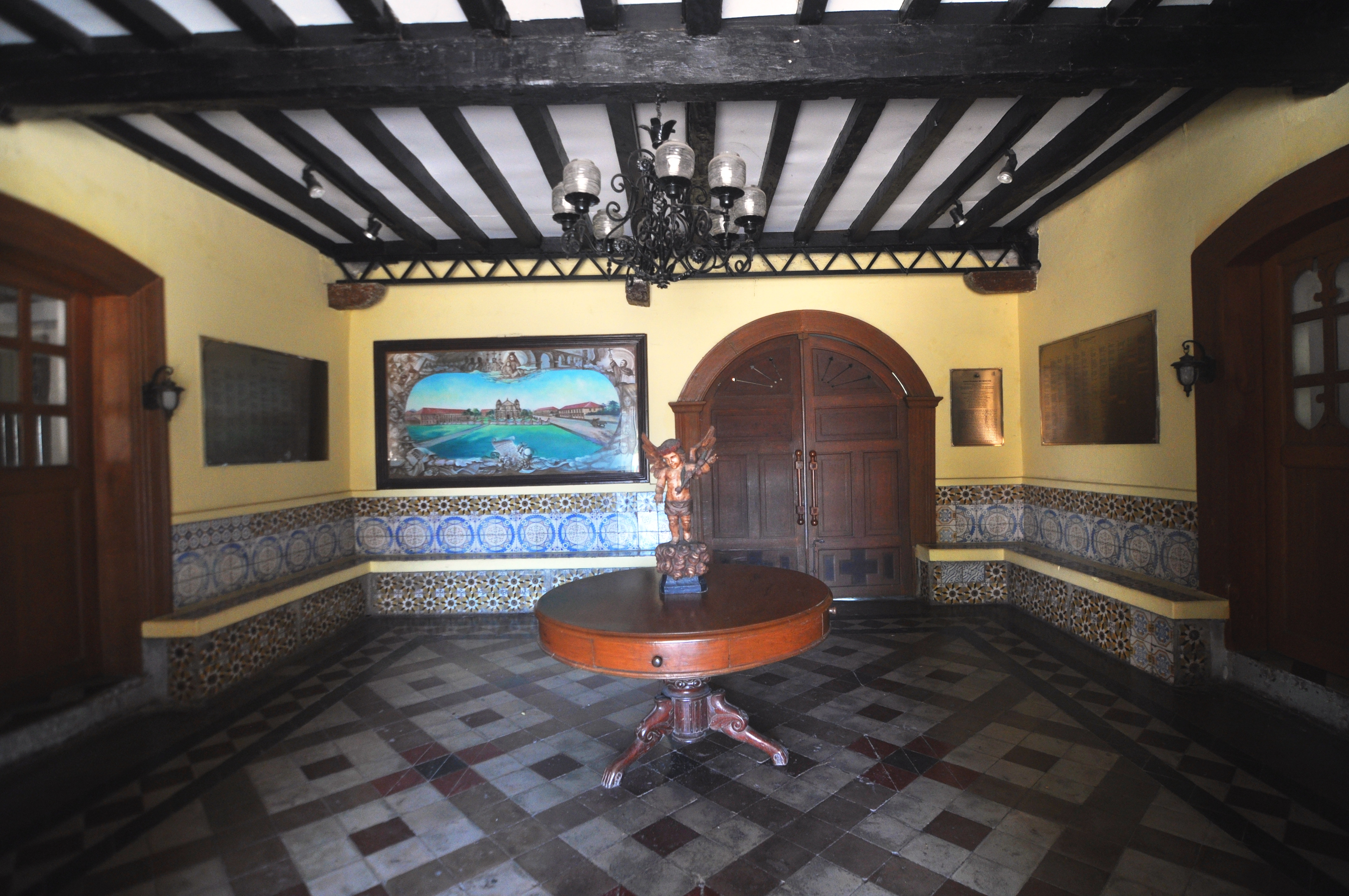
Seminary Lobby

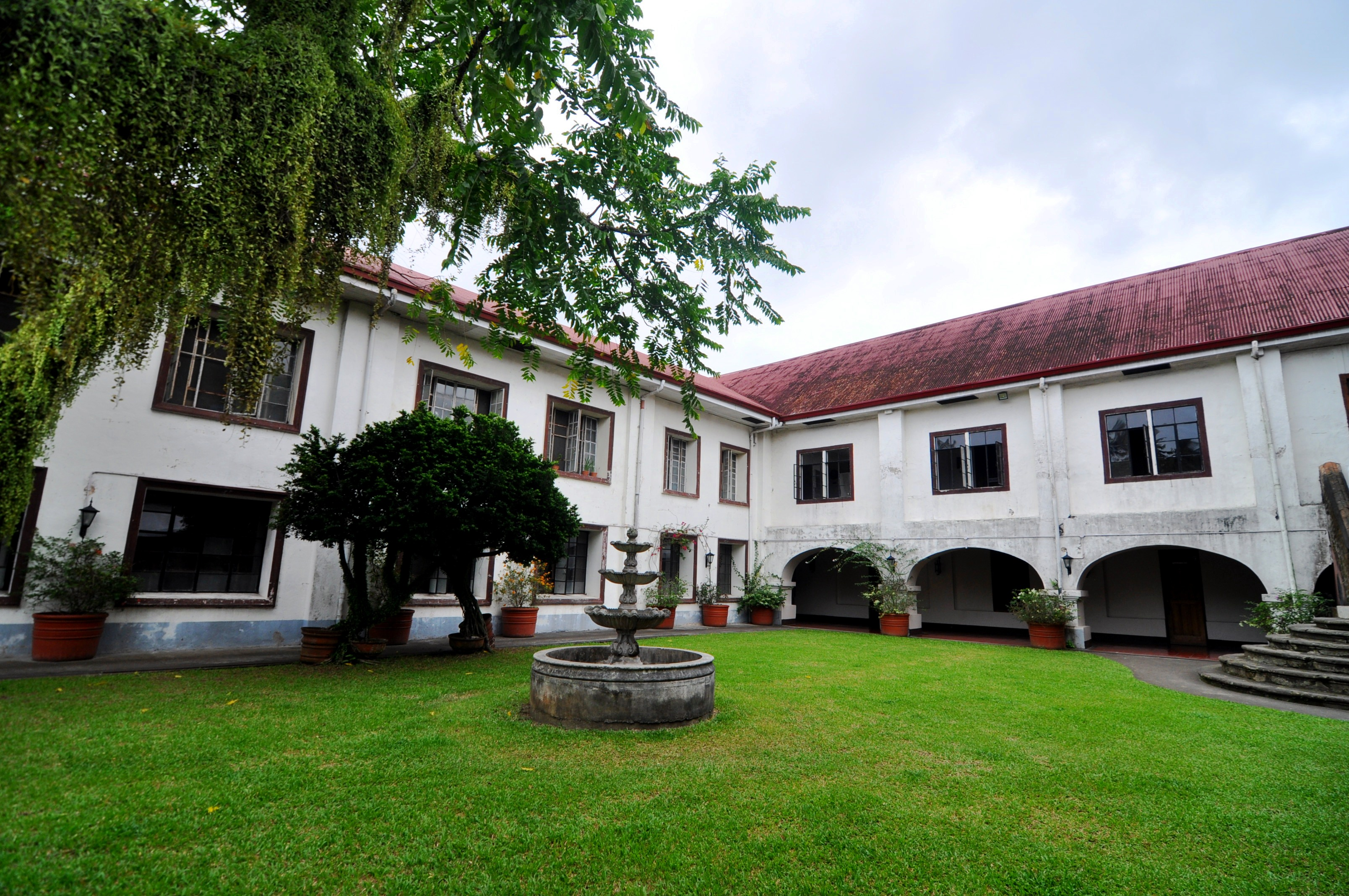
Inside Courtyard

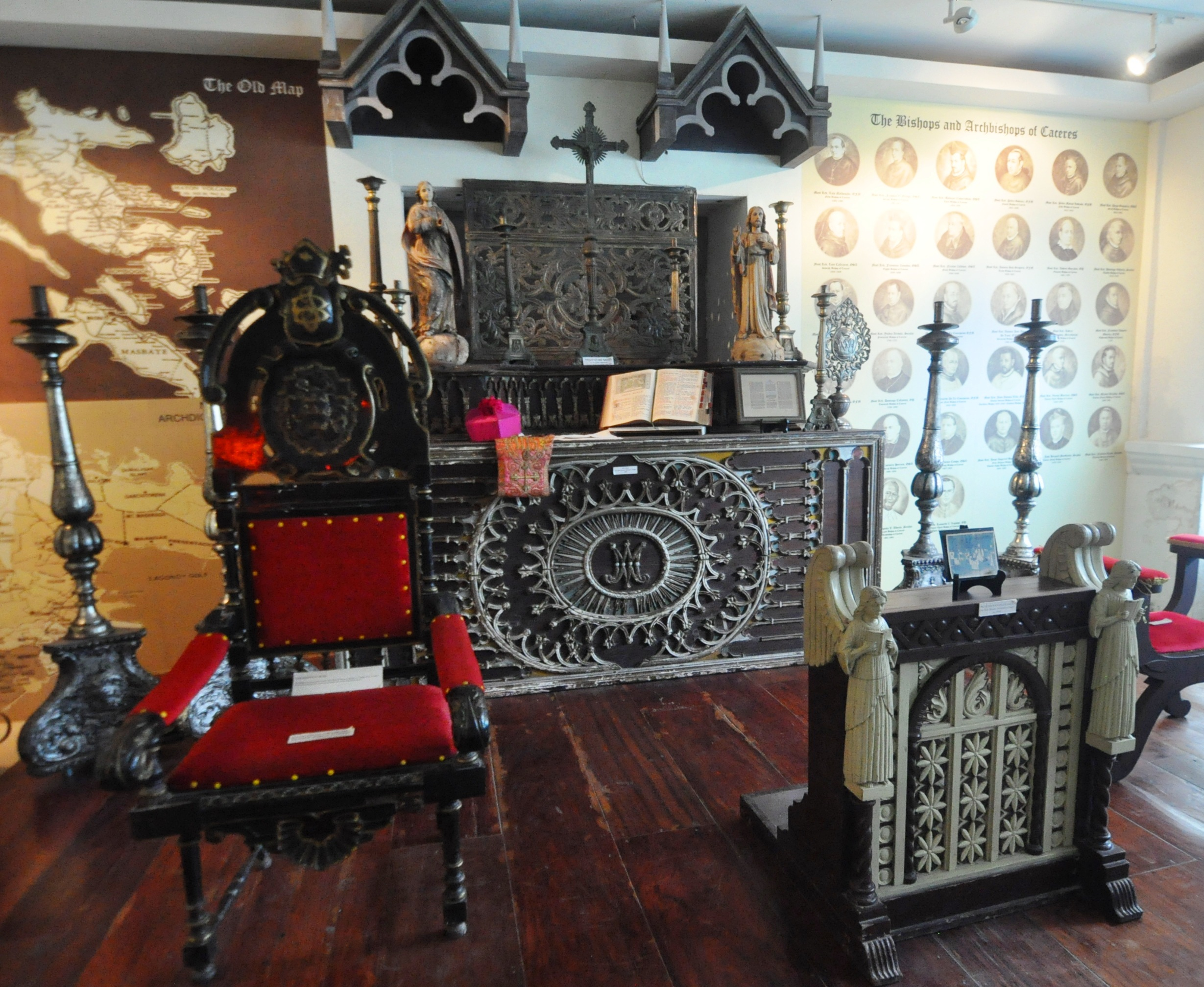
Ecclesiastical Museum Altars and Seats

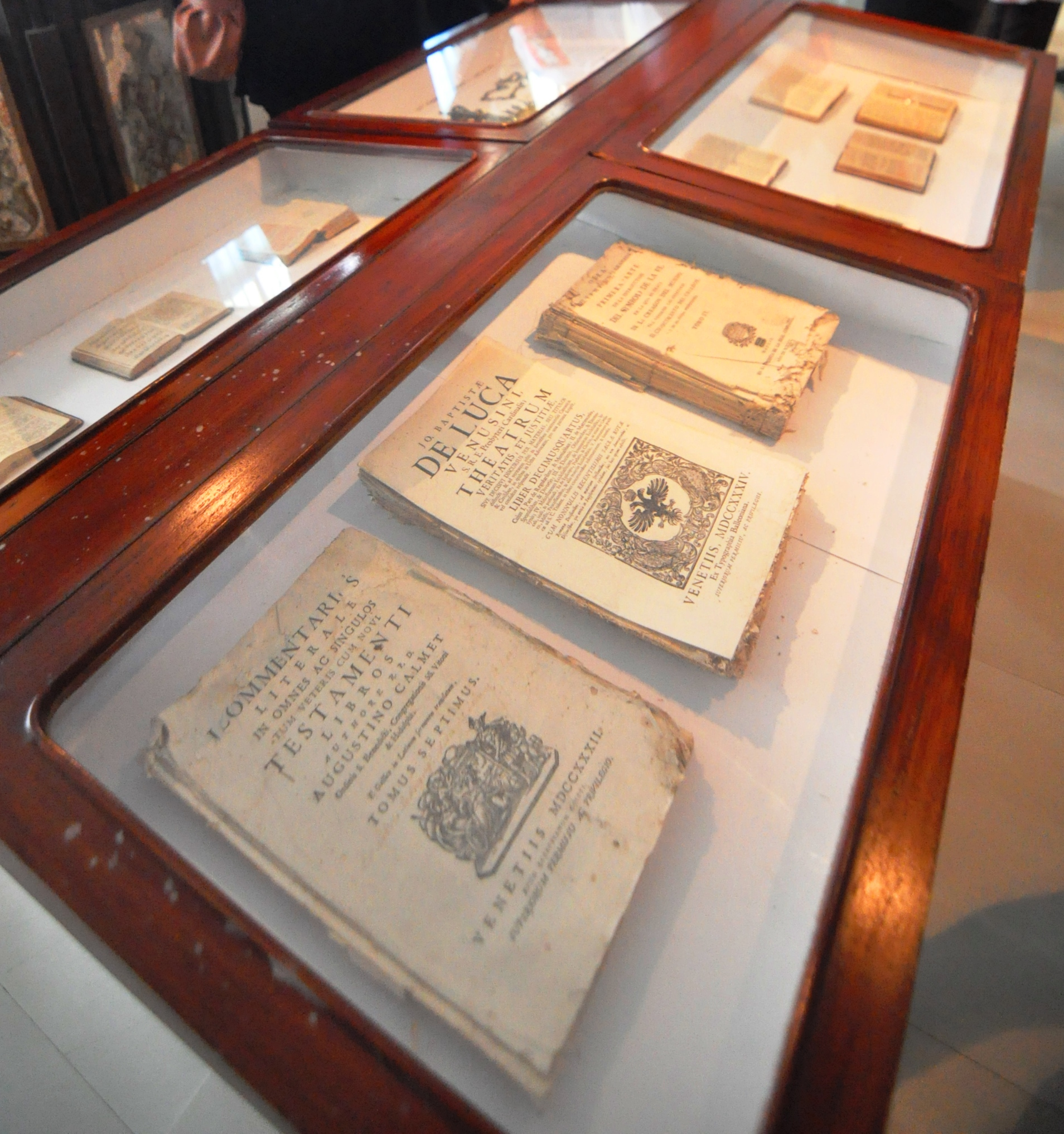
Ecclesiastical Museum Old Books

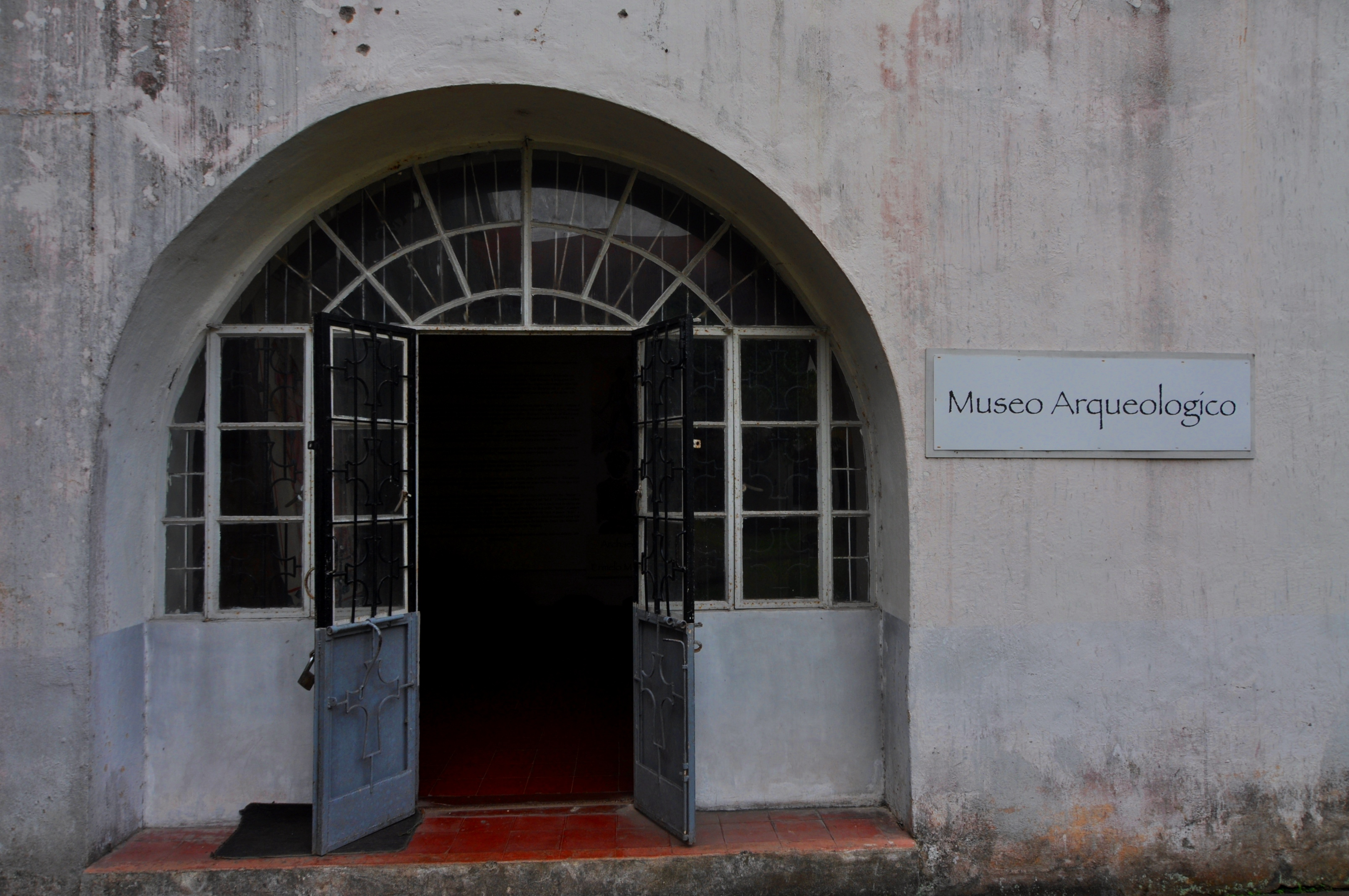
Archeological Museum Entrance

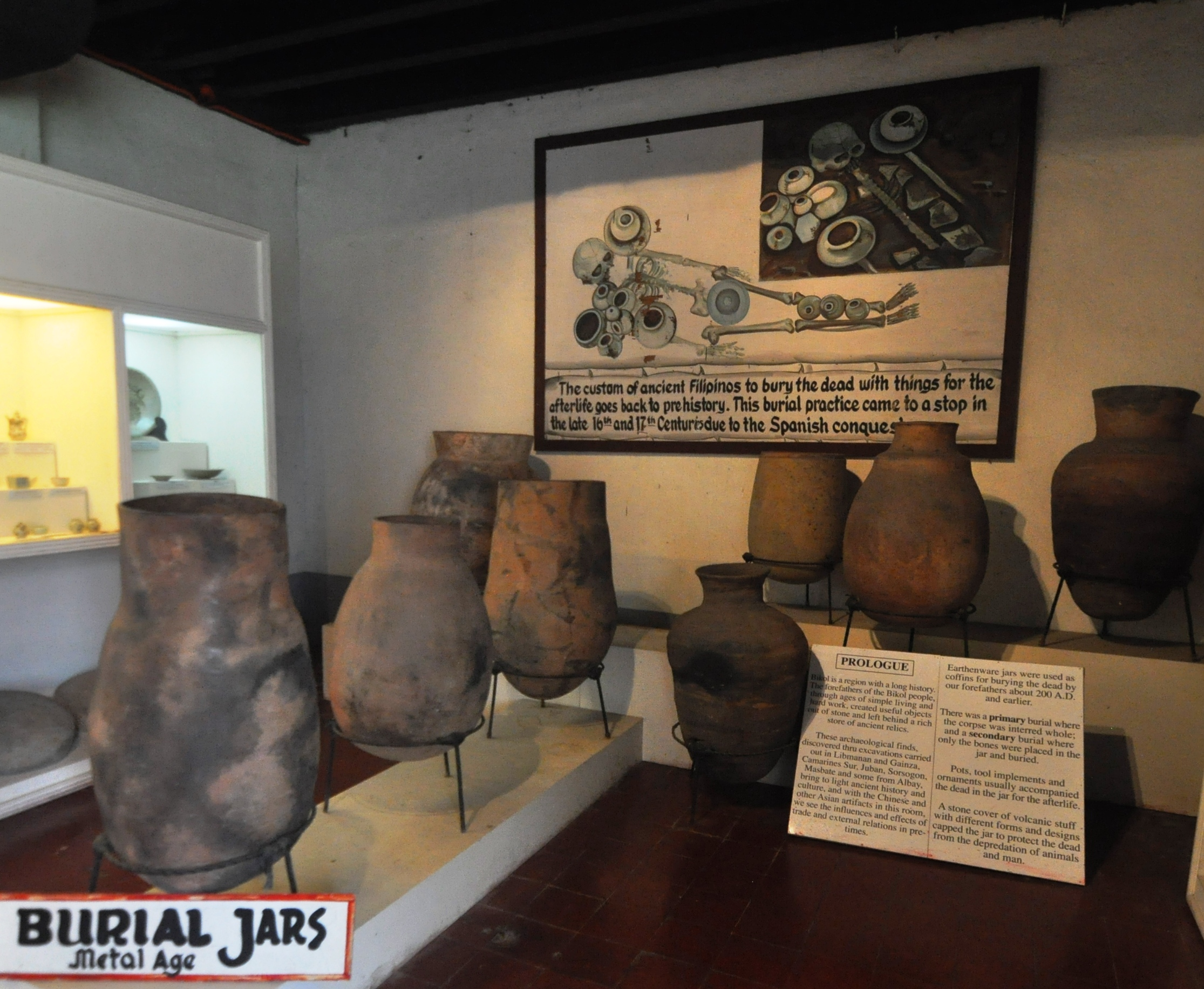
Burial Jars

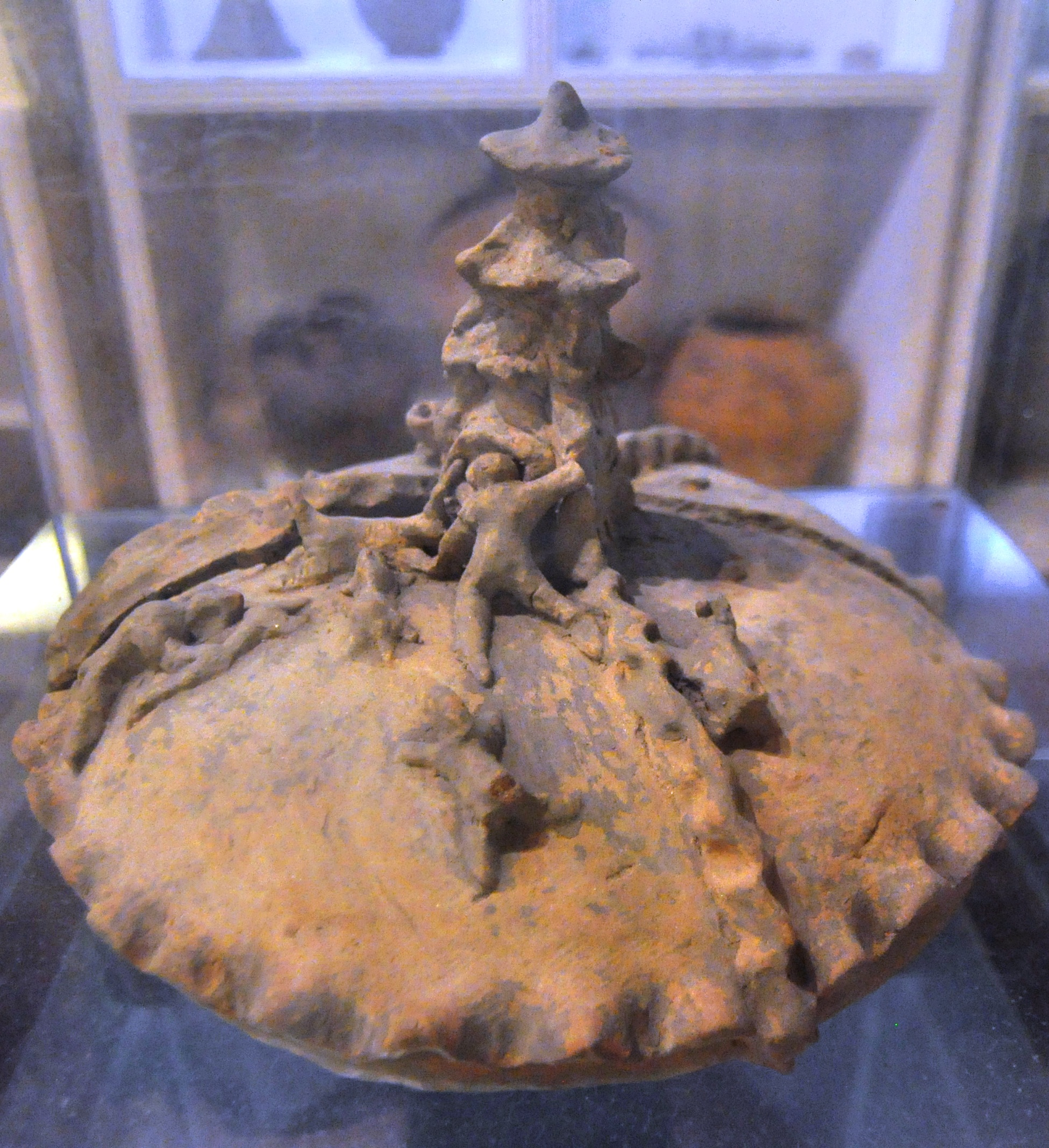
Burial Jar Cover

== Alumni ==
The Holy Rosary Seminary, a Roman Catholic seminary run by the Archdiocese of Caceres, has produced 22 bishops, including the first Filipino bishop, Jorge Barlin, and the first Filipino cardinal to work in the Roman Curia, Cardinal Jose Tomas Sanchez. It has richly contributed as well to the national heritage through Jose Ma. Panganiban and Tomas Arejola and 7 of the 15 Bikol Martyrs.

== National Historical Landmark ==
On January 29, 1988, the National Historical Institute declared the Holy Rosary Seminary as a National Historical Landmark.
