= Panganiban, Catanduanes =

Municipality in Catanduanes, Philippines

Panganiban Payo
- Municipality
- Municipality of Panganiban
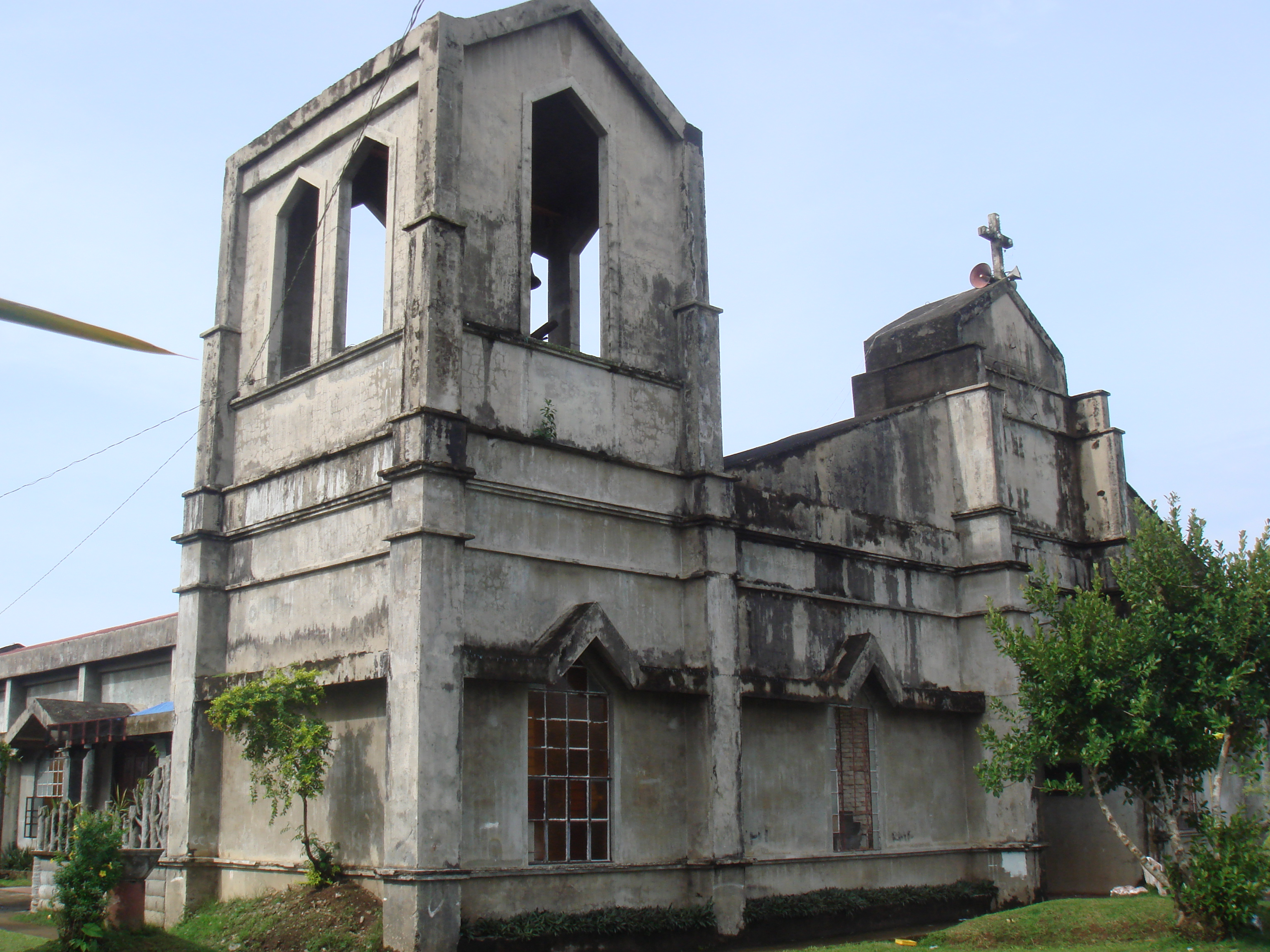
- St. James the Greater Church

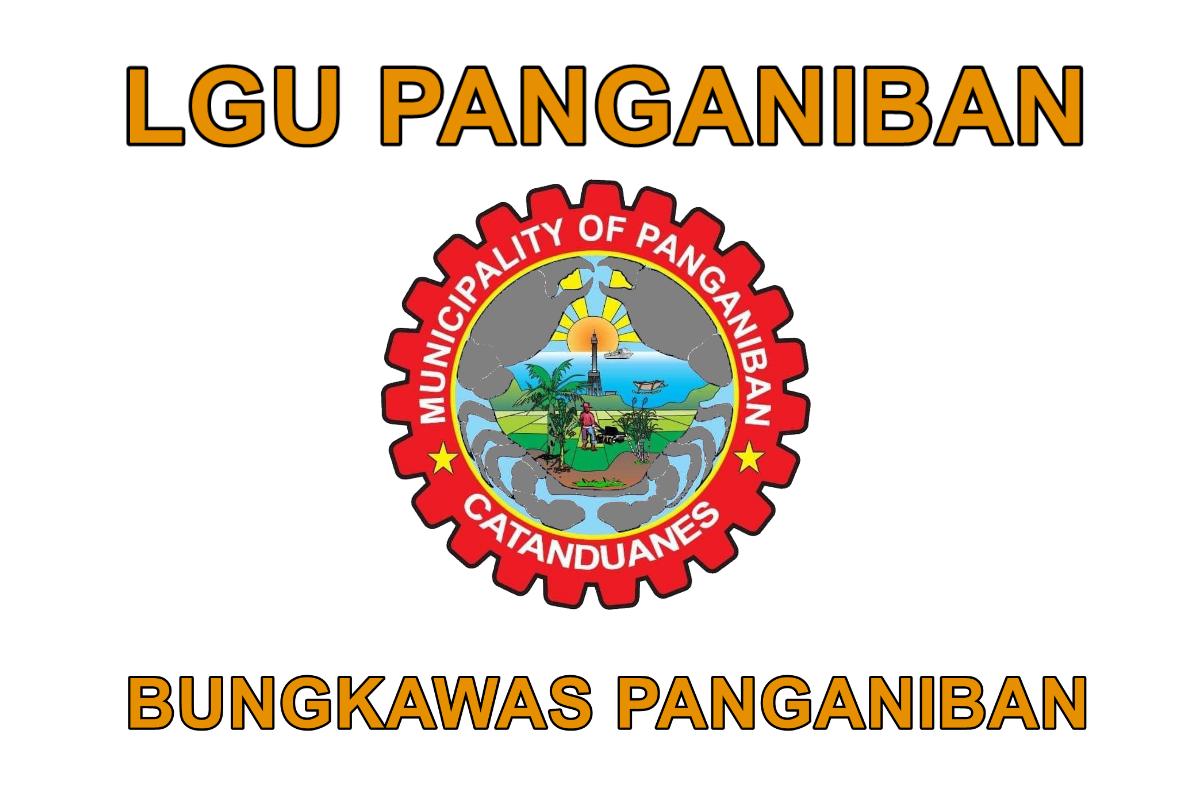
- Flag
- Nickname: Crab Capital of Catanduanes
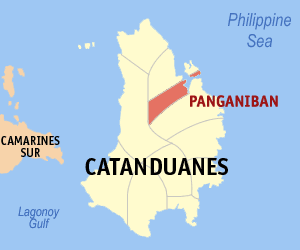
- Map of Catanduanes with Panganiban highlighted
- Interactive map of Panganiban
- Location within the Philippines
- Coordinates: 13°54′N 124°18′E
- Country: Philippines
- Region: Bicol Region
- Province: Catanduanes
- District: Lone district
- Founded: January 1, 1921
- Named for: Jose Maria Panganiban
- Barangays: 23 (see Barangays)

Government
  - Type: Sangguniang Bayan
  - Mayor: Cesar J. Robles
  - Vice Mayor: Arvin V. Atencia
  - Representative: Eulogio R. Rodriguez
  - Municipal Council: Members: Ian T. Fernandez; Engr. Silvestre V. Villamor Jr; Ma. Kristel A. Angeles; Luz V. Velasco; Sanny T. Vallespin; Edgardo V. Morales; Primo A. Velasco Jr.; Engr. Felix U. Vargas Jr.
  - Electorate: 8,306 voters (2025)

Area
  - Total: 79.96 km^{2} (30.87 sq mi)
- Elevation: 63 m (207 ft)
- Highest elevation: 366 m (1,201 ft)
- Lowest elevation: −2 m (−6.6 ft)

Population (2024 census)
  - Total: 8,947
  - Density: 111.9/km^{2} (289.8/sq mi)
  - Households: 2,183

Economy
  - Income class: 4th municipal income class
  - Poverty incidence: 25.09% (2023)
  - Revenue: ₱ 99.85 million (2024)
  - Assets: ₱ 304.4 million (2024)
  - Expenditure: ₱ 38.85 million (2024)
  - Liabilities: ₱ 72.47 million (2024)

Service provider
  - Electricity: First Catanduanes Electric Cooperative (FICELCO)
- Time zone: UTC+8 (PST)
- ZIP code: 4806
- PSGC: 0502007000
- IDD : area code: +63 (0)52
- Native languages: Bicol
- Website: www.panganiban-catanduanes.gov.ph

Panganiban, officially the Municipality of Panganiban, is a municipality in the province of Catanduanes, Philippines. According to the 2024 census, it has a population of 8,947 people.

== Etymology ==
Although the original name was Payo, this town has changed name from Panganiban to Payo and back again. During the last term of the late assemblyman Francisco Perfecto, Panganiban became Payo again on April 20, 1957, under Republic Act No. 1654. Congressman Jose M. Alberto (through Republic Act 2122 enacted without executive approval April 15, 1959) changed the name to Panganiban again by which it is officially known at present.

According to legend, the town's early settlers elected a tribal chief whom they called “Payo” which could have been their vernacular term for headman.

== History ==
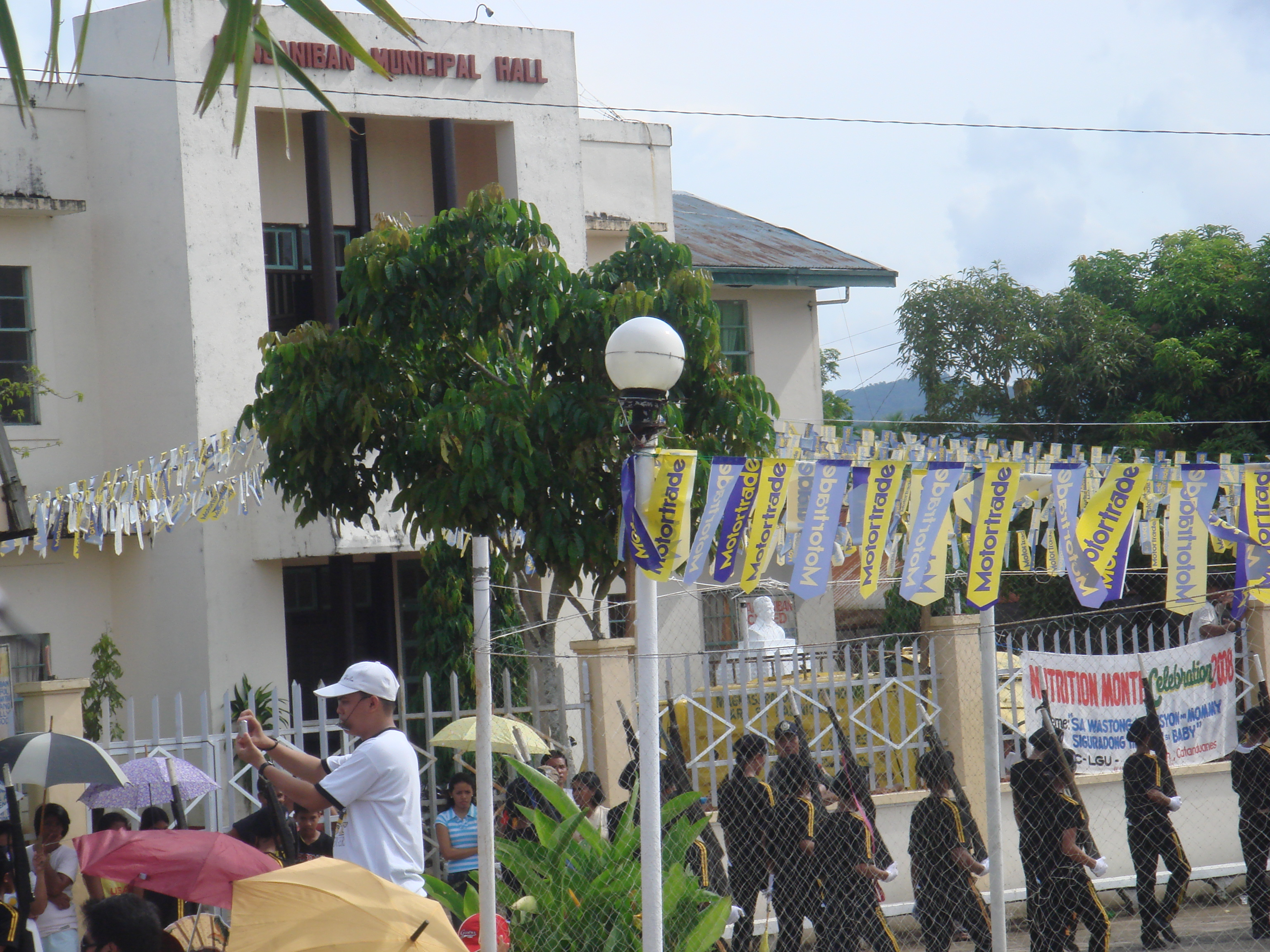
Town fiesta civic parade in front of the municipal hall

The year 1818 census shows that Payo (Now Panganiban) had 644 native families and 17 Spanish-Filipino families.

On January 1, 1921, Governor General Francis B. Harrison signed into law Executive Order No. 55 officially segregating the municipality from Viga; thenceforth was called Panganiban, in honor of José María Panganiban, whose relative – Jose Blanca Panganiban – stood as sponsor during the inauguration.

== Geography ==
It is situated on the northern part of Catanduanes, with its eastern part facing the Pacific Ocean. It is bounded on the north by the municipality of Bagamanoc, on the south by the municipality of Viga, and on the west by the municipality of Caramoran which is covered by a dense forest.

The town proper is 55 kilometres (34 mi) from Virac, the capital town and commercial center of the province. Panganiban is 5 kilometres (3.1 mi) from Viga and 5 kilometres (3.1 mi) from Bagamanoc.

Bagamanoc was created from barrios of Quigaray, Hinipagan, Sukhan in the island of Panay; Lati, in the island of Lati; Bacac, Hinipaan, Bugao, Minaili and Bagamanoc of the municipality of Panganiban by virtue of Republic Act No. 491 which was approved on June 12, 1950.

The municipal councils of Bagamanoc and Panganiban agreed on the boundary of the two towns on June 12, 1952. The agreement was approved by the provincial council of Catanduanes on July 12, 1952. The Congress formalized the agreement by passing Republic Act No. 1038 which was approved on June 12, 1954. The boundary was stated thus:

The boundary of Panay Island between the municipalities of Bagamanoc and Panganiban is a straight line from Amontol Point to Tubigmanoc. The territory west of the line belongs to the former municipality and the territory east of the line belongs to the latter. The boundary in Panganiban Bay is a straight line from Amontol Point to the mouth of the Pangcayanan Creek. The territory north-west of the line belongs to the former and the territory south-west of the line belongs to the latter. The boundary in the mainland of said municipalities extends from the mouth of Pangcayanan Creek following the natural course of said creek up to the concrete culvert and from that point of straight line to sitio Inacban: Provided, That sitio Inacban belongs to the municipality of Panganiban.

=== Barangays ===
Panganiban is politically subdivided into 23 barangays. Each barangay consists of puroks and some have sitios.

- Alinawan
- Babaguan
- Bagong Bayan
- Burabod
- Cabuyoan
- Cagdarao
- Mabini
- Maculiw
- Panay
- Taopon (Pangcayanan)
- Salvacion (Poblacion)
- San Antonio
- San Joaquin (Poblacion)
- San Jose (Poblacion)
- San Juan (Poblacion)
- San Miguel
- San Nicolas (Poblacion)
- San Pedro (Poblacion)
- San Vicente (Poblacion)
- Santa Ana (Poblacion)
- Santa Maria (Poblacion)
- Santo Santiago (Poblacion)
- Tibo

=== Climate ===
Climate data for Panganiban
Month	Jan	Feb	Mar	Apr	May	Jun	Jul	Aug	Sep	Oct	Nov	Dec	Year
Mean daily maximum °C (°F)	29.1 (84.4)	29.5 (85.1)	30.3 (86.5)	31.3 (88.3)	32.2 (90.0)	32.5 (90.5)	32.2 (90.0)	32.3 (90.1)	32.1 (89.8)	31.3 (88.3)	30.6 (87.1)	29.5 (85.1)	31.1 (87.9)
Daily mean °C (°F)	25.5 (77.9)	25.7 (78.3)	26.2 (79.2)	27.1 (80.8)	28.0 (82.4)	28.3 (82.9)	28.1 (82.6)	28.2 (82.8)	27.8 (82.0)	27.2 (81.0)	26.9 (80.4)	26.1 (79.0)	27.1 (80.8)
Mean daily minimum °C (°F)	22.0 (71.6)	21.9 (71.4)	22.2 (72.0)	23.0 (73.4)	23.9 (75.0)	24.1 (75.4)	24.0 (75.2)	24.1 (75.4)	23.6 (74.5)	23.2 (73.8)	23.2 (73.8)	22.8 (73.0)	23.2 (73.7)
Average rainfall mm (inches)	391 (15.4)	306 (12.0)	292 (11.5)	148 (5.8)	199 (7.8)	221 (8.7)	297 (11.7)	207 (8.1)	316 (12.4)	636 (25.0)	869 (34.2)	697 (27.4)	4,579 (180)
Source: Climate-Data.org

Panganiban has a tropical rainforest climate (Af) with heavy to very heavy rainfall year-round and with extremely heavy rainfall in November and December.

== Demographics ==
Population census of Panganiban
Year	Pop.	±% p.a.
1903	2,521	—
1939	10,618	+4.07%
1948	12,385	+1.73%
1960	8,311	−3.27%
1970	7,589	−0.90%
1975	7,789	+0.52%
1980	7,409	−0.99%
1990	8,344	+1.20%
1995	8,480	+0.30%
2000	8,877	+0.99%
2007	9,290	+0.63%
2010	9,738	+1.73%
2015	9,287	−0.90%
2020	9,713	+0.95%
2024	8,947	−1.95%
Source: Philippine Statistics Authority

In the 2024 census, the population of Panganiban was 8,947 people, with a density of 110 inhabitants per square kilometre or 280 inhabitants per square mile.

== Economy ==
Poverty incidence of Panganiban (%)

Source: Philippine Statistics Authority

== Education ==
The Panganiban Schools District Office governs all educational institutions within the municipality. It oversees the management and operations of all private and public, from primary to secondary schools.

=== Primary and elementary schools ===
- Alinawan Elementary School
- Babaguan Elementary School
- Bayhan Primary School
- Burabod Community School
- Cabuyoan Elementary School
- Cagdarao Elementary School
- Mabini Elementary School
- Maculiw Community School
- Panay Community School
- Panganiban Central Elementary School
- San Miguel Elementary School
- Tibo Community School

=== Secondary schools ===
- Panganiban National High School
- Panganiban National High School (Caic Compound)
