= Mayor of Naga, Camarines Sur =

Local chief executive of Naga, Camarines Sur

- Filipino: Punong Lungsod ng Naga, Camarines Sur; Central Bikol: Alkalde kan Naga, Camarines Sur
- Seal of the City of Naga, Camarines Sur

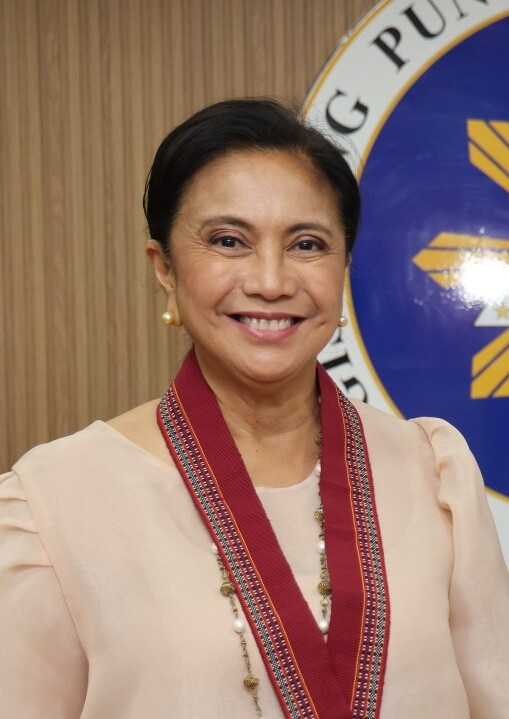
- Incumbent; Leni Robredo since June 30, 2025
- Style: The Honorable (formal)
- Seat: Naga City Hall
- Appointer: Elected via popular vote
- Term length: 3 years

The Mayor of Naga, Camarines Sur (Filipino: Punong Lungsod ng Naga, Camarines Sur; Central Bikol: Alkalde kan Naga, Camarines Sur) is the head of the executive branch of the city government of Naga, Camarines Sur.

The current mayor is Leni Robredo, who has served since June 30, 2025.

== History ==
In May 1945, the Naga Municipal Council was reestablished by the Philippine Civil Affairs Unit of the 8th United States Army, which installed Rosalio Imperial as municipal mayor, serving as the presiding officer of the council. Naga later received cityhood in 1948, but Philippine presidents continued appointing its mayors until 1959, when the first local elections were held. Within the span of one year from 1953 to 1954, Naga had four mayors. Leon S. A. Aureus, who had been appointed in December 1948, served until August 1953, when he resigned to run for Camarines Sur's 1st congressional district in the House of Representatives. He was succeeded by Anastacio Prila, who was appointed in September 1953. Following Ramon Magsaysay's election as president, Antonio Sibulo was appointed mayor in January 1954. Sibulo was later succeeded by Monico Imperial after his appointment was not confirmed by the Commission on Appointments in June 1954.

In 1959, Nacionalista candidate Victorino Ojeda was elected the first city mayor, defeating Liberal candidate Ramon Felipe Jr. Felipe later won in 1963, defeating Ojeda's vice mayor, Mariano Villafuerte Jr., but resigned two years into his term to run for Camarines Sur's 1st district in the House of Representatives. Incumbent vice mayor Vicente Sibulo succeeded to the mayoralty and was re-elected in 1967 and 1971, before martial law was declared in September 1972.

Sibulo continued serving as mayor while expressing support for President Ferdinand Marcos's administration, despite belonging to the opposition, and endorsed candidates of the newly formed ruling coalition Kilusang Bagong Lipunan (KBL) for the 1978 elections to the Interim Batasang Pambansa. However, he was removed from office in December 1979, with Luis Villafuerte, an emerging power broker who would later become provincial governor and representative, alleged to have requested Marcos to remove Sibulo. Carlos del Castillo, the then vice mayor, acted as mayor until the 1980 local elections, the first since the imposition of martial law, where he won a full term as a KBL candidate. Del Castillo, along with Villafuerte, was among the local officials who bolted to the opposition party UNIDO, and he was reappointed mayor after Marcos's ouster in 1986 by President Corazon Aquino following the People Power Revolution.

Republic Act No. 6636 reset the date of the first local elections under the 1987 Constitution from November 9, 1987, to January 18, 1988. Jesse Robredo, a nephew of Villafuerte, successfully ran for mayor, the youngest in the country, alongside Lourdes Asence under the Lakas ng Bansa ticket, despite the city council being dominated by the local alliance Cory Coalition. Robredo had switched from Laban ng Demokratikong Pilipino to Lakas–NUCD by the 1992 elections, where he won a second term, and won a third term in 1995. He backed Aksyon Demokratiko candidate Sulpicio Roco Jr., the brother of Senator Raul Roco, in 1998, where the latter won. Jesse Robredo later sought a fourth term in 2001 under the Liberal Party banner and won two more terms, serving until 2010, after which he was appointed secretary of the interior and local government by President Benigno Aquino III. He later died in 2012 in a plane crash.

In 2010, the Liberal Party slate was led by lawyer John Bongat and Gabriel Bordado for mayor and vice mayor, respectively, and swept all seats in the city council. Bongat was re-elected in 2013, with city councilor Nelson Legacion winning as vice mayor. They both served another term from 2016 to 2019.

Legacion ran for mayor and won in 2019, and was re-elected in 2022, serving until 2025, when he ran for Camarines Sur's 3rd congressional district in Congress. He gave way by declining to seek re-election as mayor in favor of former vice president Leni Robredo, the wife of the late Jesse Robredo, whose candidacy for mayor had been publicly discussed as early as mid-2024. She went on to win alongside Bordado as vice mayor, making her the city's first female chief executive.

== List of mayors ==
No.	Portrait	Name (lifespan)	Term	Party	Election	Vice mayor	Era
1		Rosalio Imperial (1902–1978)	May 1945 – June 1946	Independent	— (Note: Appointed by President Sergio Osmeña.)	Blas David (until 1946)	Commonwealth
1		Rosalio Imperial (1902–1978)	May 1945 – June 1946	Independent	—	Domingo Escalante (from 1946)	Commonwealth
2		Blas David	June 1946 – September 1947	Independent	— (Note: Appointed by President Manuel Roxas.)	Raymundo Martinez	Commonwealth
2		Blas David	June 1946 – September 1947	Independent	—	Raymundo Martinez	Third Republic
3		Felix Espiritu	September 1947 – December 15, 1947	Independent	—	Raymundo Martinez	Third Republic
4		Feliciano Reyes	January 1, 1948 – December 1948	Independent	—	Carlos Ruivivar	Third Republic
5		Leon Aureus (1908–1969)	December 15, 1948 – August 1953 (Note: Leon Aureus resigned to run for Camarines Sur's 1st congressional district in the House of Representatives, but lost to Emilio Tible Sr.)	Liberal	— (Note: Appointed by President Elpidio Quirino.)	Carlos Ruivivar (until 1951)	Third Republic
5		Leon Aureus (1908–1969)	December 15, 1948 – August 1953	Liberal	—	—	Third Republic
6		Anastacio Prila	September 1953 – January 1954 (Note: Not reappointed.)	Independent	—	—	Third Republic
7		Antonio Sibulo (1920–1976)	January 1954 – May 1954 (Note: Antonio Sibulo's term ended after not being confirmed by the Senate Committee on Appointments.)	Independent	— (Note: Appointed by President Ramon Magsaysay.)	—	Third Republic
8		Monico Imperial	June 1954 – August 31, 1959	Independent	—	—	Third Republic
9		Rosalio Imperial (1902–1978)	September 1, 1959 – December 1959	Independent	— (Note: Appointed by President Carlos P. Garcia.)	—	Third Republic
10		Victorino Ojeda	January 1960 – December 1963	Nacionalista	1959	Mariano Villafuerte Jr. (until 1963)	Third Republic
10		Victorino Ojeda	January 1960 – December 1963	Nacionalista	1959	Reynaldo Borja (acting, from 1963)	Third Republic
11		Ramon Felipe Jr. (1920–2017)	January 1964 – September 1965	Liberal	1963	Vicente Sibulo	Third Republic
12		Vicente Sibulo (1925–2011)	September 1965 – December 1979	Liberal	—	Manuel Barte (acting, until 1967)	Third Republic
12		Vicente Sibulo (1925–2011)	September 1965 – December 1979	Liberal	—	Siegfredo Obias (1967)	Third Republic
12		Vicente Sibulo (1925–2011)	September 1965 – December 1979	Liberal	1967	Virginia Perez (1968–1976)	Third Republic
12		Vicente Sibulo (1925–2011)	September 1965 – December 1979	Liberal	1971	Virginia Perez (1968–1976)	Third Republic
12		Vicente Sibulo (1925–2011)	September 1965 – December 1979	Liberal	—	Virginia Perez (1968–1976)	Martial law
12		Vicente Sibulo (1925–2011)	September 1965 – December 1979	Liberal	—	Carlos G. del Castillo (from 1976)	Martial law
Acting		Carlos G. del Castillo	December 1979 – February 1980	KBL (until 1984)	—	—	Martial law
13		Carlos G. del Castillo	March 1980 – February 1, 1988	KBL (until 1984)	1980	Siegfredo Obias (until 1986)	Martial law
13		Carlos G. del Castillo	March 1980 – February 1, 1988	KBL (until 1984)	1980	Siegfredo Obias (until 1986)	Fourth Republic
13		Carlos G. del Castillo	March 1980 – February 1, 1988	UNIDO (from 1984)	1980	Siegfredo Obias (until 1986)	Fourth Republic
13		Carlos G. del Castillo	March 1980 – February 1, 1988	UNIDO (from 1984)	— (Note: Appointed by President Corazon Aquino.)	Siegfredo Obias (until 1986)	Provisional; Government
13		Carlos G. del Castillo	March 1980 – February 1, 1988	UNIDO (from 1984)	—	Efren G. Santos (1987)	Fifth Republic
13		Carlos G. del Castillo	March 1980 – February 1, 1988	UNIDO (from 1984)	—	Romeo Tablizo (OIC; from 1987)	Fifth Republic
14		Jesse Robredo (1958–2012)	February 2, 1988 – June 30, 1998	LDP (until 1991)	1988	Lourdes Asence	Fifth Republic
14		Jesse Robredo (1958–2012)	February 2, 1988 – June 30, 1998	Lakas (from 1991)	1988	Lourdes Asence	Fifth Republic
14		Jesse Robredo (1958–2012)	February 2, 1988 – June 30, 1998	Lakas (from 1991)	1992	Lourdes Asence	Fifth Republic
14		Jesse Robredo (1958–2012)	February 2, 1988 – June 30, 1998	Lakas (from 1991)	1995	Lourdes Asence	Fifth Republic
15		Sulpicio Roco Jr. (born 1965)	June 30, 1998 – June 30, 2001	Aksyon	1998	Esteban Abonal Jr.	Fifth Republic
16		Jesse Robredo (1958–2012)	June 30, 2001 – June 30, 2010	Liberal	2001	Esteban Abonal Jr.	Fifth Republic
16		Jesse Robredo (1958–2012)	June 30, 2001 – June 30, 2010	Liberal	2004	Gabriel Bordado	Fifth Republic
16		Jesse Robredo (1958–2012)	June 30, 2001 – June 30, 2010	Liberal	2007	Gabriel Bordado	Fifth Republic
17		John Bongat (born 1964)	June 30, 2010 – June 30, 2019	Liberal	2010	Gabriel Bordado	Fifth Republic
17		John Bongat (born 1964)	June 30, 2010 – June 30, 2019	Liberal	2013	Nelson Legacion	Fifth Republic
17		John Bongat (born 1964)	June 30, 2010 – June 30, 2019	Liberal	2016	Nelson Legacion	Fifth Republic
18		Nelson Legacion (born 1968)	June 30, 2019 – June 30, 2025	Liberal (until 2024)	2019	Cecilia Veluz-de Asis	Fifth Republic
18		Nelson Legacion (born 1968)	June 30, 2019 – June 30, 2025	Liberal (until 2024)	2022	Cecilia Veluz-de Asis	Fifth Republic
18		Nelson Legacion (born 1968)	June 30, 2019 – June 30, 2025	Lakas (from 2024)	2022	Cecilia Veluz-de Asis	Fifth Republic
19		Leni Robredo (born 1965)	June 30, 2025 – present	Liberal	2025	Gabriel Bordado	Fifth Republic

== Vice Mayor of Naga, Camarines Sur ==
Vice Mayor of Naga, Camarines Sur
- Pangalawang Punong Lungsod ng Naga, Camarines Sur
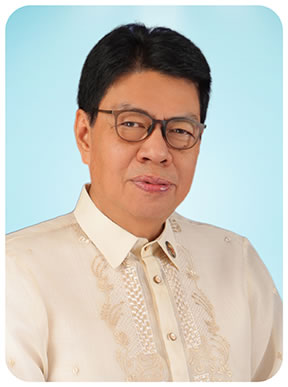
- Incumbent; Gabriel Bordado since June 30, 2025
- Style: The Honorable (formal)
- Appointer: Elected via popular vote
- Term length: 3 years

The vice mayor of Naga, Camarines Sur is the second-highest official in the city government of Naga, Camarines Sur. Elected separately from the mayor by popular vote, the vice mayor serves as the presiding officer of the Naga City Council.

Upon the death, resignation, or removal from office of the incumbent mayor, the vice mayor serves the remainder of the unexpired term until the next general election. If the office of the vice mayor becomes vacant through succession or for any of the foregoing reasons, the highest-ranking member of the city council assumes the office of vice mayor.

The incumbent vice mayor of Naga, Camarines Sur is Gabriel Bordado, who has served since June 30, 2025.

=== List of vice mayors ===
No.	Portrait	Name (lifespan)	Term	Party	Election	Mayor	Era
1		Blas David	May 1945 – March 1946	Independent	—	Rosalio Imperial	Commonwealth
2		Domingo Escalante	March 1946 – June 1946	Independent	—	Rosalio Imperial	Commonwealth
3		Raymundo Martinez	June 1946 – September 1947	Independent	—	Blas David	Commonwealth
3		Raymundo Martinez	June 1946 – September 1947	Independent	—	Blas David	Third Republic
3		Raymundo Martinez	June 1946 – September 1947	Independent	—	Felix Espiritu	Third Republic
4		Carlos Ruivivar	January 1, 1948 – December 1951	Independent	—	Feliciano Reyes	Third Republic
4		Carlos Ruivivar	January 1, 1948 – December 1951	Independent	—	Leon Aureus	Third Republic
Vacant (January 1952 – January 1960)						Leon Aureus	Third Republic
Vacant (January 1952 – January 1960)						Anastacio Prila	Third Republic
Vacant (January 1952 – January 1960)						Antonio Sibulo	Third Republic
Vacant (January 1952 – January 1960)						Monico Imperial	Third Republic
Vacant (January 1952 – January 1960)						Rosalio Imperial	Third Republic
5		Mariano Villafuerte Jr. (1929–2016)	January 1960 – September 1963	Nacionalista	1959	Victorino Ojeda	Third Republic
Acting		Reynaldo Borja	September 1963 – November 4, 1963	Nacionalista	— (Note: Assumed office in an acting capacity; Malacañang Palace later declared on November 4, 1963 to have no authority.)	Victorino Ojeda	Third Republic
6		Vicente Sibulo (1925–2011)	January 1964 – September 1965	Liberal	1963	Ramon Felipe Jr.	Third Republic
Acting		Manuel Barte	October 11, 1965 – September 1967	Liberal	— (Note: Designated by Malacañang Palace as acting vice mayor.)	Vicente Sibulo	Third Republic
7		Siegfredo Obias	September 1967 – January 1968	Nacionalista	— (Note: Assumed as vice mayor on September 1967 by virtue of the Decentralization Act of 1967.)	Vicente Sibulo	Third Republic
9		Virginia Perez	January 1968 – January 1976	Liberal	1967	Vicente Sibulo	Third Republic
9		Virginia Perez	January 1968 – January 1976	Liberal	1971	Vicente Sibulo	Third Republic
9		Virginia Perez	January 1968 – January 1976	Liberal	—	Vicente Sibulo	Martial law
10		Carlos G. del Castillo	February 1976 – February 1980	KBL	—	Vicente Sibulo	Martial law
11		Siegfredo Obias	March 1980 – December 26, 1986 (Note: Died in office.)	KBL	1980	Carlos G. del Castillo	Martial law
11		Siegfredo Obias	March 1980 – December 26, 1986	KBL	1980	Carlos G. del Castillo	Fourth Republic
11		Siegfredo Obias	March 1980 – December 26, 1986	KBL	—	Carlos G. del Castillo	Provisional; Government
12		Efren G. Santos	March 15, 1987 – December 1, 1987	Independent	—	Carlos G. del Castillo	Fifth Republic
OIC		Romeo Tablizo	December 4, 1987 – February 1, 1988	Independent	—	Carlos G. del Castillo	Fifth Republic
13		Lourdes Asence (1936–2017)	February 2, 1988 – June 30, 1998	LDP (until 1991)	1988	Jesse Robredo	Fifth Republic
13		Lourdes Asence (1936–2017)	February 2, 1988 – June 30, 1998	Lakas (from 1991)	1988	Jesse Robredo	Fifth Republic
13		Lourdes Asence (1936–2017)	February 2, 1988 – June 30, 1998	Lakas (from 1991)	1992	Jesse Robredo	Fifth Republic
13		Lourdes Asence (1936–2017)	February 2, 1988 – June 30, 1998	Lakas (from 1991)	1995	Jesse Robredo	Fifth Republic
14		Esteban Abonal Jr. (d. 2021)	June 30, 1998 – June 30, 2004	Aksyon (until 2001)	1998	Sulpicio Roco Jr.	Fifth Republic
14		Esteban Abonal Jr. (d. 2021)	June 30, 1998 – June 30, 2004	Liberal (from 2001)	2001	Jesse Robredo	Fifth Republic
15		Gabriel Bordado (born 1955)	June 30, 2004 – June 30, 2013	Liberal	2004	Jesse Robredo	Fifth Republic
15		Gabriel Bordado (born 1955)	June 30, 2004 – June 30, 2013	Liberal	2007	Jesse Robredo	Fifth Republic
15		Gabriel Bordado (born 1955)	June 30, 2004 – June 30, 2013	Liberal	2010	John Bongat	Fifth Republic
16		Nelson Legacion (born 1968)	June 30, 2013 – June 30, 2019	Liberal	2013	John Bongat	Fifth Republic
16		Nelson Legacion (born 1968)	June 30, 2013 – June 30, 2019	Liberal	2016	John Bongat	Fifth Republic
17		Cecilia Veluz-de Asis	June 30, 2019 – June 30, 2025	Liberal	2019	Nelson Legacion	Fifth Republic
17		Cecilia Veluz-de Asis	June 30, 2019 – June 30, 2025	Liberal	2022	Nelson Legacion	Fifth Republic
18		Gabriel Bordado (born 1955)	June 30, 2025 – present	Liberal	2025	Leni Robredo	Fifth Republic
