= Naga City Council (Camarines Sur) =

City council of Naga, Camarines Sur

Naga City Council Sangguniang Panlungsod ng Naga
- 15th Sangguniang Panlungsod ng Naga

Type
- Type: Unicameral
- Term limits: 3 terms (9 years)

History
- Founded: 1976
- Preceded by: Naga Municipal Board

Leadership
- Presiding Officer: Gabriel Bordado, Liberal since June 30, 2025

Structure
- Seats: 12 councilors (including 2 ex officio members); 1 ex officio presiding officer
- Political groups: Liberal (9); Independent (2); Nonpartisan (2)
- Authority: Naga City Charter; Local Government Code of the Philippines

Elections
- Voting system: Plurality-at-large voting (12 seats); Indirect elections (2 seats)
- Last election: May 12, 2025
- Next election: May 15, 2028

Meeting place
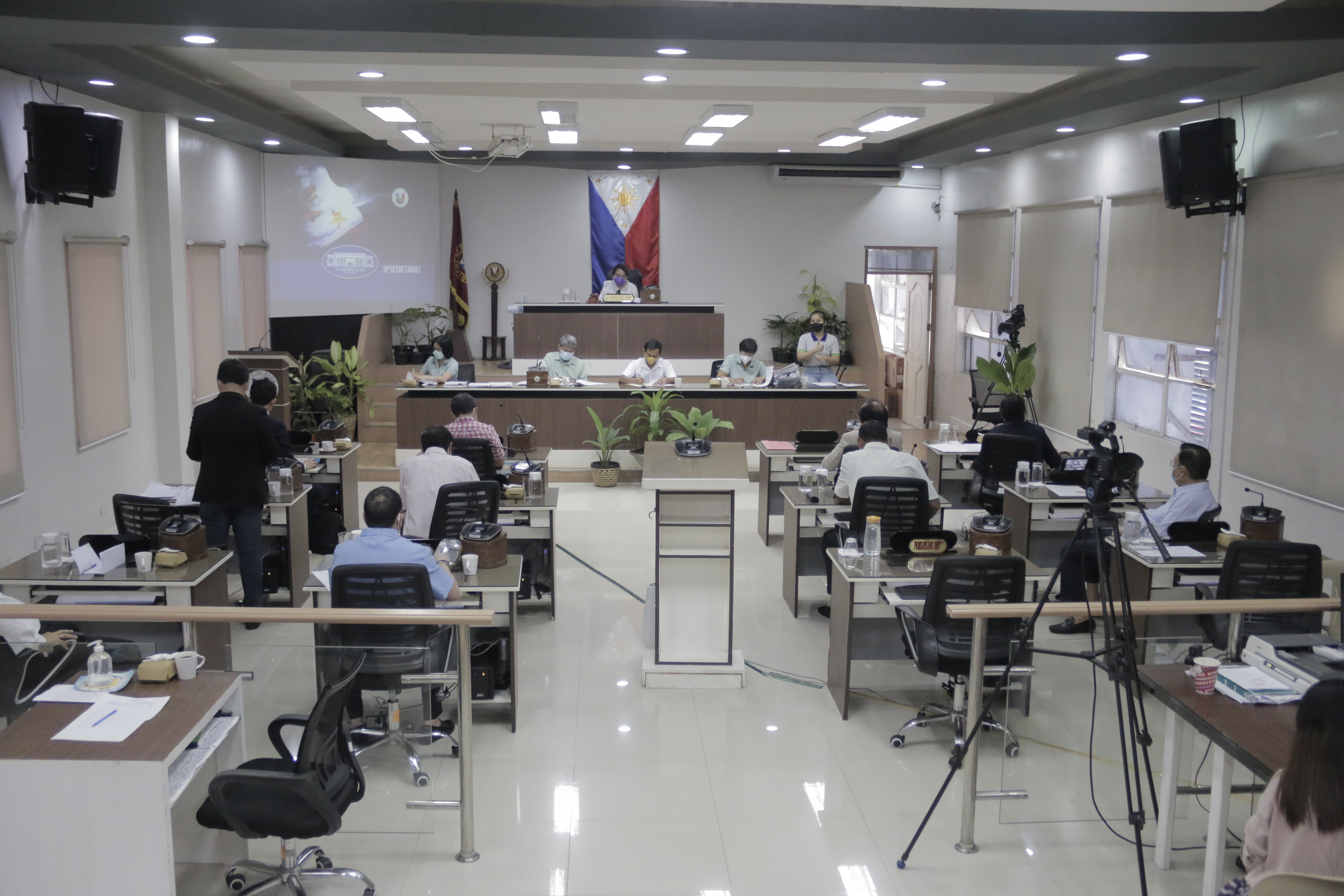
- Main City Hall Building, Naga City Hall Complex, Naga City, Camarines Sur

Website
- naga.gov.ph/the-sangguniang-panlungsod

The Naga City Council (Filipino: Sangguniang Panlungsod ng Naga) is the legislature of Naga, Camarines Sur. It is composed of 12 councilors, with 10 councilors elected from Naga as an at-large district and two councilors elected from the ranks of barangay (neighborhood) chairmen and the Sangguniang Kabataan (SK; youth councils). The presiding officer of the council is the vice mayor, who is elected citywide.

The council is responsible for creating laws and ordinances under the city's jurisdiction. The mayor can veto proposed bills, but the council can override it with a two-thirds supermajority.

== History ==
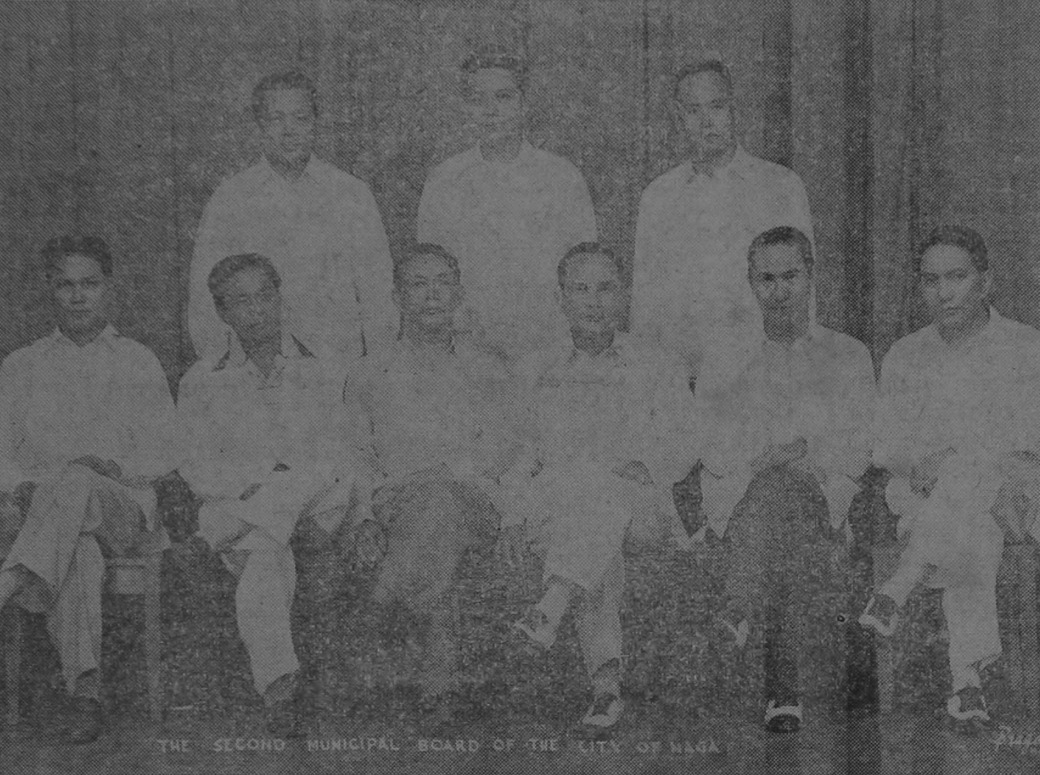
The Second Municipal Board of the City of Naga, Camarines Sur

In 1948, the first municipal board of Naga City was established following its conversion into a city, with the appointive mayor, Leon S. A. Aureus, serving as its presiding officer. The council was composed of five appointive councilors, as well as the city treasurer and city engineer serving as ex officio members. The mayor was granted an annual salary of ₱4,000, while the five councilors received a per diem of ₱10 for each day of attendance at the council's sessions.

By 1960, following the first citywide elections in 1959, all seven councilors were elected, with no ex officio members, and the vice mayor serving as presiding officer. In 1976, the first Sangguniang Panlungsod (City Council) was inaugurated, with 16 councilors serving. The enactment of Republic Act No. 6636 in 1987 provided for other cities to have 10 councilors elected at large, with this composition taking effect in the 3rd Sangguniang Panlungsod following the 1988 elections. It was the first local election under the 1987 Constitution, in which eight of the 10 council seats were won by the opposition coalition Cory Coalition, led by mayoral candidate Ramon Roco. The remaining two council seats, as well as the positions of mayor and vice mayor, were won by members of the Lakas ng Bansa ticket led by Jesse Robredo and Lourdes Asence.

In 2025, the Liberal Party continued to dominate local politics by securing the mayorship for Leni Robredo, the vice mayorship for Gabriel Bordado, and a majority of the city council, winning eight seats.

== Seat ==
The Naga City Council meets at the Main City Hall Building of the Naga City Hall Complex in Barangay Concepcion Pequeña.

== Current composition ==
Position	Member	Party	Elected
Presiding Officer	Gabriel Bordado	Liberal	2025
City Councilors	Elmer Baldemoro	Liberal	2025
City Councilors	Jessie Albeus	Liberal	2025
City Councilors	Ghiel Rosales	Liberal	2025
City Councilors	Vito Borja II	Liberal	2025
City Councilors	Gilda Gayle Abonal-Gomez	Liberal	2025
City Councilors	Melvin Ramon Buenafe	Liberal	2025
City Councilors	Wilfredo Jude Diokno	Independent	2025
City Councilors	Francisco Mendoza	Liberal	2025
City Councilors	Allan Reiz Macaraig	Liberal	2025
City Councilors	David Casper Nathan Sergio	Independent	2025
Liga ng mga Barangay President	Ma. Corazon Peñaflor	Nonpartisan	
SK Federation President	Jefson Romeo Felix	Nonpartisan	

== Historical composition ==
=== 14th Sangguniang Panlungsod (2022–2025) ===
July 1, 2022 – June 30, 2025
Position	Member	Party	Elected
Presiding Officer	Cecilia Veluz-De Asis	Liberal	2022
City Councilors	Jessie Albeus	Liberal	2022
City Councilors	Joselito del Rosario	Independent	2022
City Councilors	Ghiel Rosales	Liberal	2022
City Councilors	Melvin Ramon Buenafe	Liberal	2022
City Councilors	Gilda Gayle Abonal-Gomez	Liberal	2022
City Councilors	Vidal Castillo	Liberal	2022
City Councilors	Jose Rañola	Independent	2022
City Councilors	Jose Perez	Liberal	2022
City Councilors	Salvador del Castillo	Liberal	2022
City Councilors	Antonio Beltran	Liberal	2022
ABC President	Ma. Corazon Peñaflor	Nonpartisan	2022
SK Federation President	Jefson Romeo Felix	Nonpartisan	2022

=== 13th Sangguniang Panlungsod (2019–2022) ===
July 1, 2019 – June 30, 2022
Position	Member	Party	Elected
Presiding Officer	Cecilia Veluz-De Asis	Liberal	2019
City Councilors	Ghiel Rosales	Liberal	2019
City Councilors	Joselito del Rosario	Liberal	2019
City Councilors	Gregorio Abonal	Liberal	2019
City Councilors	Mila Raquid-Arroyo	Liberal	2019
City Councilors	Elmer Baldemoro	Liberal	2019
City Councilors	Vidal Castillo	Liberal	2019
City Councilors	Salvador del Castillo	Liberal	2019
City Councilors	Jose Rañola	Liberal	2019
City Councilors	Jose Perez	Liberal	2019
City Councilors	Jessie Albeus	Independent	2019
ABC President	Antonio Beltran	Nonpartisan	2019
SK Federation President	Mary Kyle Francine Tripulca	Nonpartisan	2019

=== 12th Sangguniang Panlungsod (2016–2019) ===
July 1, 2016 – June 30, 2019
Position	Member	Party	Elected
Presiding Officer	Nelson Legacion	Liberal	2016
City Councilors	Cecilia Veluz-De Asis	Liberal	2016
City Councilors	Gregorio Abonal	Liberal	2016
City Councilors	Jose Rañola	Liberal	2016
City Councilors	Elmer Baldemoro	Liberal	2016
City Councilors	Mila Raquid-Arroyo	Liberal	2016
City Councilors	Julian Lavadia Jr.	Liberal	2016
City Councilors	Joselito del Rosario	Liberal	2016
City Councilors	Vidal Castillo	Liberal	2016
City Councilors	Ray-An Cydrick Rentoy	Liberal	2016
City Councilors	Salvador del Castillo	Liberal	2016
ABC President	Antonio Beltran	Nonpartisan	2016
SK Federation President	Mary Kyle Francine Tripulca	Nonpartisan	2016

=== 11th Sangguniang Panlungsod (2013–2016) ===
July 1, 2013 – June 30, 2016
Position	Member	Party	Elected
Presiding Officer	Nelson Legacion	Liberal	2013
City Councilors	Gabriel Bordado	Liberal	2013
City Councilors	Cecilia Veluz-De Asis	Liberal	2013
City Councilors	David Casper Nathan Sergio	Liberal	2013
City Councilors	Esteban Abonal III	Liberal	2013
City Councilors	Ma. Elizabeth Lavadia	Liberal	2013
City Councilors	Joaquin Perez Jr. (Note: Until June 16, 2015.)	Liberal	2013
City Councilors	Elmer Baldemoro	Liberal	2013
City Councilors	Mila Raquid-Arroyo	Liberal	2013
City Councilors	Jose Tuason	Liberal	2013
City Councilors	Ray-An Cydrick Rentoy	Liberal	2013
ABC President	Jose Importante (Note: Until November 30, 2013.)	Nonpartisan	2013
ABC President	Vidal Castillo (Note: From December 1, 2013.)	Nonpartisan (ABC)	2013
SK Federation President	Mary Kyle Francine Tripulca	Nonpartisan	2013

=== 10th Sangguniang Panlungsod (2010–2013) ===
July 1, 2010 – June 30, 2013
Position	Member	Party	Elected
Presiding Officer	Gabriel Bordado	Liberal	2010
City Councilors	Cecilia Veluz-De Asis	Liberal	2010
City Councilors	Nelson Legacion	Liberal	2010
City Councilors	Esteban Abonal Jr.	Liberal	2010
City Councilors	David Casper Nathan Sergio	Liberal	2010
City Councilors	Ma. Elizabeth Lavadia	Liberal	2010
City Councilors	Ray-An Cydrick Rentoy	Liberal	2010
City Councilors	Jose Tuason	Liberal	2010
City Councilors	Salvador del Castillo	Liberal	2010
City Councilors	Joaquin Perez Jr.	Liberal	2010
City Councilors	Raoul Rosales	Liberal	2010
ABC President	Alex Nero (Note: Until December 4, 2012.)	Nonpartisan	2010
ABC President	Jose Importante (Note: From December 4, 2012.)	Nonpartisan	2010
SK Federation President	Dan Paolo Morales	Nonpartisan	2010

=== 9th Sangguniang Panlungsod (2007–2010) ===
July 1, 2007 – June 30, 2010
Position	Member	Party	Elected
Presiding Officer	Gabriel Bordado	Liberal	2007
City Councilors	John Bongat	Liberal	2007
City Councilors	Esteban Abonal Jr.	Liberal	2007
City Councilors	Bernadette Roco	Aksyon	2007
City Councilors	Lourdes Asence	Liberal	2007
City Councilors	William del Rosario	Liberal	2007
City Councilors	Jose Tuason	Liberal	2007
City Councilors	Salvador del Castillo	Liberal	2007
City Councilors	David Casper Nathan Sergio	Liberal	2007
City Councilors	Nelson Legacion	Liberal	2007
City Councilors	Ma. Elizabeth Lavadia	Liberal	2007
SK Federation President	Ray-An Cydrick Rentoy (Note: From January 2008 to March 16, 2010.)	Nonpartisan	2007
SK Federation President	Michael Vincent Garcia (Note: From July 6, 2010.)	Nonpartisan	2007

=== 8th Sangguniang Panlungsod (2004–2007) ===
July 1, 2004 – June 30, 2007
Position	Member	Party	Elected
Presiding Officer	Gabriel Bordado	Liberal	2004
City Councilors	John Bongat	Liberal	2004
City Councilors	Cecilia Veluz-De Asis	Liberal	2004
City Councilors	Esteban Abonal Jr.	Liberal	2004
City Councilors	Lourdes Asence	Liberal	2004
City Councilors	William del Rosario	Liberal	2004
City Councilors	Julian Lavadia Jr.	Independent	2004
City Councilors	Mila Raquid-Arroyo	Liberal	2004
City Councilors	Salvador del Castillo	Liberal	2004
City Councilors	William Kalaw	Liberal	2004
City Councilors	Jose Grageda	Independent	2004

=== 7th Sangguniang Panlungsod (2001–2004) ===
July 1, 2001 – June 30, 2004
Position	Member	Party	Elected
Presiding Officer	Esteban Abonal Jr.	Aksyon	2001
City Councilors	Jose Rañola	Aksyon	2001
City Councilors	John Bongat	Lakas	2001
City Councilors	Cecilia Veluz-De Asis	Aksyon	2001
City Councilors	Gabriel Bordado	Lakas	2001
City Councilors	Lourdes Asence	Lakas	2001
City Councilors	William Kalaw	Aksyon	2001
City Councilors	William del Rosario	Aksyon	2001
City Councilors	Mila Raquid-Arroyo	Aksyon	2001
City Councilors	Simeon Adan	Aksyon	2001
City Councilors	Jose Grageda	Aksyon	2001
Liga ng mga Barangay President	Julian Lavadia Jr.	Nonpartisan	2001
SK Federation President	Yelanie Regmalos-Bautista (Note: Until July 31, 2002.)	Nonpartisan	2001
SK Federation President	Allen Reodanga (Note: From August 1, 2002.)	Nonpartisan (SK Federation)	2001

=== 6th Sangguniang Panlungsod (1998–2001) ===
July 1, 1998 – June 30, 2001
Position	Member	Party	Elected
Presiding Officer	Esteban Abonal Jr.	Aksyon	1998
City Councilors	Gabriel Bordado	Aksyon	1998
City Councilors	Jose Rañola	Aksyon	1998
City Councilors	Simeon Adan	Aksyon	1998
City Councilors	Fiel Rosales	Aksyon	1998
City Councilors	William Kalaw	Aksyon	1998
City Councilors	Cecilia Veluz-De Asis	Aksyon	1998
City Councilors	Rodolfo Fortuno	Aksyon	1998
City Councilors	Francisco Felizmenio	Aksyon	1998
City Councilors	Mila Raquid-Arroyo	Aksyon	1998
City Councilors	Jose Grageda	Aksyon	1998
Liga ng mga Barangay President	Julian Lavadia Jr.	Nonpartisan	1998
SK Federation President	Yelanie Regmalos-Bautista	Nonpartisan	1998

=== 5th Sangguniang Panlungsod (1995–1998) ===
July 1, 1995 – June 30, 1998
Position	Member	Party	Elected
Presiding Officer	Lourdes Asence (Note: Considered resigned pursuant to the provisions of the Omnibus Election Code effective March 26, 1998.)	Lakas	1995
City Councilors	Fiel Rosales (Note: Effectively served as vice mayor from March 26 to June 30, 1998.)	Lakas	1995
City Councilors	Esteban Abonal Jr.	Lakas	1995
City Councilors	Janet Soler	Lakas	1995
City Councilors	Jose Tuason	Lakas	1995
City Councilors	Jose Rañola	Lakas	1995
City Councilors	James Jacob	Lakas	1995
City Councilors	Simeon Adan	Lakas	1995
City Councilors	Gabriel Bordado	Lakas	1995
City Councilors	Jorge de Guzman	Lakas	1995
City Councilors	Socorro Felix	Lakas	1995
Liga ng mga Barangay President	Julian Lavadia Jr.	Nonpartisan	1995
SK Federation President	Yelanie Regmalos	Nonpartisan	1995

=== 4th Sangguniang Panlungsod (1992–1995) ===
July 1, 1992 – June 30, 1995
Position	Member	Party	Elected
Presiding Officer	Lourdes Asence	Lakas	1992
City Councilors	Rodolfo Fortuno	Lakas	1992
City Councilors	Esteban Abonal Jr.	Lakas	1992
City Councilors	Fiel Rosales	Lakas	1992
City Councilors	James Jacob	Lakas	1992
City Councilors	Agapito Tria II	Lakas	1992
City Councilors	Janet Soler	Lakas	1992
City Councilors	Socorro Felix	Lakas	1992
City Councilors	Jorge de Guzman	Lakas	1992
City Councilors	Emilio M. Aguinaldo	Lakas	1992
City Councilors	Manuel Flores	Lakas	1992
Liga ng mga Barangay President	Julian Lavadia Jr.	Nonpartisan	1992
SK Federation President	Ruel Barrios (Note: From January 6, 1993.)	Nonpartisan	1992

=== 3rd Sangguniang Panlungsod (1988–1992) ===
February 2, 1988 – June 30, 1992
Position	Member	Party (Note: At election.)	Elected
Presiding Officer	Lourdes Asence	LnB	1988
City Councilors	Jose Rañola	Cory Coalition	1988
City Councilors	Roberto de Asis	Cory Coalition	1988
City Councilors	Noe Botor	Cory Coalition	1988
City Councilors	Erlinda Libunao	Cory Coalition	1988
City Councilors	Jose Grageda	Cory Coalition	1988
City Councilors	Rodolfo Fortuno	Cory Coalition	1988
City Councilors	Alfredo Cabral	LnB	1988
City Councilors	Carmen del Castillo	LnB	1988
City Councilors	Romeo Tayo	Cory Coalition	1988
City Councilors	Luis Ortega	Cory Coalition	1988
ABC President	Socorro Felix (Note: From November 16, 1988 to March 29, 1989.)	Nonpartisan	1988
ABC President	Julian Lavadia Jr. (Note: From June 7, 1989.)	Nonpartisan	1988
Kabataang Barangay President	Angelo Jacar (Note: From November 16, 1988 to January 6, 1993.)	Nonpartisan	1988

=== 2nd Sangguniang Panlungsod (1980–1988) ===
March 1980 – February 1, 1988
Position	Member	Party (Note: At election/appointment.)	Elected
Presiding Officer	Siegfredo Obias (Note: Died in office on December 26, 1986.)	KBL	1980
Presiding Officer	Efren Santos (Note: Councilor until March 14, 1987; served as OIC vice mayor from March 15 to December 1, 1987.)	KBL	—
Presiding Officer	Romeo Tablizo (Note: Officer-in-charge from December 4, 1987 to February 27, 1988.)	Independent	—
City Councilors	Felicimo de Asis (Note: Until June 30, 1986.)	KBL	1980
City Councilors	Restituta Imperial (Note: Until December 1, 1987.)	KBL	1980
City Councilors	Roberto Hernandez	KBL	1980
City Councilors	Benito Olivan	KBL	1980
City Councilors	Perfecto Palacio Jr.	KBL	1980
City Councilors	Temporo Dy (Note: Died in office on November 19, 1983.)	KBL	1980
City Councilors	Heli Miranda (Note: Until December 1, 1987.)	Unknown	— (Note: Appointed by President Ferdinand Marcos on February 11, 1982.)
City Councilors	Severiano Tacorda	Unknown	—
ABC President	J. Antonio Amparado (Note: From August 5, 1980 to June 30, 1986.)	Nonpartisan	1980
Kabataang Barangay President	Armando Aguja Jr. (Note: From November 4, 1980 to July 31, 1985.)	Nonpartisan	1980
Kagawads	Jose Cervantes (Note: Replacing Perfecto Palacio Jr.)	Unknown	— (Note: Appointed on July 1, 1986.)
Kagawads	Vicente Llagas Jr. (Note: Replacing Felicisimo de Asis.)	Unknown	—
Kagawads	Luis Ortega (Note: Replacing J. Antonio Amparado.)	Unknown	—
Kagawads	Rosario de Jesus (Note: Served as OIC Kagawad when regular members were considered resigned when they filed their certificates of candidacy for the 1988 local elections.)	Unknown	— (Note: Appointed on December 4, 1987.)
Kagawads	Jose Bailey	Unknown	—
Kagawads	Exequiel Grageda	Unknown	—
Kagawads	Alfredo Calara	Unknown	—
Kagawads	Modesto Abainza	Unknown	—
Kagawads	Graciano Felizmenio Sr.	Unknown	—

=== 1st Sangguniang Panlungsod (1976–1980) ===
February 1976 – February 1980
Position	Member
Presiding Officer	Carlos del Castillo
City Councilors	Armando Aguja Jr.
City Councilors	J. Antonio Amparado
City Councilors	Reynaldo Borja
City Councilors	Angel Casin
City Councilors	Raymundo Concha
City Councilors	Felicimo de Asis
City Councilors	Eduardo Enojado
City Councilors	William Enrile
City Councilors	Eusebio General (Note: Until December 1976.)
City Councilors	Rosauro Gonzales
City Councilors	Luciano Maggay
City Councilors	Heli Miranda
City Councilors	Perfecto Palacio Jr.
City Councilors	Virginia Perez
City Councilors	Esteban Rosales
City Councilors	Ramon San Andres
