= 1998 Naga, Camarines Sur, local elections =

11th Mayoral elections in the city of Naga, Camarines Sur

- May 11, 1998
- Mayoral election
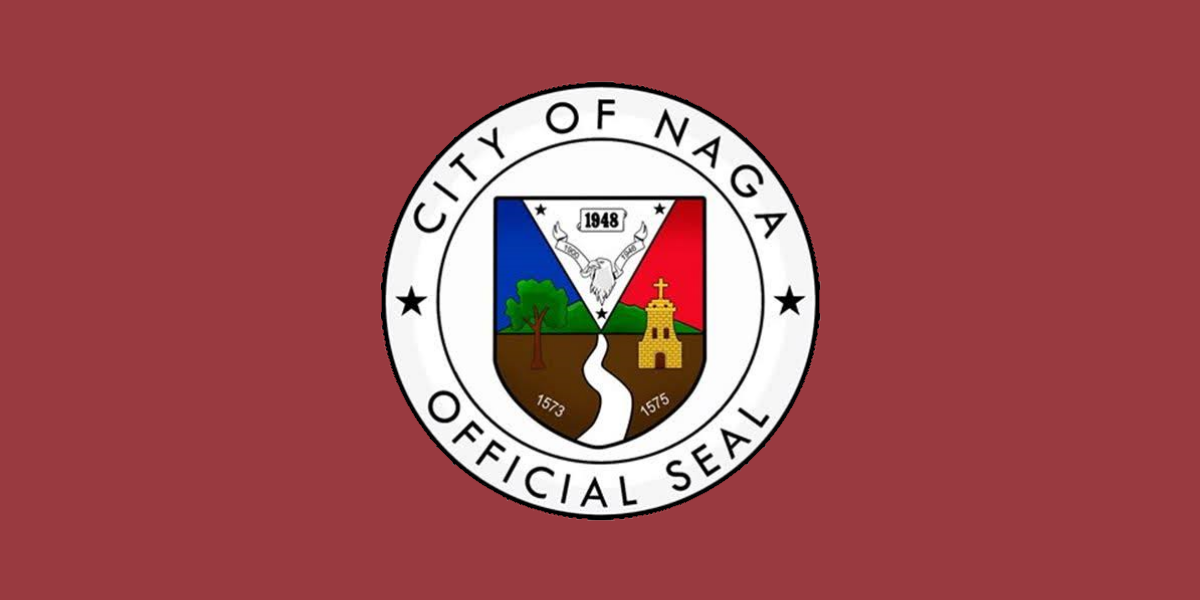
Candidate	Sulpicio S. Roco	Luis Raymund Villafuerte Jr.
Party	Aksyon	LAMMP
Running mate	Esteban Abonal Jr.	Juan Benito Dematera
Popular vote	32,026	14,351
Percentage	62.86%	28.17%
Mayor before election
Jesse Robredo
Lakas
Elected mayor
Sulpicio S. Roco
Aksyon
- Vice Mayoral election
Candidate	Esteban Abonal Jr.	Juan Benito Dematera
Party	Aksyon	LAMMP
Popular vote	22,303	9,816
Percentage	46.96%	20.67%
Vice Mayor before election
Lourdes V. Asence
Lakas
Elected Vice Mayor
Esteban Abonal Jr.
Aksyon

Local elections were held in Naga, Camarines Sur, on May 11, 1998, as part of the 1998 Philippine general election. Voters elected a mayor, vice mayor, ten members of the city council, and a representative for the second congressional district.

Incumbent mayor Jesse Robredo was term-limited after serving three consecutive terms and endorsed Sulpicio S. Roco Jr., who won the mayoral race with a landslide 62.9% of the vote under the banner of Aksyon Demokratiko. He defeated Luis Raymund Villafuerte Jr., among others. Robredo's coalition swept the elections, securing the vice mayoralty and all ten city council seats.

== Background ==
In 1995, Mayor Jesse Robredo of the Lakas–NUCD was re-elected for a third and final consecutive term, continuing the reform-oriented agenda he had championed since taking office in 1988. His administration was widely credited for transforming Naga into a model city for participatory governance, transparency, and urban innovation. Under his leadership, Naga received national and international recognition, including the prestigious Ramon Magsaysay Award for Government Service in 2000.

As Robredo was term-limited by 1998, his party sought to retain control of city hall by endorsing former city administrator Sulpicio S. Roco as their standard-bearer under the newly aligned Aksyon Demokratiko. Roco was a close ally of Robredo and positioned his campaign as a continuation of the Robredo legacy.

The 1998 elections also saw the entry of Luis Raymund Villafuerte Jr., son of former Camarines Sur governor Luis Villafuerte, into local politics. Running under the LAMMP coalition aligned with then-presidential candidate Joseph Estrada, Villafuerte aimed to wrest control of Naga City from the reformist camp. Other contenders included former city councilors and independent candidates, though none matched the popularity or organizational strength of the Robredo-aligned slate.

The election was seen as a critical test of whether Robredo's reform coalition could sustain its dominance beyond his tenure. In a decisive result, Roco won the mayoralty by a wide margin, and the administration's ticket swept all city council seats, reaffirming the coalition’s hold on power in Naga.

== Mayoral election ==
=== Candidates ===
- Sulpicio S. Roco (Aksyon)
- Luis Raymund Villafuerte Jr. (LAMMP)
- Agapito M. Tria (Lakas–NUCD)
- Lourdes V. Asence (Liberal)
- Glinton Ervas (Independent)
- Leonor Abias (Independent)

=== Results ===
1998 Naga City mayoral election
Candidate	Party	Votes	%
Sulpicio S. Roco	Aksyon	32,026	62.95
Luis Raymund Villafuerte Jr.	LAMMP	14,351	28.21
Agapito M. Tria	Lakas	2,361	4.64
Lourdes V. Asence	Liberal	2,091	4.11
Glinton Ervas	Independent	35	0.07
Leonor Abias	KBL	11	0.02
Total		50,875	100.00
Aksyon gain from Lakas			
Source: Commission on Elections

== Vice mayoral election ==
=== Results ===
1998 Naga City vice mayoral election
Candidate	Party	Votes	%
Esteban Abonal Jr.	Aksyon	22,303	46.96
Juan Benito Dematera	LAMMP	9,816	20.67
Jose Tuazon	Lakas	7,967	16.77
Jorge de Guzman	Liberal	7,410	15.60
Total		47,496	100.00
Aksyon gain from Lakas			
Source: Commission on Elections

== City Council election ==
Ten city councilors were elected. All ten winning candidates came from the Aksyon Demokratiko slate backed by mayoral winner Sulpicio Roco. The opposition candidates, primarily from LAMMP and the Liberal Party, failed to win any seats.

=== Results ===
1998 Naga City councilor election
Candidate	Party	Votes	%
Gabriel Bordado Jr.	Aksyon	22,158	6.00
Jose Rañola	Aksyon	21,587	5.85
Simeon Adan	Aksyon	20,211	5.48
Fiel Rosales	Independent	19,778	5.36
William Kalaw	Aksyon	18,917	5.12
Cecilia de Asis	Aksyon	18,398	4.98
Rodolfo Z. Fortuno	Aksyon	16,627	4.50
Francisco Felizmenio	Aksyon	16,361	4.43
Mila Arroyo	Aksyon	15,381	4.17
Jose Grageda	Aksyon	15,309	4.15
Maria Lucia Carpio	LAMMP	15,015	4.07
Jojo Villafuerte	LAMMP	14,582	3.95
Benjamin Lucena Jr.	Liberal	13,255	3.59
Romeo S. Tayo	LAMMP	12,838	3.48
Roland D. Cabral	LAMMP	12,691	3.44
Ulysses B. Botor	LAMMP	11,834	3.21
Jocelyn M. Cledera	LAMMP	11,387	3.08
Angel A. Cruz	LAMMP	10,642	2.88
Anthony Francis A. Sison III	LAMMP	8,065	2.18
Josue J. Navarette	LAMMP	7,320	1.98
Ernesto J. Idian	Liberal	6,331	1.72
Daisy C. Santos	Liberal	6,295	1.71
Benito B. Nate	Independent	5,323	1.44
Alexander P. Bichara	Lakas	4,981	1.35
Rachel N. General	Lakas	4,857	1.32
Marissa A. Gulapa	Liberal	4,149	1.12
Luis Isaac V. Aguirre	LAMMP	4,116	1.12
Francisco B. Dy	Lakas	3,704	1.00
Bernardita L. Anciano	Liberal	3,125	0.85
Clemente M. Besenio	Liberal	2,863	0.78
Emilio M. Aguinaldo	Lakas	2,756	0.75
Mario Chilon B. Basco	Lakas	2,435	0.66
Raymundo O. Concha	Lakas	2,161	0.59
Joaquin M. Calleja Jr.	Lakas	2,133	0.58
Rafael M. Duque	Liberal	2,079	0.56
Ruben V. Velasco	Liberal	1,998	0.54
Elmer B. Enciso Sr.	Independent	1,609	0.44
Rolando V. Salazar	Liberal	1,489	0.40
Ma. Teresa N. Clemeno	Lakas	1,339	0.36
Mario P. Franco	Liberal	1,199	0.32
Ruben R. Santiago	Lakas	965	0.26
Remigio S. Manchus	No party information	595	0.16
Josefina R. Desembrana	Independent	255	0.07
Total		369,113	100.00
Source: Commission on Elections
