= Tsinelas leadership =

Tsinelas leadership, a term derived from the Filipino word for flip-flops, refers to the rural grassroots and poverty alleviation program started by Interior Secretary Jesse Robredo, the husband of Vice President Leni Robredo, as Mayor of Naga, Camarines Sur.

== Concept ==
As mayor and mayoral spouse, Jesse and Leni Robredo initiated a consultative assembly in the far-flung barangays of the city to gather information on the needs of the local community. Both leaders have been noted to wear the practical foot wear of ordinary people, the "tsinelas" (or cheap flip-flops), even while traversing muddy terrain, which thus became a symbol of the struggles of the rural communities. This also became the symbol of solidarity used by Vice President Robredo during her campaign.

In order to continue and consolidate this grassroots program, a non-government foundation was launched as the Jesse M. Robredo Foundation, Inc. The foundation runs the Tsinelas Leadership Awards for the best practices of rural local government units. A fundraising program is organized yearly on the death anniversary of Jesse Robredo as a way to fund and reach the private initiatives of the foundation.
