= Mayor of Naga =

Mayor of Naga may refer to:

- Mayor of Naga, Camarines Sur, the head of the city government of Naga, Camarines Sur
- Mayor Naga, Cebu, the head of the city government of Naga, Cebu
- Mayor Naga, Zamboanga Sibugay, the head of the city government of Naga, Zamboanga Sibugay
