= 2010 Naga, Camarines Sur, local elections =

15th Mayoral elections in the city of Naga, Camarines Sur

- May 10, 2010
- Registered: 77,784
- Mayoral election
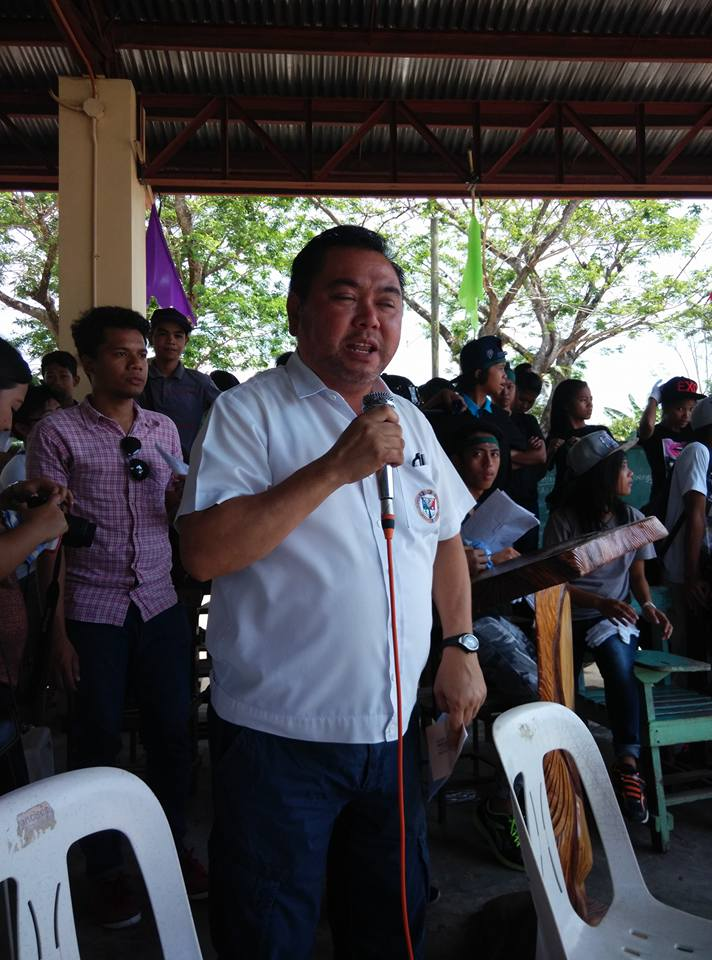

Candidate	John Bongat	Adan B. Botor	Sulpicio S. Roco Jr.
Party	Liberal	Nacionalista	Aksyon
Running mate	Gabriel Bordado
Popular vote	32,231	13,370
Percentage	%	%	%
Mayor before election
Jesse M. Robredo
Liberal
Elected mayor
John Bongat
Liberal
- Vice Mayoral election
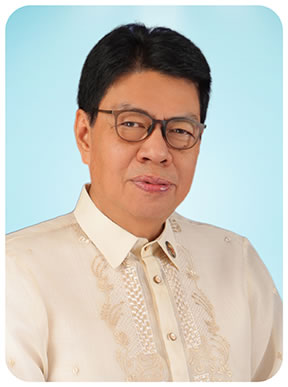

Candidate	Gabriel Bordado	Benjamin N. Lucena Jr.
Party	Liberal	NPC
Popular vote	37, 238	20,904
Percentage	%	%
Vice Mayor before election
Gabriel Bordado
Liberal
Elected Vice Mayor
Gabriel Bordado
Liberal

Local elections were held in Naga City, Camarines Sur, on May 10, 2010, as part of the 2010 Philippine general election. Voters elected a mayor, vice mayor, ten members of the Naga City Council, and one member of the House of Representatives of the Philippines.

== Background ==
The 2010 Naga City local elections were notable for the Liberal Party's dominance in the city, continuing the political legacy established by former Mayor Jesse M. Robredo. The Liberals maintained control over the mayoralty, vice mayoralty, and the majority of the city council seats.

The Liberal's slate was led by then-incumbent Vice Mayor John G. Bongat, who sought to succeed Jesse Robredo as mayor. The opposition was represented by Atty. Adan Botor.

== Mayoral election ==
In the mayoral race, John G. Bongat secured a decisive victory with 32,231 votes, accounting for 78% of the total votes cast. His closest opponent, Atty. Adan Botor, garnered 13,370 votes.

=== Candidates ===
==== Declared ====
- John G. Bongat (Liberal), former city council member
- Adan B. Botor (Nacionalista)
- Sulpicio S. Roco Jr. (Aksyon), former congressman
- Roderick C. Olea (Independent)
- Luis A. Ortega (Independent)

=== Results ===
John Bongat won majority by a wide margin.

2010 Naga, Camarines Sur, mayoral election
Candidate	Party	Votes	%
John G. Bongat	Liberal	32,231	70.68
Adan B. Botor	Nacionalista	13,370	29.32
Sulpicio S. Roco Jr.	Aksyon		
Roderick C. Olea	Independent		
Luis A. Ortega	Independent		
Total		45,601	100.00
Liberal hold			
Source: Commission on Elections

== Vice mayoral election ==
=== Candidates ===
==== Declared ====
- Gabriel Bordado (Liberal), incumbent vice mayor
- David Casper Nathan Sergio (NPC)
- Irineo F. Llorin Jr. (Independent)

=== Results ===
2010 Naga, Camarines Sur, vice mayoral election
Candidate	Party	Votes	%
Gabriel Bordado	Liberal	37,238	72.31
Benjamin N. Lucena Jr.	NPC	14,261	27.69
Irineo F. Llorin Jr.	Independent		
Total		51,499	100.00
Liberal hold			
Source: Commission on Elections

== 2010 Naga City Council election ==
The Naga City Council is composed of 12 councillors, 10 of whom are elected.

=== Overview ===
Party	Votes	%	Seats
Liberal	293,612	65.67	10
NPC	105,315	23.55	0
Aksyon	23,409	5.24	0
Lakas–Kampi	10,494	2.35	0
Independent	14,299	3.20	0
Ex officio seats			2
Total	447,129	100.00	12

2010 Naga City Council election
Candidate	Party	Votes	%
Cecilia De Asis	Liberal	33,064	7.75
Nelson Legacion	Liberal	31,896	7.48
Esteban Abonal Jr.	Liberal	29,420	6.90
David Casper Nathan Sergio	Liberal	27,091	6.35
Maria Elizabeth Lavadia	Liberal	26,848	6.29
Ray-An Cydrick Rentoy	Liberal	26,579	6.23
Jose Tuason	Liberal	26,052	6.11
Salvador Del Castillo	Liberal	25,717	6.03
Joaquin Perez Jr.	Liberal	24,279	5.69
Raoul Rosales	Liberal	21,666	5.08
Jessie Albeus	NPC	14,361	3.37
Francis Jake Fortaleza	NPC	12,430	2.91
Joel Morano	Aksyon	12,219	2.86
Francia Teresa Rivera	NPC	11,910	2.79
Victor Cabrera	Aksyon	11,190	2.62
Jose Peñas III	NPC	9,982	2.34
Josue Perez Sr.	NPC	9,694	2.27
Edwin Felipe Hidalgo	NPC	9,657	2.26
Rowena Decena	NPC	9,337	2.19
Ernesto Abragan	NPC	8,612	2.02
Marlon Nasol	NPC	8,288	1.94
Nelson Pelagio	NPC	7,655	1.79
Juan Decena	Lakas–Kampi	6,498	1.52
Jose Jacobo Sr.	Independent	4,352	1.02
Maria Lilia Aracosta	Lakas–Kampi	3,996	0.94
Rodolfo Bongapat	Independent	3,401	0.80
Paul Niño Aguilar	Independent	3,071	0.72
Roland Moreno	Independent	2,343	0.55
Domingo Cantillo	Independent	1,921	0.45
Charlemagne Seechung	Independent	1,147	0.27
Virginia Ida Tindugan	Independent	1,110	0.26
Felix Riva	Independent	793	0.19
Total		426,579	100.00
Source: Commission on Elections
