= 2013 Naga, Camarines Sur, local elections =

- May 13, 2013
- Registered: 78,500
- Mayoral election
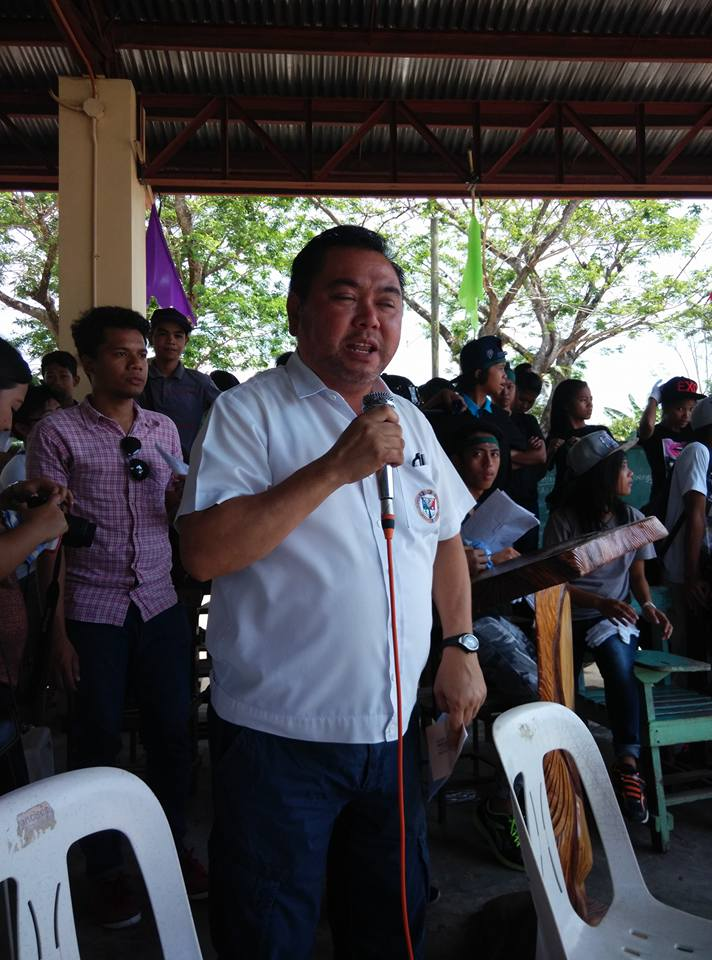

| Candidate | John Bongat | Jun Pelagio |
| Party | Liberal | Independent |
| Running mate | Nelson Legacion |
| Popular vote | 39,423 | 7,277 |
| Percentage | 81.58% | 15.06% |
Mayor before election
John Bongat
Liberal
Elected mayor
John Bongat
Liberal
- Vice Mayoral election
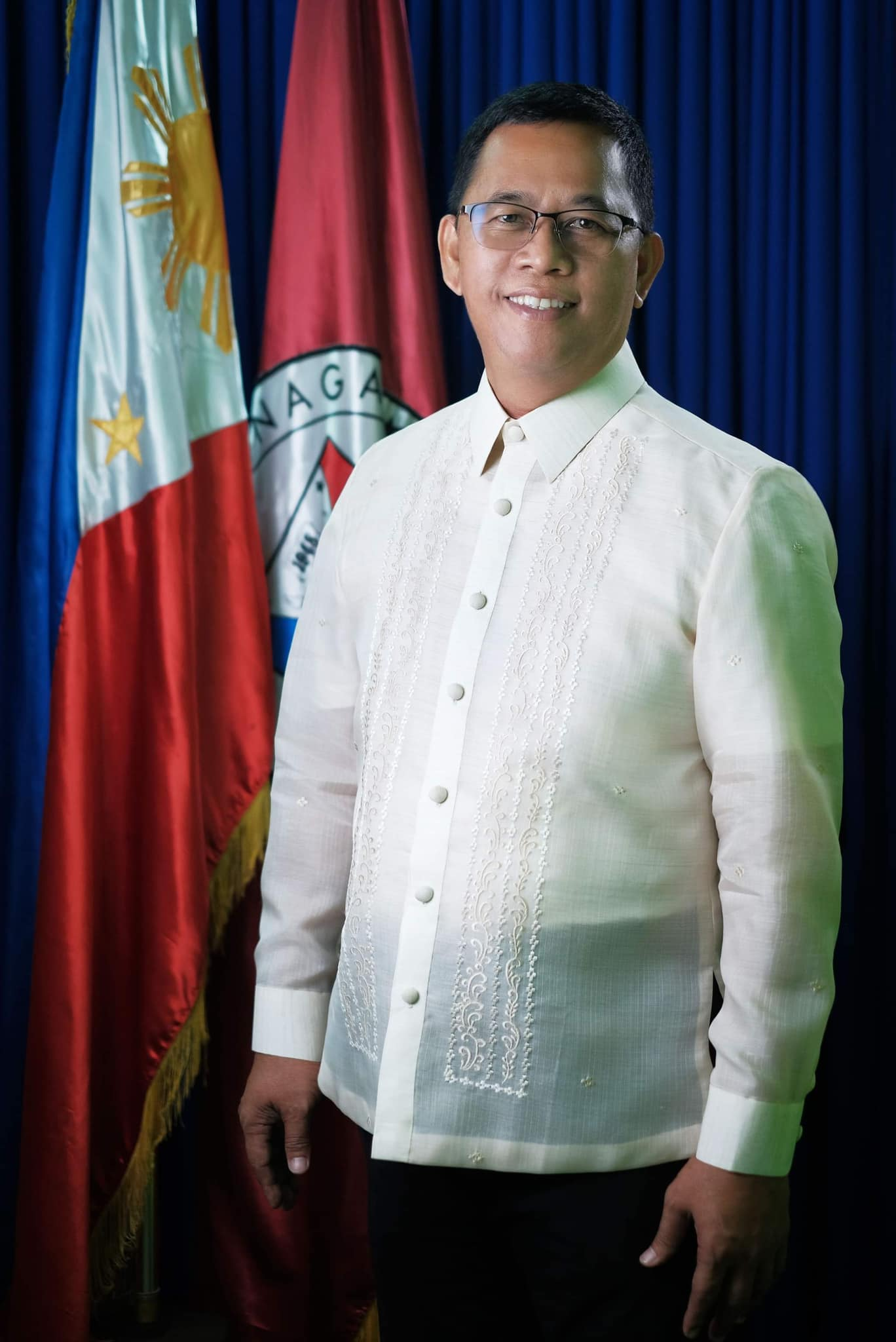

| Candidate | Nelson Legacion | Sulpicio Roco |
| Party | Liberal | NPC |
| Popular vote | 26,471 | 22,184 |
| Percentage | 54.40% | 45.60% |
Vice Mayor before election
Gabriel Bordado
Liberal
Elected Vice Mayor
Nelson Legacion
Liberal

Local elections were held in Naga City on May 13, 2013, within the Philippine general election. The voters voted for the elective local posts in the city: the mayor, vice mayor, and ten councilors.

== Background ==
In 2013, the Liberal Party dominated the local elections in Naga City, winning the mayoralty, vice mayoralty, and a majority of the city council seats. The city is widely regarded as a stronghold of the Robredo family and the Liberal Party, with voters consistently supporting LP-aligned candidates at both the local and national levels.

Then-Congresswoman Leni Robredo, the widow of the late former mayor and Interior Secretary Jesse Robredo, was elected to the Philippine House of Representatives in 2013, representing the 3rd District of Camarines Sur. Her victory further cemented the Robredo family's influence in the city.

== Mayoral election ==
The 2013 Naga City mayoral election was held on May 13, 2013, as part of the 2013 Philippine general elections. Incumbent Mayor John Bongat ran for re-election under the Liberal Party and won a decisive victory. He won with over 81% of the vote, defeating Pelagio and Ortega by a wide margin.

=== Candidates ===
==== Declared ====
- John Bongat (Liberal), incumbent mayor of Naga
- Jun Pelagio (Independent)
- Luis Ortega (Independent)

=== Results ===
Naga City mayoralty election
| Party | Candidate | Votes | % |
|---|---|---|---|
| Liberal | John Bongat | 39,423 | 81.58 |
| Independent | Jun Pelagio | 20,277 | 15.06 |
| Independent | Luis Ortega | 1,627 | 3.37 |
| Total votes | | 48,327 | 100.00 |
| Liberal hold | | | |

== Vice mayoral elections ==
Councilor Nelson Legacion won the elections against former mayor and former 2nd district representative Sulpicio Roco Jr.

Naga City vice mayoralty election
| Party | Candidate | Votes | % |
|---|---|---|---|
| Liberal | Nelson Legacion | 26,471 | 54.41 |
| NPC | Sulpicio "Cho" Roco Jr. | 22,184 | 45.59 |
| Total votes | | 48,655 | 100.00 |
| Liberal hold | | | |

== City Council elections ==
Election in the city council is at large at 10 seats will be on the line.

| Party | Votes | % | Seats |
|---|---|---|---|
| Liberal Party | 294,731 | 75.98 | 10 |
| NPC | 85,549 | 22.05 | 0 |
| Independent | 7,610 | 1.96 | 0 |
| Total | 387,890 | 100.00 | 10 |

Naga City Council election
| Party | Candidate | Votes | % |
|---|---|---|---|
| Liberal | Gabriel Bordado | 33,057 | 8.52 |
| Liberal | Cecilla de Asis | 31,840 | 8.21 |
| Liberal | Esteban Abonal III | 28,654 | 7.39 |
| Liberal | David Nathan Sergio | 28,592 | 7.37 |
| Liberal | Ma. Elizabeth Lavadia | 27,224 | 7.02 |
| Liberal | Chito Perez | 26,724 | 6.89 |
| Liberal | Elmer Baldemoro | 26,174 | 6.75 |
| Liberal | Mila Raquid-Arroyo | 25,766 | 6.64 |
| Liberal | Jose Tuason | 23,872 | 6.15 |
| Liberal | Ray-an Rentoy | 22,828 | 5.88 |
| NPC | Jessie Albeus | 17,438 | 4.50 |
| NPC | Winnie Ventura | 15,749 | 4.06 |
| NPC | Anthony Francis Sison | 12,193 | 3.14 |
| NPC | Jose Penas III | 12,013 | 3.10 |
| NPC | Anjo Santos | 10,867 | 2.80 |
| NPC | Marlon Nasol | 8,837 | 2.28 |
| NPC | Francine Rivera-Behrendt | 8,452 | 2.18 |
| Independent | Joel Morano | 3,603 | 0.93 |
| Independent | Roland Moreno | 2,484 | 0.64 |
| Independent | Felix Riva | 1,523 | 0.39 |
| Total votes | | 387,890 | 100.00 |
