= 2007 Naga, Camarines Sur, local elections =

14th Mayoral elections in the city of Naga, Camarines Sur

- May 14, 2007
- Registered: 70,520
- Mayoral election
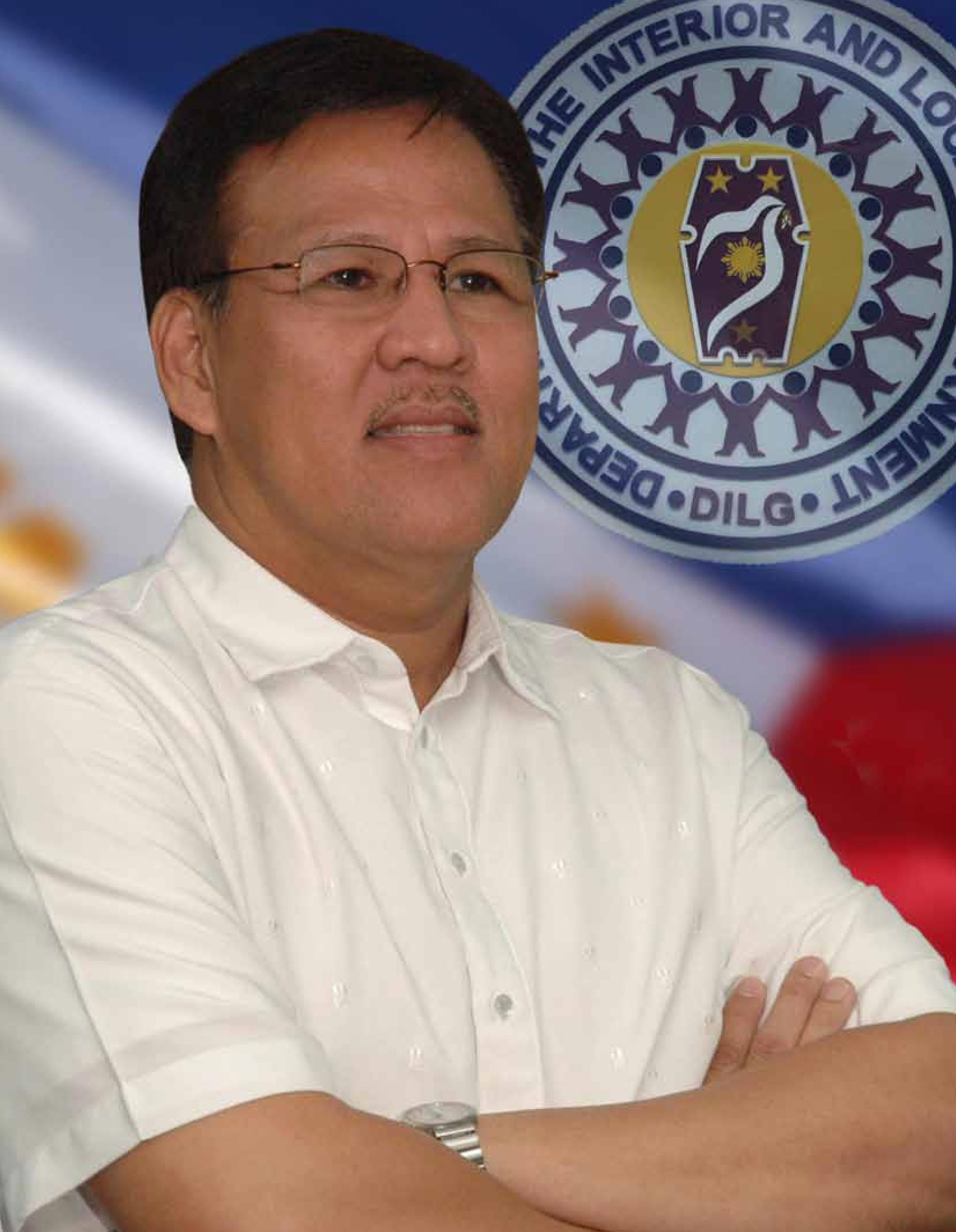

| Candidate | Jesse Robredo | Jojo Villafuerte |
| Party | Liberal | KAMPI |
| Running mate | Gabriel Bordado | Juan Carpio |
| Popular vote | 37,549 | 11,537 |
| Percentage | 76.25 | 23.43 |
Mayor before election
Jesse Robredo
Liberal
Elected mayor
Jesse Robredo
Liberal
- Vice Mayoral election
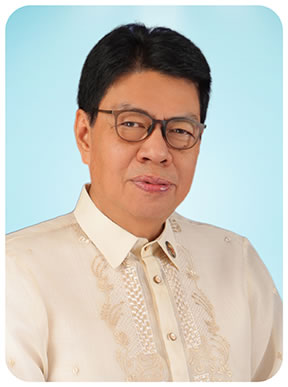

| Candidate | Gabriel Bordado | Juan Carpio |
| Party | Liberal | KAMPI |
| Popular vote | 31,470 | 12,895 |
| Percentage | 70.93 | 29.07 |
Vice Mayor before election
Gabriel Bordado
Liberal
Elected Vice Mayor
Gabriel Bordado
Liberal

Local elections were held in Naga City, Camarines Sur, on May 14, 2007, as part of the 2007 Philippine general election. Voters elected a mayor, vice mayor, ten members of the Naga City Council, and one member of the House of Representatives of the Philippines.

== Background ==
The 2007 Naga City local elections took place during the midterm elections under the administration of President Gloria Macapagal Arroyo. These elections were particularly significant in the city, as the administration-aligned party fielded a complete slate of candidates to challenge the incumbent Liberal Party leadership that had dominated the city's political landscape for years.

At the time, Naga City was under the stewardship of Mayor Jesse Robredo, a widely respected reformist leader affiliated with the Liberal Party. Robredo, who was serving his third term (or sixth term, counting non-consecutive terms) as mayor, was known for his emphasis on participatory governance and anti-corruption measures.

Seeking to break the Liberal Party’s hold on local power, the administration-backed slate included candidates for mayor, vice mayor, and a full list of city council aspirants. The opposition hoped to capitalize on national political momentum and expand influence in a key Bicol city.

Despite the strong challenge, the 2007 elections reaffirmed the Liberal Party’s political dominance in Naga, with the incumbent group retaining the majority of elective positions, including elective seats in the city council.

== Mayoral election ==
In the mayoral race, incumbent mayor Jesse Robredo secured a commanding re-election victory against Jojo Villafuerte, a member of the influential Villafuerte political family.

=== Candidates ===
==== Declared ====
- Jesse Robredo (Liberal), incumbent mayor
- Jojo Villafuerte (KAMPI)
- Salam Emilio Delfin (Independent)

=== Results ===
Jesse Robredo won by a landslide.

2007 Naga, Camarines Sur, mayoral election
| Candidate | Party | Votes | % |
|---|---|---|---|
| Jesse Robredo | Liberal | 37,549 | 76.25 |
| Jojo Villafuerte | KAMPI | 11,537 | 23.43 |
| Salam Emilio Delfin | Independent | 157 | 0.32 |
| Total | | 49,243 | 100.00 |
| Liberal hold | | | |
Source: Commission on Elections

== Vice mayoral election ==
=== Candidates ===
==== Declared ====
- Gabriel Bordado Jr. (Liberal), incumbent vice mayor
- Antonio Luis Carpio (KAMPI)

=== Results ===
2007 Naga, Camarines Sur, vice mayoral election
| Candidate | Party | Votes | % |
|---|---|---|---|
| Gabriel Bordado Jr. | Liberal | 31,470 | 70.93 |
| Antonio Luis Carpio | KAMPI | 12,895 | 29.07 |
| Total | | 44,365 | 100.00 |
| Liberal hold | | | |
Source: Commission on Elections

== 2007 Naga City Council election ==
The Naga City Council is composed of 12 councillors, 10 of whom are elected by the public. The remaining two are ex officio members.

| Party | Votes | % | Seats |
|---|---|---|---|
| Liberal Party | 0 | – | 9 |
| Aksyon | 0 | – | 1 |
| KAMPI | 0 | – | 0 |
| Total | | | 10 |

Naga City Council election
| Candidate | Party | Votes | % |
|---|---|---|---|
| John G. Bongat | Liberal | 37,812 | 10.25 |
| Esteban Abonal Jr. | Liberal | 30,723 | 8.33 |
| Bernadette Roco | Aksyon | 30,459 | 8.25 |
| Lourdes Asence | Liberal | 29,705 | 8.05 |
| William Del Rosario | Liberal | 29,014 | 7.86 |
| Jose Tuason | Liberal | 28,100 | 7.62 |
| Salvador Del Castillo | Liberal | 27,851 | 7.55 |
| David Casper Nathan Sergio | Liberal | 27,806 | 7.54 |
| Nelson Legacion | Liberal | 27,732 | 7.52 |
| Elizabeth Lavadia | Liberal | 26,412 | 7.16 |
| Ramon Perez | KAMPI | 10,199 | 2.76 |
| Jake Fortaleza | KAMPI | 8,509 | 2.31 |
| Edwin Felipe Hidalgo | KAMPI | 8,106 | 2.20 |
| Emil Aguinaldo | KAMPI | 7,843 | 2.13 |
| Felix Repuyan Jr. | KAMPI | 6,987 | 1.89 |
| Edgardo Imperial | KAMPI | 6,681 | 1.81 |
| Ernesto Abragan | KAMPI | 6,184 | 1.68 |
| Leopoldo Silva | KAMPI | 6,091 | 1.65 |
| Mario Chilon Basco | KAMPI | 6,084 | 1.65 |
| Wilfredo Candelaria | KAMPI | 5,314 | 1.44 |
| Roderick Olea | Independent | 1,396 | 0.38 |
| Total | | 369,008 | 100.00 |
