= Ramon Felipe Jr. =

Filipino lawyer and politician (1920–2017)

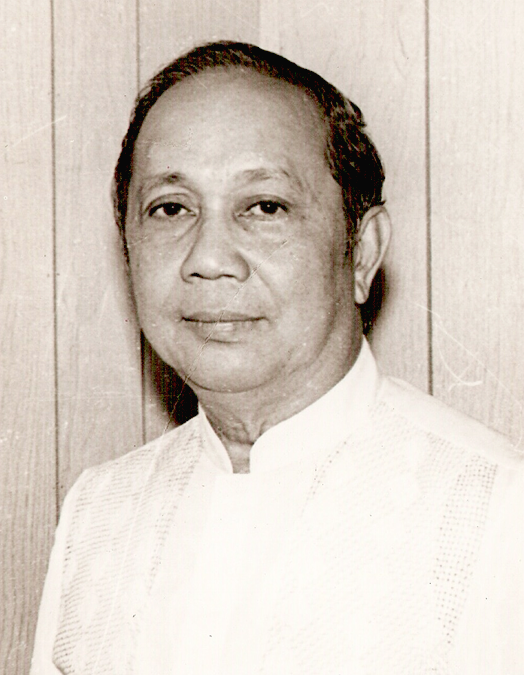

House Minority Leader
- In office January 24, 1972 – January 17, 1973
- Preceded by: Ramon Mitra Jr.
- Succeeded by: Hilario Davide Jr. (as Minority Leader of the Interim Batasang Pambansa)

Member of the Philippine House of Representatives from Camarines Sur's 1st district
- In office December 30, 1965 – January 17, 1973
- Preceded by: Juan Triviño
- Succeeded by: District abolished (seat next held by Rolando Andaya Sr. in 1987)

Chairman of the Commission on Elections
- In office July 23, 1986 – February 3, 1988
- Appointed by: Corazon Aquino
- Preceded by: Himself (as acting chairperson)
- Succeeded by: Hilario Davide Jr.
- Acting
- In office April 11, 1986 – July 23, 1986
- Appointed by: Corazon Aquino
- Preceded by: Victorino Savellano
- Succeeded by: Himself (as permanent chairperson)

Commissioner of the Commission on Elections
- In office March 21, 1984 – May 17, 1990
- Appointed by: Ferdinand Marcos; Corazon Aquino

Mayor of Naga
- In office January 1964 – September 10, 1965
- Vice Mayor: Vicente Sibulo
- Preceded by: Mariano Villafuerte Jr.
- Succeeded by: Vicente Sibulo

Personal details
- Born: Ramon Hidalgo Felipe Jr. March 11, 1920 Naga, Camarines Sur, Philippine Islands
- Died: June 15, 2017 (aged 97)
- Party: Liberal
- Spouse: Aida de Belen Abella
- Children: 8

Ramon Hidalgo Felipe Jr. (March 11, 1920 – June 15, 2017) was a Filipino lawyer and politician who served as the 14th chairman of the Commission on Elections from 1986 to 1988 and House minority leader from 1972 to 1973. He represented Camarines Sur's first district in the House of Representatives from 1965 to 1973.

== Early life and education ==
Felipe was born on March 11, 1920, in Naga, Camarines Sur, to former provincial governor Ramon B. Felipe and Rosalia Felin Hidalgo. He completed his primary education at the Naga Barrio Training School and the Naga Normal Training School, graduating as valedictorian of his class in 1932. He initially enrolled at Camarines Sur Provincial High School for his freshman year but later transferred to the Ateneo de Manila University, where he completed his secondary education with first honors.

He attended the Ateneo de Manila University, where he graduated summa cum laude with an AB degree in 1940 and earned his Bachelor of Laws degree in 1942. He served as president of the Ateneo Student Council and was a member of the Ateneo College of Law debate team.

He placed third in the 1944 Bar examinations with an average of 94.9% before formally graduating from law school.

From 1957 to 1958, he served as president of the Naga chapter of Junior Chamber International.

== Political career ==
=== Early political career ===
Felipe ran for mayor of Naga in 1959 but lost to incumbent Victorino Ojeda.

In November 1963, Felipe was elected mayor of Naga. He was known for spearheading projects that included the paving of city streets, the installation of mercury-vapor street lamps, reforms within the local police department, and an increase in the basic salaries of city employees from ₱120 to ₱180.

=== House of Representatives (1965–1973) ===
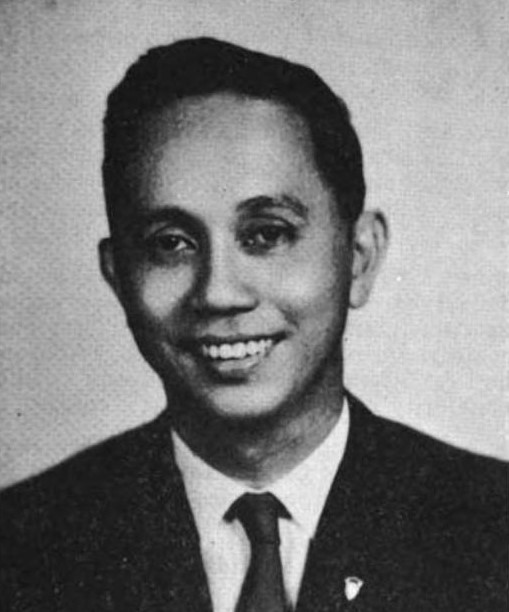
Felipe in the 6th Congress

Felipe resigned as mayor in September 1965 to run for Camarines Sur's 1st district seat in the House of Representatives. He defeated incumbent Juan Triviño, carrying 16 of the district's 18 municipalities. He served as the last House minority leader from the Liberal Party before the abolition of Congress in 1973 following President Ferdinand Marcos's declaration of martial law.

=== Post-congressional career ===
After his congressional career, Felipe returned to private legal practice. He was unsuccessful in his bid for reelection as mayor of Naga in 1980.

In 1984, amid growing pressure to appoint a member of the opposition to oversee the elections to the Regular Batasang Pambansa, President Marcos appointed Felipe as a commissioner of the Commission on Elections. After Marcos was ousted during the People Power Revolution in 1986, Felipe was appointed acting chairman of the commission by President Corazon Aquino in April 1986. He was later sworn in as permanent chairman in July 1986, serving until his retirement in 1988.

== Personal life ==
Felipe was married to Aida de Belen Abella, with whom he had eight children: Cecile, Annabel, Amelia, Marlene, Emerito, Ramon IV, Antero, and Jesus.

Felipe died on June 15, 2017, at the age of 97.

== Electoral history ==
Electoral history of Ramon Felipe Jr.
Year	Office	Party	Votes received				Result
Year	Office	Party	Total	%	P.	Swing	Result
1959	Mayor of Naga	Liberal	—N/a	—N/a	2nd	—N/a	Lost
1963	Mayor of Naga	Liberal	—N/a	—N/a	1st	—N/a	Won
1980	Mayor of Naga	Liberal	15,029	43.55%	2nd	—N/a	Lost
1965	Representative (Camarines Sur–1st)	Independent Liberal	8,815	—N/a	1st	—N/a	Won
1969	Representative (Camarines Sur–1st)	Liberal	—N/a	—N/a	1st	—N/a	Won

House of Representatives of the Philippines
Preceded by Ramon Mitra Jr.	House Minority Leader; January 24, 1972 – January 17, 1973	Succeeded by Hilario Davide Jr. (as Minority Leader of the Batasang Pambansa)
Preceded by Juan Triviño	Member for Camarines Sur's 1st district December 30, 1965 – January 17, 1973	Vacant Martial law and adoption of the 1973 Constitution Title next held by Rolando Andaya Sr.
Political offices
Preceded by Victorino Savellano	Chairman of the Commission on Elections; April 11, 1986 – February 3, 1988 (Acting from April 11 to July 23, 1986)	Succeeded by Hilario Davide Jr.
Preceded by Mariano Villafuerte Jr.	Mayor of Naga; January 1964 – September 10, 1965	Succeeded by Vicente Sibulo
