= 1995 Naga, Camarines Sur, local elections =

10th Mayoral elections in the city of Naga, Camarines Sur

- May 8, 1995
- Mayoral election
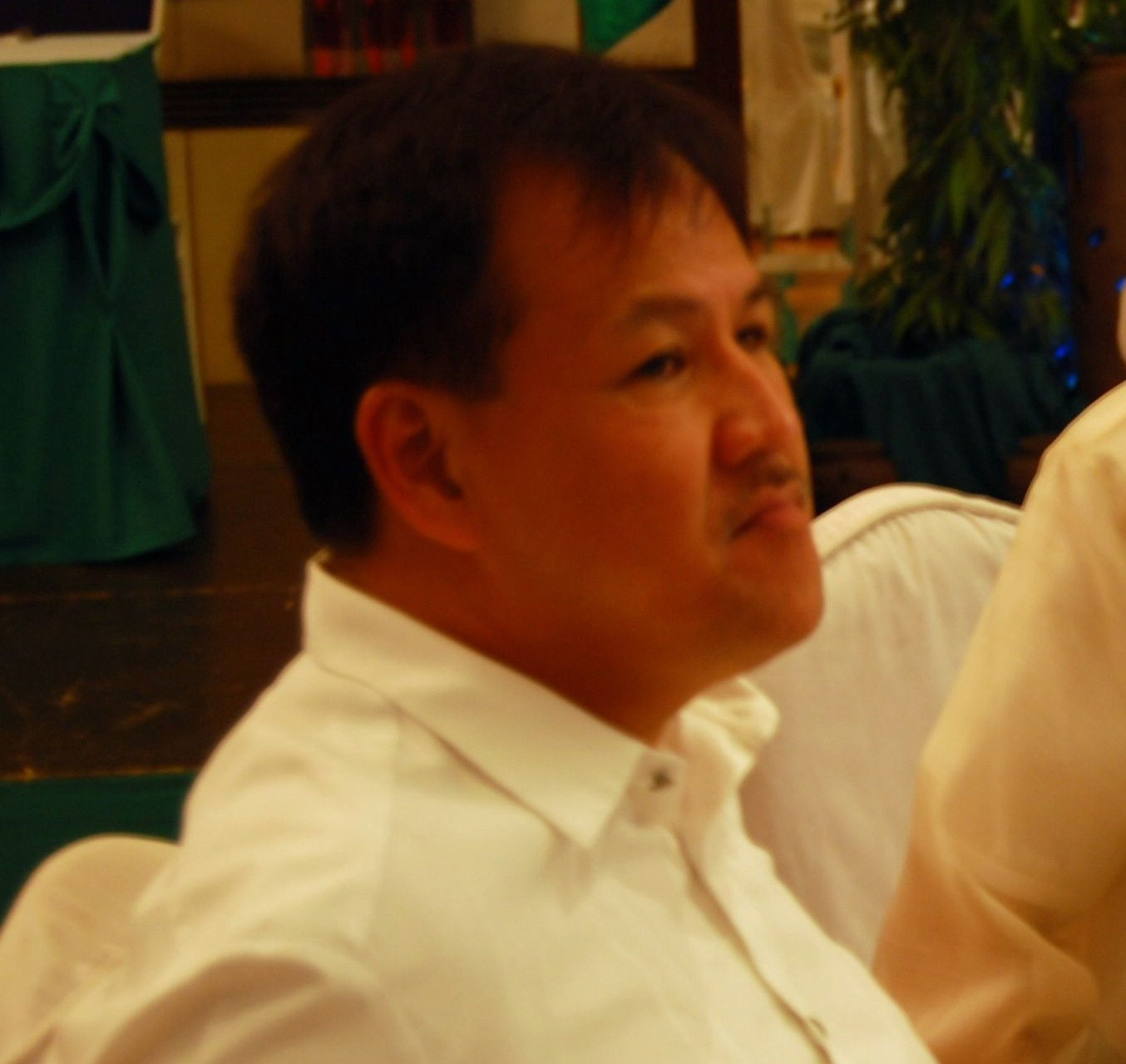

Candidate	Jesse Robredo	Jose H. Felipe
Party	Lakas	Independent
Alliance	Lakas–Laban
Running mate	Lourdes Asence
Popular vote	38,408	997
Percentage	96.91%	2.52%
Mayor before election
Jesse Robredo
Lakas
Elected mayor
Jesse Robredo
Lakas
- Vice Mayoral election
Candidate	Lourdes Asence
Party	Lakas
Alliance	Lakas–Laban
Popular vote	36,575
Percentage	100%
Vice Mayor before election
Lourdes Asence
Lakas
Elected Vice Mayor
Lourdes Asence
Lakas

Local elections were held in Naga City on May 8, 1995, as part of the 1995 Philippine general election. Voters elected a mayor, vice mayor, and ten city councilors. Jesse Robredo of the ruling party Lakas–NUCD–UMDP was re-elected mayor in a landslide, securing his third and final consecutive term.

== Background ==
In 1992, Jesse Robredo was re-elected as mayor of Naga City under the Lakas–NUCD banner, winning a second term with a wide margin. During his second term, Robredo deepened his administration’s reforms in participatory governance, urban development, and anti-corruption measures. These efforts further solidified his reputation both locally and nationally, with Naga emerging as a model for effective local governance.

By the lead-up to the 1995 elections, Robredo’s political coalition had grown in influence, attracting civic leaders and technocrats into local politics. Lourdes V. Asence also sought re-election as vice mayor, running alongside Robredo under the same party. Their administration was credited for improving basic services and fostering greater transparency, particularly through citizen consultations and budget participation.

== Results ==
=== Mayoral election ===
1995 Naga mayoral election
Candidate	Party	Votes	%
Jesse Robredo	Lakas	38,408	96.91
Jose H. Felipe	Independent	997	2.52
Edmundo Magistrado	Independent	229	0.58
Total		39,634	100.00
Lakas hold			
Source: Commission on Elections

=== Vice mayoral election ===
1995 Naga vice mayoral election
Candidate	Party	Votes	%
Lourdes V. Asence	Lakas	36,575	100.00
Total		36,575	100.00
Lakas hold			
Source: Commission on Elections

=== City Council election ===
Ten councilors were elected. The administration slate won all seats.

1995 Naga City election
Candidate	Party	Votes	%
Fiel L. Rosales	Independent (aligned with Robredo)	25,290	8.82
Esteban R. Abonal	Lakas	25,115	8.76
Janet B. Soler	Lakas	24,173	8.43
Jose A. Tuason	Lakas	23,757	8.28
Jose C. Rañola	Lakas	22,729	7.92
Jaime D. Jacob	Independent (aligned with Robredo)	22,032	7.68
Simeon F. Adan	Lakas	20,467	7.14
Gabriel H. Bordado Jr.	Lakas	19,503	6.80
Jorge S. de Guzman	Lakas	18,912	6.59
Socorro B. Felix	Lakas	17,893	6.24
Jojo L. Villafuerte	Laban	14,704	5.13
Romeo S. Tayo	Laban	13,213	4.61
Ulysses B. Botor	Laban	11,871	4.14
Victorio A. Aguila	Laban	8,977	3.13
Jose V. Reniva	Laban	6,784	2.37
Bernardita L. Anciano	Independent	6,283	2.19
Poriforio A. Especio	Independent	2,034	0.71
Remigio S. Manchus	Independent	1,440	0.50
Sadam E. Delfin	Independent	1,332	0.46
Roberto D. Saballegue Jr.	Independent	323	0.11
Total		286,832	100.00
Source: Commission on Elections
