= 2001 Naga, Camarines Sur, local elections =

12th Mayoral elections in the city of Naga, Camarines Sur

- May 14, 2001
- Mayoral election
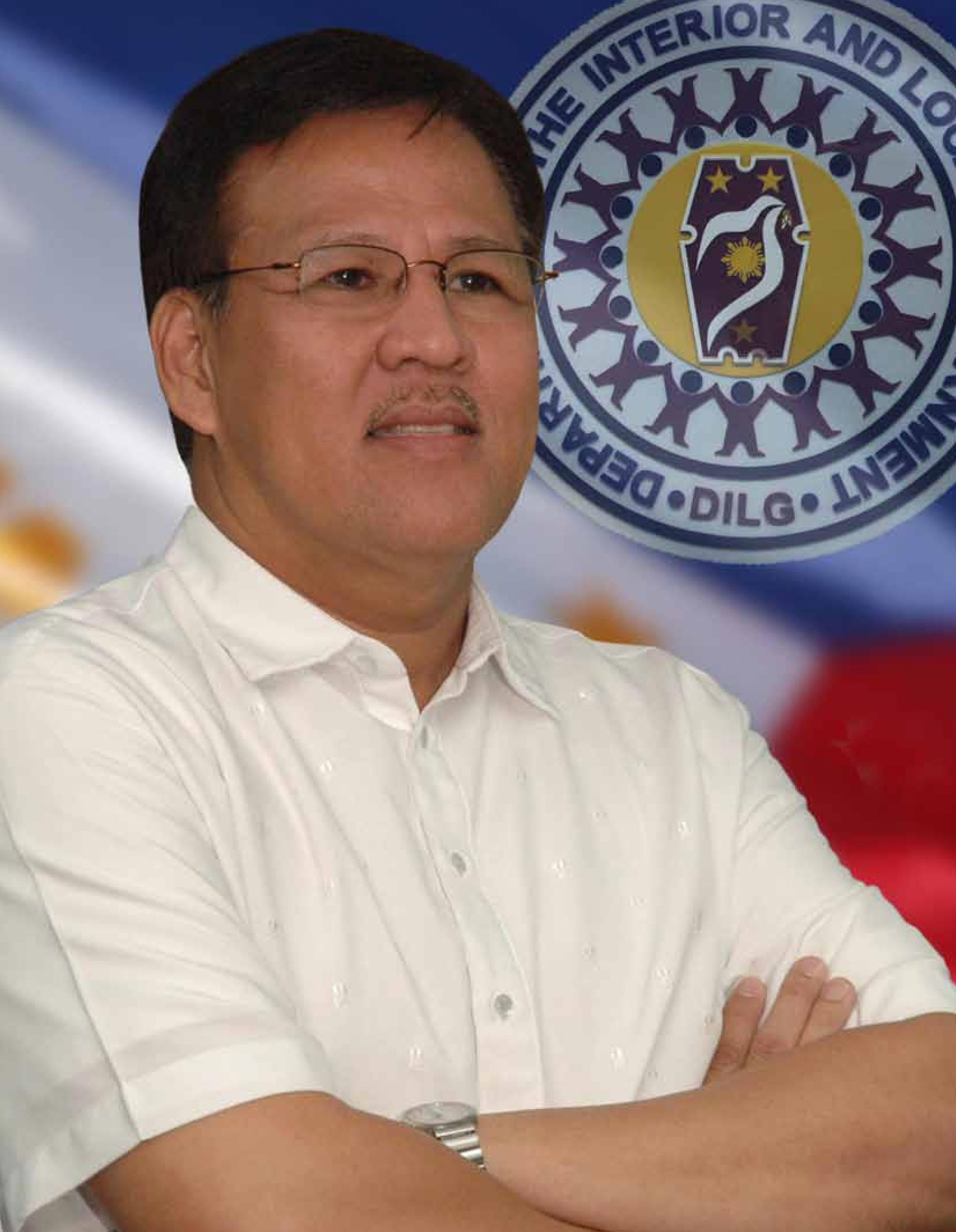

Candidate	Jesse Robredo	Rodolfo Z. Fortuno
Party	Lakas	LDP
Running mate	Esteban R. Abonal Jr. (Aksyon)	Lina A. General
Popular vote	34,986	6,784
Percentage	83.00	16.09
Mayor before election
Sulpicio S. Roco Jr.
Aksyon
Elected mayor
Jesse Robredo
Lakas
- Vice Mayoral election

Candidate	Esteban R. Abonal Jr.	Fiel L. Rosales	Lina A. General
Party	Aksyon	Independent	LDP
Popular vote	20,219	14,397	6,540
Percentage	49.13	34.98	15.89
Vice Mayor before election
Esteban R. Abonal Jr.
Aksyon
Elected Vice Mayor
Esteban R. Abonal Jr.
Aksyon

Local elections were held in Naga City, Camarines Sur, on May 14, 2001, as part of the 2001 Philippine general election. Voters elected a mayor, vice mayor, and members of the Naga City Council.

== Background ==
In 1998, Jesse Robredo was term-limited after serving three consecutive terms as mayor of Naga City. His long-time ally and former city administrator Sulpicio S. Roco ran under the reform-oriented Aksyon Demokratiko banner and won the mayoralty in a landslide, continuing the governance model Robredo had institutionalized. Roco’s administration maintained the participatory governance mechanisms and developmental agenda established in the Robredo years, and the Aksyon-led coalition swept all major local positions.

By 2001, the political landscape in Naga was undergoing a shift. Roco, after serving a single term as mayor, chose not to seek re-election, paving the way for a political comeback by Jesse Robredo, who had taken a brief hiatus from politics following his term limit. Robredo filed his candidacy under the newly formed local party "NagAksyon", a merger of Aksyon Demokratiko loyalists and civic leaders.

The 2001 elections marked Robredo’s bid to return to city hall and resume his reform agenda, this time with broader grassroots mobilization and deeper organizational backing. His main rival was LDP candidate Rodolfo Fortuno.

The contest was seen as a referendum on whether Naga’s electorate would reaffirm its commitment to Robredo’s governance style or shift toward a more traditional political machinery. Ultimately, Robredo won decisively, signaling public approval of his leadership legacy and returning him to the mayoralty.

== Mayoral election ==
In the mayoral race, former mayor Jesse Robredo returned to office under the banner of the Lakas–NUCD–UMDP. He previously served as mayor from 1988 to 1998.

=== Results ===
2001 Naga, Camarines Sur, mayoral election
Candidate	Party	Votes	%
Jesse Robredo	Lakas–NUCD–UMDP	34,986	83.00
Rodolfo Fortuno	LDP	6,784	16.09
Edmundo Magistrado	Independent	293	0.70
Glinton Ervan	Independent	87	0.21
Total		42,150	100.00
Lakas–NUCD–UMDP gain from Aksyon			
Source: Commission on Elections

== Vice mayoral election ==
=== Results ===
2001 Naga, Camarines Sur, vice mayoral election
Candidate	Party	Votes	%
Esteban Abonal Jr.	Aksyon	20,219	49.13
Fiel Rosales	Independent	14,397	34.98
Lina General	LDP	6,540	15.89
Total		41,156	100.00
Aksyon hold			
Source: Commission on Elections

== City Council election ==
The Naga City Council is composed of 12 councillors, 10 of whom are elected by the public. The remaining two are ex officio members.

2001 Naga City Council election
Candidate	Party	Votes	%
Jose Rañola	Aksyon	25,413	8.26
John Bongat	Lakas–NUCD–UMDP	25,036	8.14
Cecilia De Asis	Aksyon	24,440	7.95
Gabriel Bordado Jr.	Lakas–NUCD–UMDP	22,946	7.46
Lourdes Asence	Lakas–NUCD–UMDP	21,782	7.08
William Kalaw	Aksyon	20,322	6.61
William Del Rosario	Aksyon	20,263	6.59
Mila Raquid-Arroyo	Aksyon	19,904	6.47
Simeon Adan	Aksyon	19,125	6.22
Jose Grageda	Aksyon	18,817	6.12
Jojo Villafuerte	LDP	17,204	5.59
Benjamin Lucena Jr.	Independent	13,685	4.45
Raoul Rosales	Independent	9,131	2.97
Ulysses Botor	LDP	7,586	2.47
Luis Ortega	LDP	6,615	2.15
Alexander Bichara	LDP	5,897	1.92
Francis Jake Fortaleza	LDP	5,400	1.76
Bernadita Anciano	LDP	5,103	1.66
Ramon Perez	LDP	5,007	1.63
Olver Coronado	LDP	4,474	1.45
Eladio Ignacio Imperial	LDP	4,071	1.32
Elmer Enciso	LDP	3,529	1.15
Jesus Gueriba	Independent	830	0.27
Crisanta Salvador	Partido Isang Bansa, Isang Diwa	216	0.07
Ana Corita Bres	Partido Isang Bansa, Isang Diwa	211	0.07
Gloria Hallare	Partido Isang Bansa, Isang Diwa	186	0.06
Josephine Sarcon	Partido Isang Bansa, Isang Diwa	150	0.05
Hilario Millares	Partido Isang Bansa, Isang Diwa	129	0.04
William Otordos	Partido Isang Bansa, Isang Diwa	116	0.04
Total		307,588	100.00

Ex officio members:

- Julian C. Lavadia Jr. – President, Liga ng mga Barangay
- Yelanie G. Regmalos-Bautista – SK Federation President (until July 31, 2002)
- Allen L. Reodanga – SK Federation President (from August 1, 2002)
