= Luis Agregado Ortega =

Luis Agregado Ortega is a politician from Naga City in the province of Camarines Sur, Philippines.

== Early life ==
Ortega was born in Via Gainza Street in the city of Naga, Camarines Sur on October 9, 1937. He was the second child of Proctoso Bragais Ortega, local politician and Emilia Ayin Agregado.

== Political career ==
Ortega was introduced to politics by his father at the age of 17 when they campaigned for then secretary of national defense Ramon Magsaysay. in the presidential elections of 1953. He first ran as Chairman of the Barangay Council of San Felipe, in the city of Naga on 1982 and won the elections. In 1985, he ran as Councilor in the City Council of Naga, Camarines Sur and also won. He ran for re-election in 1988 as Councilor and again won.

Ortega was an opponent of then Mayor Jesse Robredo. He ran against the mayor thrice in 2010, 2013, and 2016 and lost thrice
