= 1988 Naga, Camarines Sur, local elections =

8th Mayoral elections in the city of Naga, Camarines Sur

- January 18, 1988
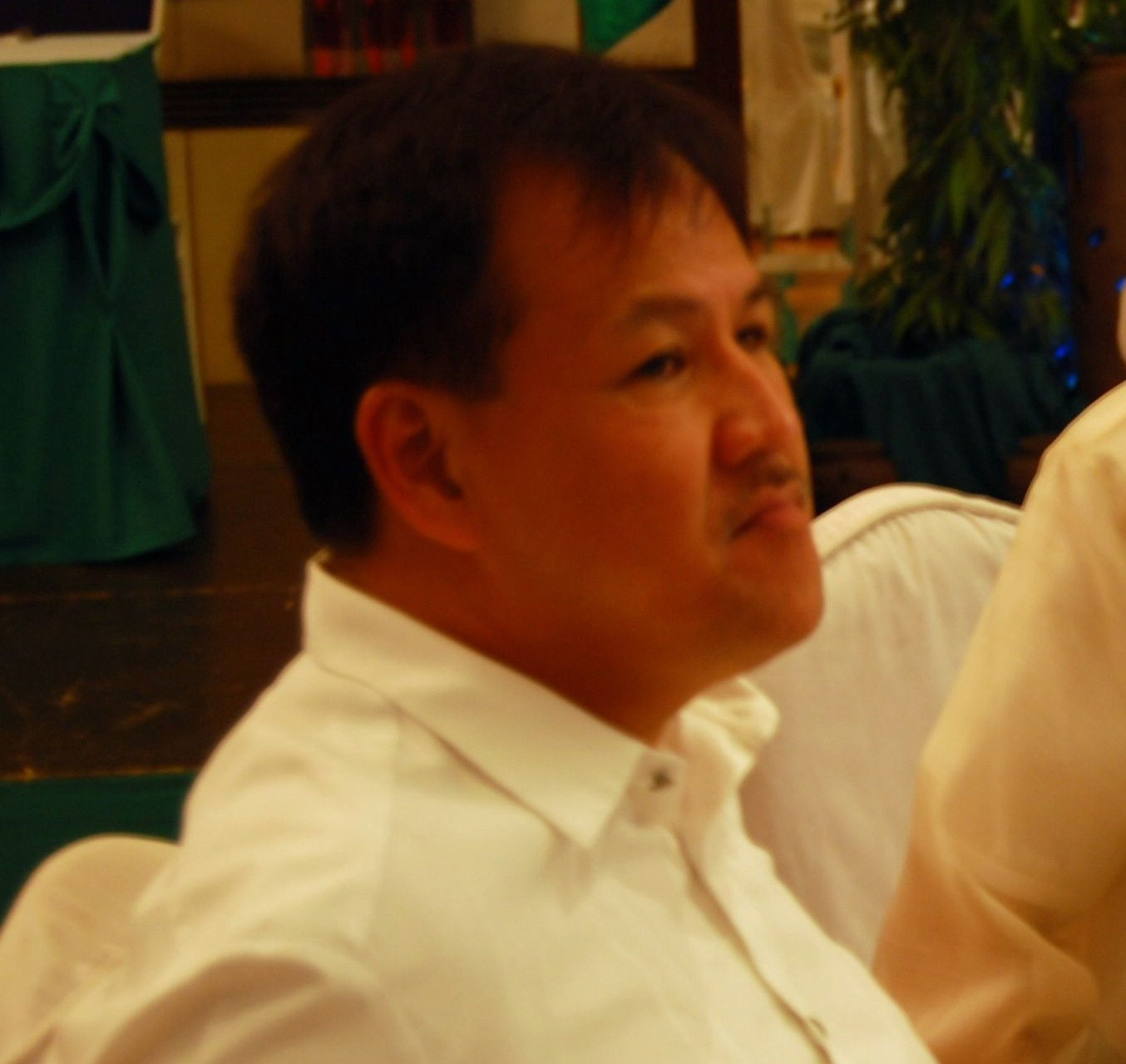

Candidate	Jesse Robredo	Ramon Roco
Party	Lakas	Cory Coalition
Alliance	PDP–Lakas
Running mate	Lourdes V. Asence	Anton Tadeo Dy-Prieto
Popular vote	14,086	13,139
Percentage	36.12%	33.69%
Mayor before election
Carlos del Castillo
UNIDO
Elected mayor
Jesse Robredo
Lakas
- Vice Mayoral election

Candidate	Lourdes V. Asence	Efren G. Santos
Party	Lakas	Independent
Alliance	PDP–Lakas
Popular vote	11,430	10,394
Percentage	69.21%	27.82%
Vice Mayor before election
Romeo Tablizo
Independent
Elected Vice Mayor
Lourdes V. Asence
Lakas

Local elections were held in Naga City, Camarines Sur, on January 18, 1988, as part of the nationwide local elections. Voters elected the mayor, vice mayor, and members of the Sangguniang Panlungsod (city council). These were the first local elections after the 1986 EDSA People Power Revolution and the ratification of the 1987 Constitution.

== Background ==
The 1988 elections marked a major turning point in Naga City politics. The election was the first held under the new democratic system following the downfall of Ferdinand Marcos and the rise of President Corazon Aquino. The former ruling party, Kilusang Bagong Lipunan (KBL), had been discredited, and new coalitions emerged at the local level.

In Naga, long-time political kingmaker Luis Villafuerte backed his nephew, Jesse Robredo, then a young technocrat and director of the Bicol River Basin Development Program. Robredo ran under the newly formed Lakas ng Bansa party. In opposition was the Cory Coalition, led by the brothers of Senator Raul Roco and Representative Ciriaco Alfelor, who sought to challenge Villafuerte's influence. Ramon Roco, Raul’s brother, ran for mayor, while the Liberal Party and other independents also fielded candidates.

Robredo won the mayoralty by a narrow margin, becoming the youngest city mayor in the Philippines at the time. However, his party secured only two out of ten council seats; the rest were won by candidates affiliated with the Cory Coalition. Despite this, Robredo would go on to build a strong reform-oriented administration and was later recognized as one of the most effective local executives in the country.

Vice mayoral candidate Antonio G. Dy-Prieto, a businessman, would later be appointed by President Joseph Estrada as his Presidential Assistant on Bicol Affairs in 1998, a position in which he was alleged to have engaged in sending jueteng money to Chavit Singson.

== Results ==
=== Mayoral election ===
1988 Naga mayoral election
Candidate	Party	Votes	%
Jesse Robredo	Lakas ng Bansa	14,086	36.12
Ramon Roco	Cory Coalition	13,139	33.69
Mariano M. Sibulo	Liberal Party	7,319	18.77
Resitituta M. Imperial	Liberal Party	2,264	5.81
Eduardo S. Rey	Nacionalista Party	1,179	3.02
Virginia Felipe-Perez	Independent	1,012	2.59
Total		38,999	100.00
LnB gain from KBL			
Source: Commission on Elections

=== Vice mayoral election ===
1988 Naga vice mayoral election
Candidate	Party	Votes	%
Lourdes V. Asence	Lakas ng Bansa	11,430	30.60
Efren G. Santos	Independent	10,394	27.82
Antonio G. Dy-Prieto	Cory Coalition	8,693	23.27
Julian Ocampo III	Liberal Party	3,738	10.01
Manuel Berina	Liberal Party	1,329	3.56
Ruben Galang	Independent	892	2.39
Armando Aguja Jr.	Independent	882	2.36
Total		37,358	100.00
LnB gain from KBL			
Source: Commission on Elections

=== City Council election ===
Ten city councilors were elected. The Cory Coalition, which opposed Robredo, secured eight of the ten seats, while only two candidates from the Lakas ng Bansa slate aligned with Robredo were elected. Despite Robredo’s victory as mayor, his administration initially faced a city council dominated by the opposition.

1988 Naga City Council election
Candidate	Party	Votes	%
Jose C. Rañola	Cory Coalition	19,345	10.73
Roberto V. de Asis	Cory Coalition	16,528	9.16
Noe B. Botor	Cory Coalition	14,338	7.95
Erlinda R. Libunao	Cory Coalition	12,996	7.21
Jose L. Grageda	Cory Coalition	12,880	7.14
Rodolfo ZA. Fortuno	Cory Coalition	11,954	6.63
Alfredo A. Cabral Sr.	Lakas ng Bansa	11,591	6.43
Carmen F. del Castillo	Lakas ng Bansa	11,549	6.40
Romeo S. Tayo	Cory Coalition	11,146	6.18
Luis G. Ortega	Cory Coalition	10,455	5.80
Rachel N. General	Independent	9,965	5.52
Cayetano P. Tantua	Independent	9,934	5.51
Eduardo C. Enojado	Independent	9,320	5.17
Rolando L. Bobis	Independent	9,304	5.16
Severiano T. Tacorda	Independent	9,058	5.02
Total		180,363	100.00
Source: Commission on Elections
