= 1992 Naga, Camarines Sur, local elections =

9th Mayoral elections in the city of Naga, Camarines Sur

- May 11, 1992
- Mayoral election
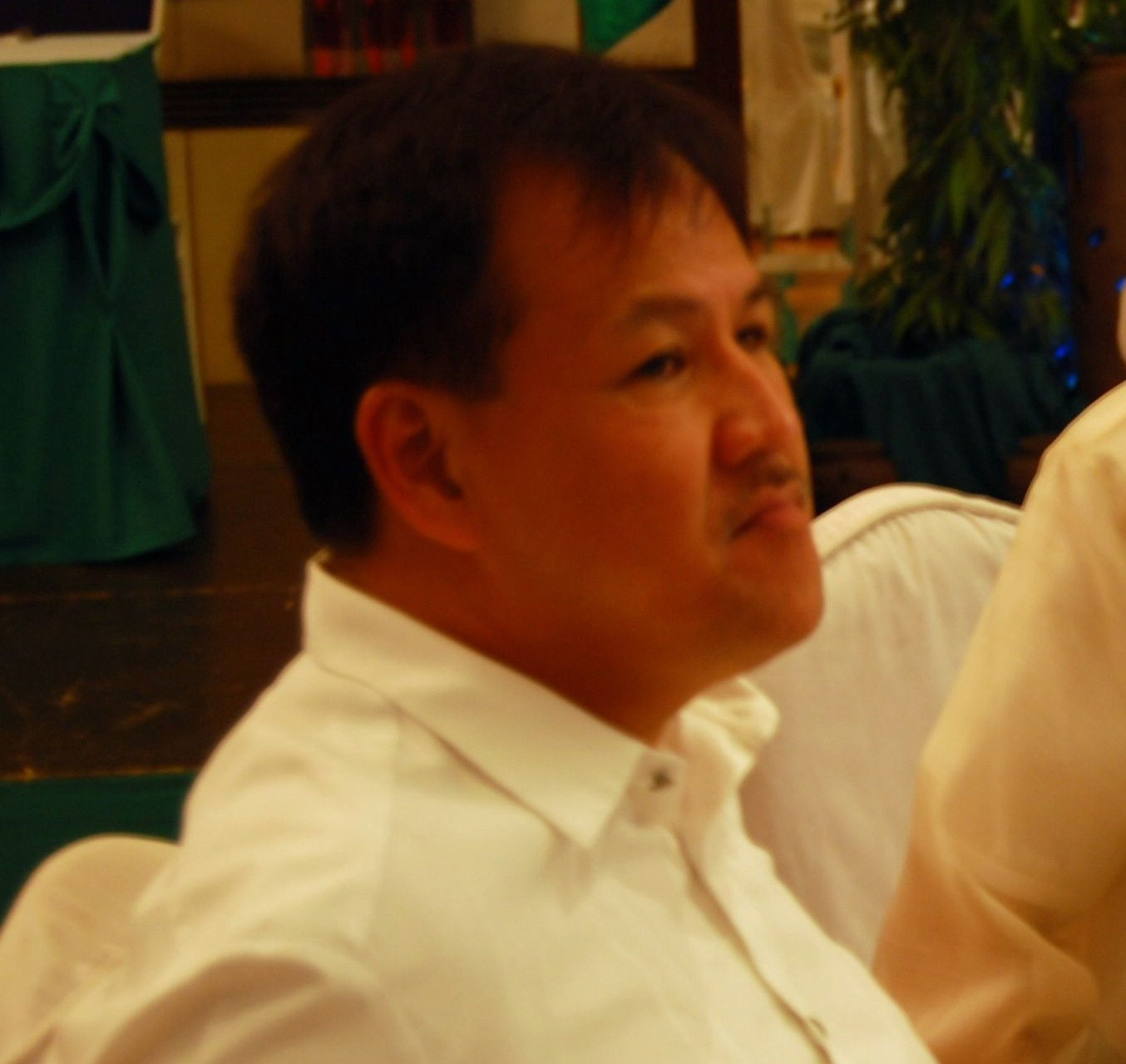

Candidate	Jesse Robredo	Pura Luisa V. Magtuto	Porfirio A. Espeso
Party	Lakas	LDP	KBL
Running mate	Lourdes V. Asence	Jose C. Rañola	Romeo S. B. Escalante
Popular vote	33,487	9,056	51
Percentage	78.62%	21.26	0.12%
Mayor before election
Jesse Robredo
LDP
Elected mayor
Jesse Robredo
Lakas
- Vice Mayoral election
Candidate	Lourdes V. Asence	Jose C. Rañola	Romeo S. B. Escalante
Party	Lakas	LDP	KBL
Popular vote	28,750	12,693	96
Percentage	69.21%	30.56%	0.23%
Vice Mayor before election
Lourdes V. Asence
LDP
Elected Vice Mayor
Lourdes V. Asence
Lakas

The 1992 Naga City local elections were held on May 11, 1992, as part of the 1992 Philippine general election. Voters elected the mayor, vice mayor, and ten councilors. Then-incumbent mayor Jesse Robredo of the newly-formed Lakas–NUCD of administration-endorsed Fidel V. Ramos won re-election in a landslide, sweeping all positions including vice mayor and all ten seats in the city council.

== Background ==
In 1988, Jesse Robredo was elected mayor of Naga City as an independent candidate at the age of 29, becoming one of the youngest local chief executives in the country. During his first term, Robredo introduced governance reforms aimed at increasing transparency, efficiency, and citizen participation, which earned him national recognition and local popularity. His administration was supported by a broad base of civic organizations, professionals, and business groups, forming the groundwork for a reform-oriented political coalition.

By 1992, Robredo aligned himself with the newly formed party Lakas–NUCD ahead of his re-election bid. His administration’s performance in delivering basic services, promoting good governance, and improving public trust helped consolidate political support. Lourdes V. Asence, who also aligned with Lakas, sought re-election as vice mayor.

The opposition, led by candidates from the Laban ng Demokratikong Pilipino (LDP), Robredo's former party affiliation—attempted to challenge his’s reform legacy, but failed to gain traction. Robredo’s coalition swept all major positions in the city, winning the mayoralty, vice mayoralty, and all ten seats in the city council.

== Results ==
=== Mayoral election ===
1992 Naga mayoral election
Candidate	Party	Votes	%
Jesse Robredo	Lakas	33,487	78.62
Pura Luisa V. Magtuto	LDP	9,056	21.26
Porfirio A. Espeso	KBL	51	0.12
Total		42,594	100.00
Lakas hold			
Source: Commission on Elections

=== Vice mayoral election ===
1992 Naga vice mayoral election
Candidate	Party	Votes	%
Lourdes V. Asence	Lakas	28,750	69.21
Jose C. Rañola	LDP	12,693	30.56
Romeo S. B. Escalante	KBL	96	0.23
Total		41,539	100.00
Lakas hold			
Source: Commission on Elections

=== City Council election ===
Ten city councilors were elected. All winning candidates were aligned with the Robredo-led Lakas EDSA-NUCD coalition.

There were twenty-four losing candidates.

1992 Naga City Council election
Candidate	Party	Votes	%
Rodolfo Z. Fortuno	Lakas	25,870	7.78
Esteban R. Abonal	Lakas	24,950	7.50
Fiel L. Rosales	Lakas	22,332	6.72
Jaime S. Jacob	Lakas	22,084	6.64
A. J. Agapito M. Tria II	Lakas	21,994	6.61
Janet B. Soler	Lakas	21,017	6.32
Socorro B. Felix	Lakas	20,436	6.15
Jorge S. de Guzman	Lakas	19,307	5.81
Emilio M. Aguinaldo	Lakas	18,271	5.49
Manuel P. Flores	Lakas	17,720	5.33
Roberto V. de Asis	LDP	13,177	3.96
Noe B. Botor	LDP	10,886	3.27
Erlinda R. Libunao	LDP	10,246	3.08
Victorio A. Aguila	LDP	9,185	2.76
Jose L. Grageda	LDP	8,705	2.62
Romeo S. Tayo	LDP	8,392	2.52
Luis A. Ortega	LDP	7,932	2.39
Gregoria R. Israel	LDP	6,242	1.88
Augusto O. Cledera	LDP	5,962	1.79
Manuel P. Teoxon	KBL	5,366	1.61
Mario O. Joson	LP–PDP	4,707	1.42
Alfredo A. Cabral	LDP	4,514	1.36
Mario Angeles D. Ochoa	Independent	4,028	1.21
Eduardo S. Rey	Nacionalista/NPC	3,575	1.08
Angelo B. Lopo	PnB	3,118	0.94
Ruben V. Velasco	PRP	2,211	0.66
Ferdinand M. Gonzales	KBL	2,171	0.65
Rolando O. Bosquillos	Independent	2,030	0.61
Leoncio M. Clemente	KBL	1,970	0.59
Vicente C. Perdon	Nacionalista/NPC	1,731	0.52
Frank D. Fullante	Nacionalista/NPC	1,379	0.41
Jose T. Brioso	Nacionalista/KBL	623	0.19
Bonifacio C. Dy	KBL	230	0.07
Ernesto F. Cirujano	KBL	189	0.06
Total		332,550	100.00
Source: Commission on Elections
