= Jesse Robredo =

Filipino statesman and politician (1958–2012)

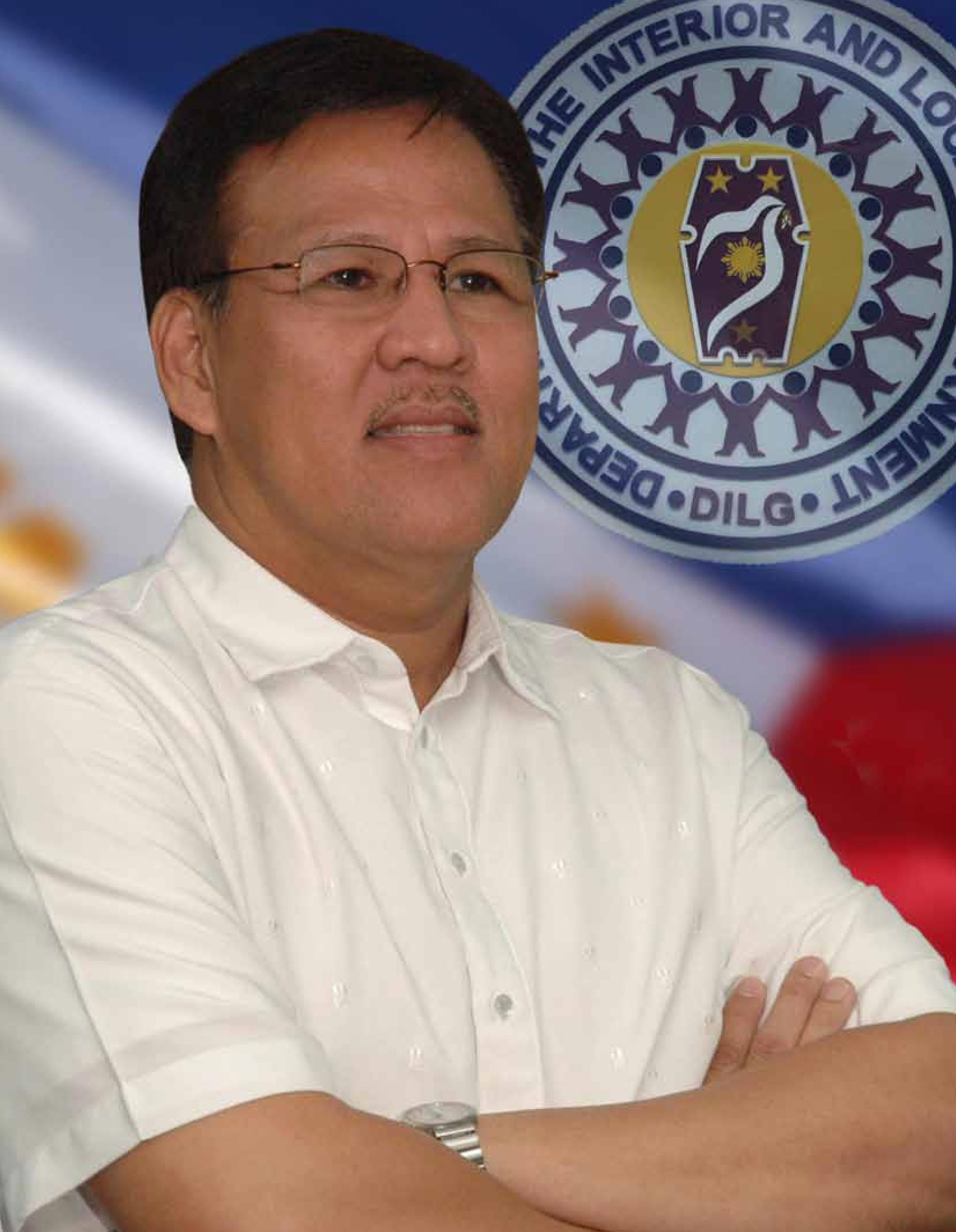
- Official portrait, 2010

23rd Secretary of the Interior and Local Government
- In office July 9, 2010 – August 18, 2012
- President: Benigno S. Aquino III
- Preceded by: Benigno S. Aquino III (Acting in Concurrent Capacity)
- Succeeded by: Paquito Ochoa (Acting)

13th & 15th Mayor of Naga
- In office June 30, 2001 – June 30, 2010
- Vice Mayor: Esteban Abonal Jr. (2001–2004); Gabriel Bordado (2004–2010)
- Preceded by: Sulpicio Roco
- Succeeded by: John Bongat
- In office February 2, 1988 – June 30, 1998
- Vice Mayor: Lourdes Asence
- Preceded by: Carlos Del Castillo
- Succeeded by: Sulpicio Roco

Personal details
- Born: Jesus Manalastas Robredo; May 27, 1958 Naga, Camarines Sur, Philippines
- Died: August 18, 2012 (aged 54) Masbate Island, Philippines
- Cause of death: Airplane crash
- Resting place: Eternal Gardens Memorial Park, Naga, Camarines Sur
- Party: Liberal (2001–2012)
- Other political affiliations: Aksyon (1998–2001); Lakas (1991–1998, 2001); LDP (1988–1991); LnB (1988)
- Spouse: Leni Gerona (m. 1987)
- Children: 3, including Tricia
- Relatives: Butch Robredo (brother)
- Education: De La Salle University (BS); Harvard University (MPA); University of the Philippines, Diliman (MBA)

Jesus "Jesse" Manalastas Robredo QSC CCLH (Tagalog: [ˈdʒɛsi ɾɔˈbɾɛdɔ]; Chinese: 林炳智; pinyin: Lín Bǐngzhì; Pe̍h-ōe-jī: Lîm Péng-tì; May 27, 1958 – August 18, 2012) was a Filipino politician who served as 23rd Secretary of the Interior and Local Government in the administration of President Benigno Aquino III from 2010 until his death in 2012. Robredo was a member of the Liberal Party.

Beginning in 1988, Robredo served six terms as Mayor of Naga in Camarines Sur. In recognition of his achievements as Naga mayor, Robredo was awarded the Ramon Magsaysay Award for Government Service in 2000, the first Filipino mayor so honored. He was appointed to the Cabinet of President Aquino in July 2010.

Robredo died on August 18, 2012, when the light aircraft he was traveling in crashed off the coast of Masbate after suffering an engine failure.

== Early life and education ==
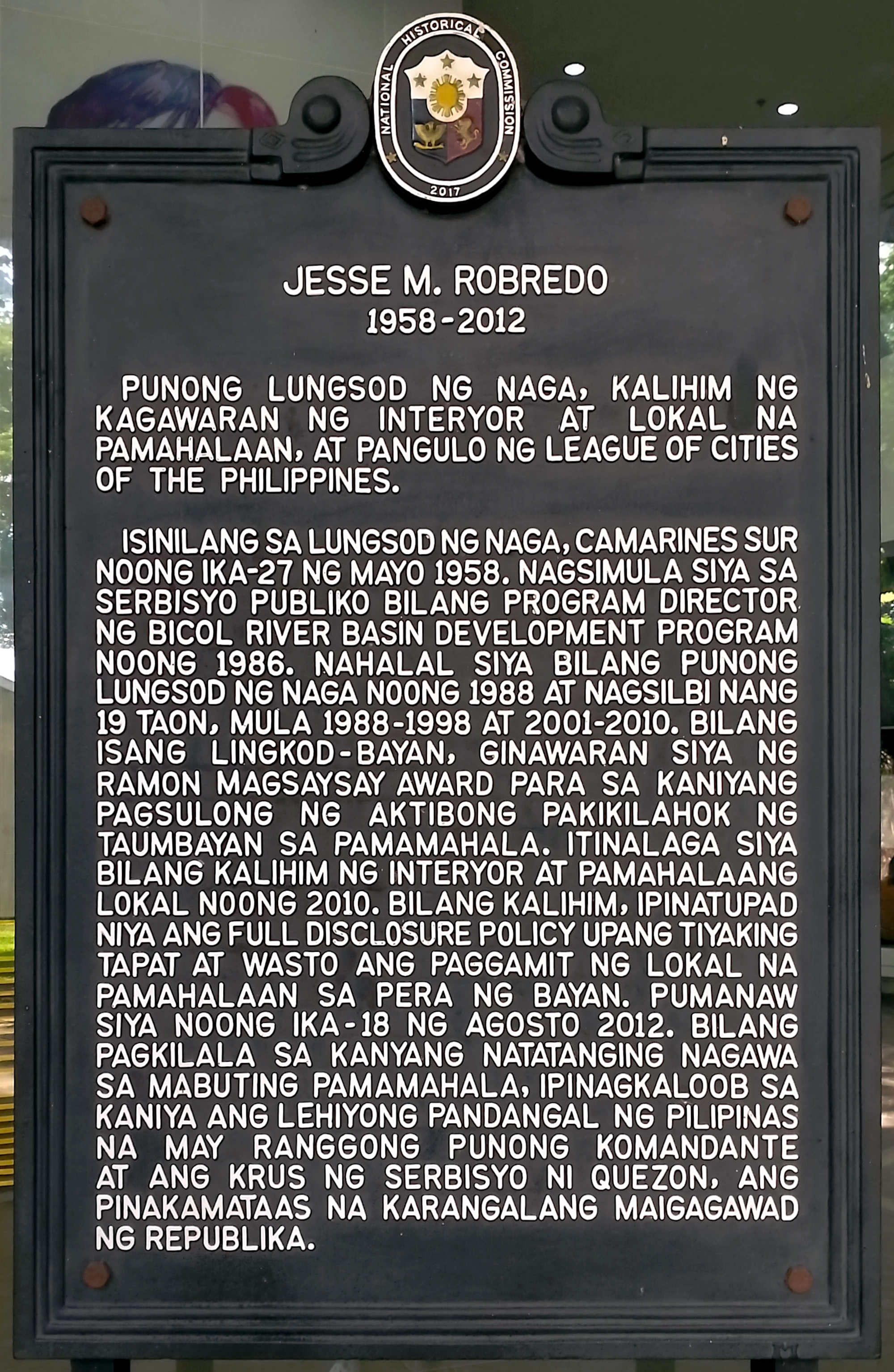
National historical marker unveiled at his museum in Naga

Jesse Manalastas Robredo was born on May 27, 1958, in Naga to José Chan Robredo Sr. and Marcelina Manalastas-Robredo. Jesse is of Chinese descent through his paternal grandfather, Lim Pay Co, who immigrated to the Philippines from Fujian province at the beginning of the 20th century and adopted the surname of the priest who baptized him, thus becoming Juan Lim Robredo. Jesse's Hokkien Chinese name is Lim Pieng Ti. He has one brother and three sisters.

Robredo finished elementary at the Naga Parochial School and entered high school at the Ateneo de Naga University in 1970. Robredo obtained his undergraduate degrees in Industrial Management Engineering and Mechanical Engineering at De La Salle University. In 1985, Robredo finished his Masters in Business Administration at the University of the Philippines, Diliman as a scholar and was named the Graduate School and Faculty Organization awardee for scholarly excellence. He was later accepted as an Edward Mason Fellow and graduated with a Master of Public Administration degree from Harvard University's John F. Kennedy School of Government in 1999. The Far Eastern University bestowed Robredo with a Doctorate in Humanities, honoris causa, during its 80th commencement exercise on April 4, 2008, in recognition of his efforts to develop Naga.

== Political career ==
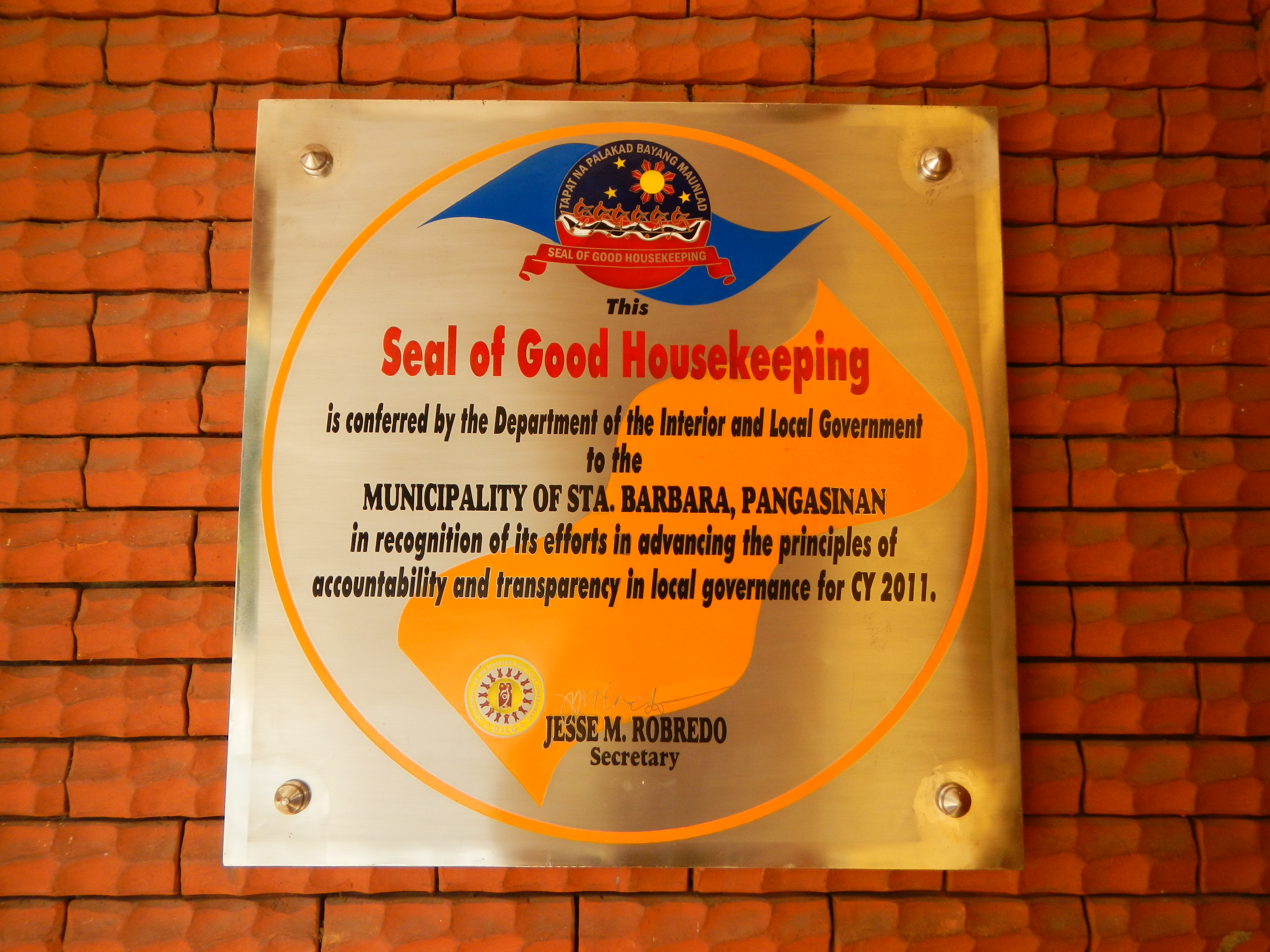
A plaque awarded by Robredo in 2011 as Secretary of the Department of the Interior and Local Government

In 1986, Robredo returned to Naga, where he became program director of the Bicol River Basin Development Program (BRBDP), an agency tasked to undertake integrated area development planning in the three provinces of the Bicol region. While working at the BRBDP, he met fellow Nagueño Leni Gerona, whom he would marry the following year.

In the 1988 Philippine local elections, Robredo was elected mayor of Naga at age 29, making him the youngest person who was elected mayor in the vote. His entry to politics was influenced by his uncle, then-Camarines Sur governor Luis Villafuerte. However, the two fell out in 1992 following allegations of corruption and jueteng involving the Villafuertes, which led to Villafuerte disowning Robredo. In 1995, Robredo was elected president of the League of Cities of the Philippines and chaired the Metro Naga Development Council." His three terms as mayor ended on June 30, 1998, and was succeeded by Robredo's endorsed candidate Sulpicio S. Roco, Jr. In 1999, Asiaweek Magazine credited Robredo with transforming Naga into one of the "Most Improved" cities in Asia.

He re-elected as city mayor in 2001 and again served for three consecutive terms until June 30, 2010. He served for a total of 19 years as mayor of Naga before being appointed as secretary of the Department of the Interior and Local Government on July 9, 2010.

Robredo's appointment was met with political opposition. Luis Villafurte and another Bicolano politician, Luis Agregado Ortega, expressed opposition to Robredo's confirmation by the Commission on Appointments of which Villafuerte himself was a member. In March 2012, the Commission on Appointments bypassed Robredo's nomination. His nomination was bypassed again in June 2012. Another confirmation hearing had reportedly been set on August 29, 2012, eleven days after Robredo's death.

During his time as the secretary of DILG, Robredo focused on relocating thousands of residents in Manila's slums into housing projects to clear Metro Manila's waterways and make way for flood mitigation projects and other development. As head of an inter-agency body for relocation, Robredo pushed for the building of in-city tenement housing units for thousands of informal settler families living in identified "danger zones" such as estuaries, riverbanks, waterways, railroad tracks, garbage dumps and similar areas. These contrasted with earlier government housing efforts, which relocated informal settlers to areas away from the city which deprived residents from their usual livelihoods.

Robredo's opposition to forced evictions were met with resistance from some local government officials, notably Makati mayor Junjun Binay, who argued that such arrangements broke long-standing agreements with private land owners and undermined the city government's authority.

== Death and legacy ==
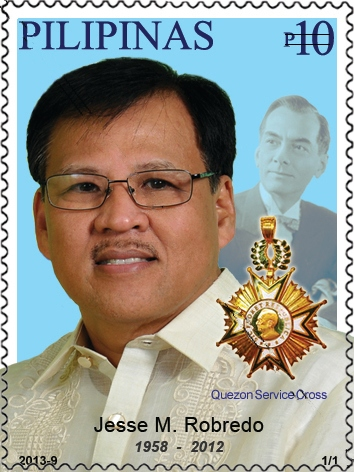
Robredo on a 2013 stamp of the Philippines

Museo ni Jesse Robredo, a museum dedicated to Robredo

Robredo died on August 18, 2012, when the Piper PA-34 Seneca light aircraft he was traveling in crashed off the coast of Masbate Island. He was flying to Naga to assist in his daughter's swimming competition. The plane suffered an engine failure en route from Cebu City, and was attempting an emergency landing at Masbate Airport. Robredo's aide, Police Chief Inspector June Paolo Abrazado, was also on board but survived. Robredo's body was found on August 21, 800 meters (2,600 feet) from the shore and 54 meters (177 feet) below sea level.

His lying-in-repose was at the Archbishop's Palace in Naga before his remains were transferred to Malacañang Palace for his lying-in-state and official rites on August 24, 2012. His remains were then returned to Naga for a state funeral with full military honours at the Peñafrancia Basilica, and subsequent cremation at Naga Imperial Crematory and Columbary. Robredo's ashes are entombed at the Eternal Gardens Memorial Park in Naga.

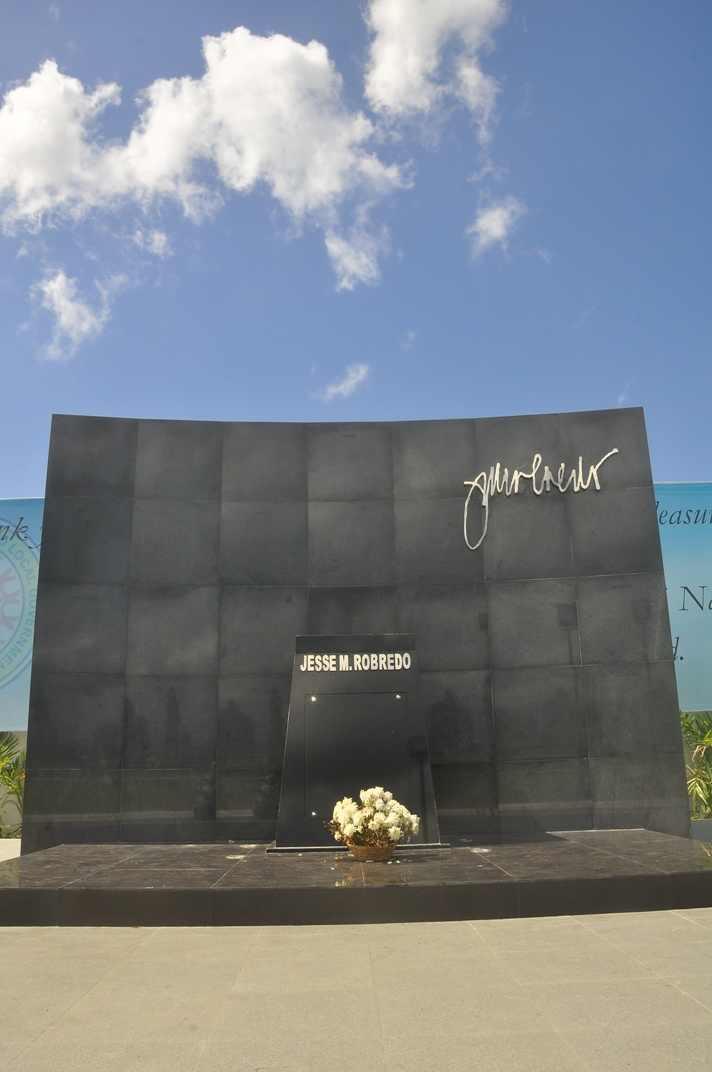
Robredo's tomb at the Eternal Gardens Memorial Park (Naga City).

Following Robredo's death, August 18 was declared "Jesse Robredo Day". President Benigno Aquino III conferred the Philippine Legion of Honor with the rank of Chief Commander upon Robredo on August 28, 2012, just before the state funeral. In addition, two roads were named in his honor, Sec. Jesse Robredo Avenue in Naga and Jesse M. Robredo Boulevard in Masbate City. The Naga City Coliseum was renamed into the Jesse Robredo Coliseum, and the Naga City Governance Institute to the Jesse M. Robredo Good Governance Center. In 2016, a major diversion road in Koronadal City was named as J.M. Robredo Avenue that was witnessed by his daughter, Tricia. In 2017, the Museo ni Jesse Robredo opened in commemoration of his fifth death anniversary.

His alma mater, De La Salle University, renamed the La Salle Institute of Governance into the Jesse M. Robredo Institute of Governance.

== Personal life ==
Robredo married pro bono lawyer and future congresswoman and vice president Leni Gerona on June 27, 1987. They had three daughters named: Jessica Marie "Aika", Janine Patricia "Tricia", and Jillian Therese.

== Electoral history ==
Electoral history of Jesse Robredo
Year	Office	Party	Votes received				Result
Year	Office	Party	Total	%	P.	Swing	Result
1988	Mayor of Naga City	LnB	14,086	36.12%	1st	—N/a	Won
1992	Mayor of Naga City	Lakas-NUCD	33,487	78.62%	1st	+42.50	Won
1995	Mayor of Naga City	Lakas-NUCD	38,408	78.62%	1st	+18.29	Won
2001	Mayor of Naga City	Liberal	-	-	1st	-	Won
2004	Mayor of Naga City	Liberal	-	-	1st	-	Won
2007	Mayor of Naga City	Liberal	37,549	76.30%	1st	-	Won

== Honors ==
National Honors

- : Quezon Service Cross - posthumous (2012)
- : Philippine Legion of Honor, Chief Commander - posthumous (2012)

== Awards ==
- Philippines Exemplary Fiscal Management Award by the DILG, 1989
- Dangal ng Bayan Award by the Civil Service Commission, 1990
- The Outstanding Young Men of the Philippines, 1991
- Ten Outstanding Young Persons of the World, 1996
- Konrad Adenauer Medal of Excellence, 1996
- Ramon Magsaysay Award for Government Service, 2000
- Presidential Lingkod Bayan Award (posthumous) by the Civil Service Commission, 2012

Political offices
Preceded by Carlos Del Castillo	Mayor of Naga; 1988–1998	Succeeded by Sulpicio Roco
Preceded by Sulpicio Roco	Mayor of Naga; 2001–2010	Succeeded by John Bongat
Preceded by Benigno Aquino III; Acting	Secretary of the Interior and Local Government; 2010–2012	Succeeded by Paquito Ochoa; Acting
