= Gabriel Bordado =

Filipino writer and politician (born 1955)

Gabriel H. Bordado Jr.
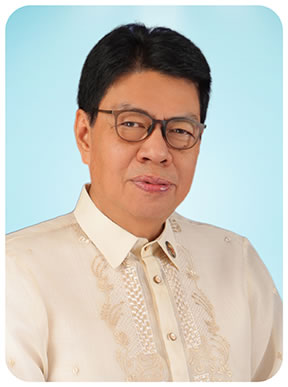
- Official portrait, 2022

Vice Mayor of Naga City
- Incumbent
- Assumed office June 30, 2025
- Mayor: Leni Robredo
- Preceded by: Cecilia De Asis
- In office June 30, 2004 – June 30, 2013
- Mayor: Jesse Robredo (2004–2010); John Bongat (2010–2013)
- Preceded by: Esteban Abonal Jr.
- Succeeded by: Nelson Legacion

Member of the House of Representatives from Camarines Sur's 3rd district
- In office June 30, 2016 – June 30, 2025
- Preceded by: Leni Robredo
- Succeeded by: Nelson Legacion

Member of the Naga City Council
- In office June 30, 2013 – June 30, 2016
- In office June 30, 1995 – June 30, 2004

Personal details
- Born: Gabriel Hidalgo Bordado Jr. February 15, 1955 (age 71) Calabanga, Camarines Sur, Philippines
- Party: Liberal (2001–present)
- Other political affiliations: Aksyon (1998–2001); Lakas (1995–1998, 2001)
- Spouse: Georgina Junsay
- Children: 3
- Education: University of the Philippines Los Baños; University of the Philippines Diliman; National University of Singapore (non-degree courses)
- Occupation: Politician, Writer

Gabriel "Gabby" Hidalgo Bordado Jr. (born February 15, 1955) is a Filipino politician and writer who currently serves as the vice mayor of Naga, Camarines Sur, under mayor Leni Robredo since 2025. He previously held the office from 2004 to 2013, under the mayoralties of Jesse Robredo and John Bongat. He has served as the representative for Camarines Sur's third district from 2016 to 2025 and previously as a member of the Naga City Council from 1995 to 2004 and again from 2013 to 2016.

== Education ==
Gabriel Hidalgo Bordado Jr. pursued his higher education at the University of the Philippines Los Baños, and later at the University of the Philippines Diliman. He also took non-degree short courses at the National University of Singapore.

== Political career ==
Bordado began his political career in 1993 as the Acting City Administrator of Naga City. He was later elected as a member of the Naga City Council, serving from 1995 to 2004 and again from 2013 to 2016. During his tenure as Vice Mayor of Naga City (2004–2013), he worked closely with Mayor Jesse Robredo and later with Mayor John Bongat.

In 2016, Bordado was elected as the Representative for Camarines Sur's 3rd District, a position he held until he was term-limited in 2025. During his time in Congress, Bordado had authored and co-authored numerous bills. He also principally authored major bills enacted into laws, including, among others:

- Republic Act No. 11310: The Pantawid Pamilyang Pilipino Program (4Ps) Act.
- Republic Act No. 11478: Modernization of the Bicol Medical Center, increasing its bed capacity from 500 to 1,000 beds.
- Republic Act No. 12215: Philippine Agriculturist Act of 2025.

Bordado had also been instrumental in addressing the needs of his constituents during the COVID-19 pandemic, implementing programs such as the Tulong Panghanapbuhay sa Ating Disadvantaged/Displaced Workers (TUPAD) and the Bayanihan E-ataman initiative, which provided assistance to COVID-19 patients and their families.

== Literary career ==
Before entering politics, Bordado was an active writer, contributing articles and poems to national newspapers and magazines. His works have been anthologized in books published by the National Commission for Culture and the Arts. In 2014, he published his first book, Tilling Fields, under the Ateneo De Naga Press.

== Awards and recognition ==
In 2020, Bordado received the Distinguished Alumnus Award for Good Governance and Public Service from the UP College of Public Affairs and Development Alumni Association.

== Recent activities ==
In December 2024, Bordado endorsed the third impeachment complaint against Vice President Sara Duterte, citing her alleged misuse of confidential funds and betrayal of public trust.

== Personal life ==
Bordado is married to Georgina Junsay, the first female president of the Central Bicol State University of Agriculture (CBSUA). They have three children.

Political offices
Preceded by Esteban Abonal	Vice Mayor of Naga, Camarines Sur; 2004–2013	Succeeded by Nelson Legacion
House of Representatives of the Philippines
Preceded by Leni Robredo	Member of the House of Representatives from Camarines Sur's 3rd district 2016–present	Incumbent
