= List of charities in the Philippines =

This is a list of charities in the Philippines.

- CharityPhilippines.org
- Angat Buhay Foundation (formally Angat Pinas, Inc.)
- Bantay Bata 163
- Children's Shelter of Cebu
- NGITI Association
- Fairplay For All Foundation
- Gawad Kalinga
- GMA Kapuso Foundation
- Kapwa Ko Mahal Ko
- SM Foundation
- Maharlika Charity Foundation
- Roots of Health
- Third World Movement Against the Exploitation of Women
- Visayan Forum
- Anawim Lay Missions Foundation
- Reception and Study Center for Children (RSCC)
- The Haven for the Elderly (formerly Golden Acres)
- UNICEF Philippines
- Philippines World Vision
- Dream Big Pilipinas
- Health of the Mind PH
- A Million Voices
