= Maharlika (disambiguation) =

Maharlika is the warrior feudal class of the ancient Tagalog society in Luzon.

Maharlika may also refer to:

== People ==
- Claire Contreras, a prominent Filipino political vlogger

== Places ==
- Maharlika Livelihood Center, shopping center in Baguio
- Maharlika Village, a barangay of Taguig
- Maharlika, a barangay of Quezon City

== Sports ==
- Maharlika Pilipinas Basketball League, a professional basketball league
- Maharlika Pilipinas Volleyball Association, a semi-professional volleyball league
- Maharlika Manila F.C., a football club

== Other ==
- Maharlika Charity Foundation, an organization based in Davao City
- Maharlika Investment Fund, a sovereign wealth fund
- Maharlika Nation, self-proclaimed nation based in Socorro, Surigao del Norte
- Maharlika (film), 1987 Philippine war film
