= Socorro Bayanihan Services =

Filipino civic organization

- Socorro Bayanihan Services, Inc.
- Logo of SBSI
- Abbreviation: SBSI
- Established: December 20, 1980; 45 years ago (Note: As per Securities and Exchange Commission registration. The organization is said to have been organized prior to the 1970s)
- Founder: Albino and Rosalina Taruc
- Founded at: Socorro
- Type: Civic organization
- Legal status: People's organization (Note: As per registration. A people's organization (PO) is a group of people, which may be an association, cooperative, federation, or other legal entity, established by the community to undertake collective action to address community concerns and need, and mutually share the benefits from the endeavor.)
- Purpose: Community building
- Headquarters: Sitio Kapihan, Bucas Grande
- Location: Socorro, Surigao del Norte, Philippines
- Coordinates: 9°39′58.4″N 125°58′31.7″E
- Members: 3,650 (2023)

Socorro Bayanihan Services, Inc. (SBSI) is a civic organization based in Socorro, Surigao del Norte, Philippines.

== History ==
Socorro Bayanihan Services, Inc. (SBSI) was formally established by Don Albino Taruc and his wife Rosalina Lasala "Nena" Taruc on December 20, 1980, as per its Securities and Exchange Commission registration. However, SBSI had been organized sometime before the 1970s by Taruc as patriarch and a small group of natives and people from nearby islands.

The civic organization was initially led by Albino Taruc with Rosalina taking over after his death. The couple promoted the concept of bayanihan or communal unity within the organization.

In 2004, SBSI secured a Protected Area Community-Based Resource Management Agreement (PACBRMA) with the Department of Environment and Natural Resources (DENR) for the development of land at Sitio Kapihan in Bucas Grande Island.

People began to settle at Sitio Kapihan sometime around 2017. In 2019, several members of the group would move en masse after a magnitude 5.8 earthquake.

Rosalinda Taruc died on June 27, 2021, and was succeeded by Jey Rence B. Quilario, also known as Senior Agila.

For much of its history, not much was known about SBSI to outsiders until allegations of abuse were made against the organization in September 2023 in the Senate of the Philippines.

The DENR suspended the PACBRMA of the SBSI in October 2023. Pending a relocation program for Sitio Kapihan and a final decision from the DENR, residents would remain as of March 2024. After the detention of Senior Agila, the SBSI under Officer-in-Charge Johan C. Lasala would reintegrate to mainstream society, participating in activities at the Socorro town center.

== Background ==
=== Civic work ===
The Socorro Bayanihan Services is formally a civic organization. It describes itself as a people's organization which exercises bayanihan. Among the services provided by the group are housing, agriculture, and burial services.

=== Religious beliefs, activities, and cult label ===
SBSI has been characterized as a cult, a label which the group rejects. The cult allegations date back as early as 2019.

One group which considers SBSI as a cult is the Movement Against Cults (Kalihukan Batok Kulto), which has ex-members among its ranks.

According to findings from the September 2023 hearings, SBSI allegedly considers its leader Senior Agila or Jey Rence Quilario as a reincarnation of the Santo Niño.

The earthquake in Surigao del Norte was allegedly used by the SBSI to encourage the 2019 mass exodus to Kapihan as part of a doomsday prediction. The Russian invasion of Ukraine was likewise reportedly cited that the doomsday is fast approaching and that members should remain at Kapihan.

During the onset of the COVID-19 pandemic, Quilario prohibited members from getting vaccinated.

==== Marriages ====
Senior Agila allegedly forcibly arranged marriages for female SBSI members, including minors. If a man was not able to consummate his marriage with his bride after three days, Quilario would supposedly "authorize" the man to rape his spouse. He would allegedly threaten members who disobey damnation to hell. Members of the LGBT community, particularly gay men and lesbians, were reportedly forced into heterosexual marriages. Persons with disabilities were also allegedly forcibly married.

=== Political involvement ===
SBSI members were allegedly coerced to vote for Quilario's preferred candidates in the 2022 general elections according to an anonymous information obtained by Rappler. They supported the successful Bongbong Marcos–Sara Duterte campaign as well as local candidates under the UniTeam slate. Their bet for the Socorro mayorship Felizardo Galanida lost to Reza Timcang.

=== Alleged militia ===
The group is alleged to be maintaining a private army, known as the Soldiers of God. The group denies it, insisting that its members alleged to be part of this group to be civic group volunteers training for search and rescue operations.

Then-Surigao del Norte governor Francisco Matugas ordered the creation of a task force to look into allegations in late 2019 after videos on social media showed members apparently conducting military training exercise as well as reports of people leaving work and school to join the group. The same allegations resurfaced in September 2023 in the Senate.

== Relations with religious groups ==
The group says that their members are part of the Philippine Independent Church. This was however disputed by the account of the church who says that SBSI members, who used to be parishioners of their church, had a mass exodus from their congregation in 2019. Their offer to hold mass and final rites for the deceased at Sitio Kapihan has been repeatedly denied.

The Roman Catholic Church views the SBSI's alleged belief that Senior Agila is the reincarnation of the Santo Niño, as an insult to the infant Jesus.

== Sitio Kapihan ==
Sitio Kapihan
- Informal settlement
- Etymology: Place for cultivating coffee
- Interactive map of Sitio Kapihan
- Country: Philippines
- Province: Surigao del Norte
- Municipality: Socorro
- Barangay: Sering
- SBSI signing of PACBARMA with the DENR: 2004 (Note: Protected Area Community-Based Resource Management Agreement (PACBARMA) between the Department of Environment and Natural Resources and the SBSI on June 15, 2004. The agreement was issued on August 31, 2004.)
- Mass exodus to Kapihan: 2019
- Suspension of PACBARMA: September 2023
- Cancellation of PACBARMA: April 4, 2024

Area
  - Total: 353 ha (870 acres)

Population (2023)
  - Total: 3,350
  - Density: 949/km^{2} (2,460/sq mi)
- Managing entity: Socorro Bayanihan Services

The Socorro Bayanihan Services maintains a mountain community named Sitio Kapihan at Barangay Sering in Bucas Grande Island of Socorro, Surigao del Norte. It also hosts the residence of its leader. The name of the site is a reference to it being a former coffee cultivation place.

Sitio Kapihan is situated on a 353 hectares (870 acres) plot of land owned by the government which was leased to the SBSI by the Department of Environment and Natural Resources–Protected Area Management Board (DENR–PAMB) under a 25-year lease for agriculture farming purposes. The DENR would suspend the associated lease agreement in light of allegations against the group which arose in September 2023. Some members would return to their previous homes in response.

The SBSI formerly maintained a tourist site at Kapihan, the Kapihan Nature and Adventure Park which had a zipline installed in 2013.

=== PACBARMA termination ===
On April 4, 2024, the Department of Environment and Natural Resources's Toni Yulo-Loyzaga canceled its June, 2004 – 25 years Protected Area Community-Based Resource Management Agreement No. 74007 with SBSI, over land grant violations in Surigao del Norte (a 353-hectare land in the Siargao Island Protected Landscape and Seascape). “Today, we serve the closure order to SBSI,” she stated. The cancellation order mandated the affected 1,425 households to “self-demolish their houses and to harvest their crops within a reasonable amount of time.”

== Leadership ==
=== Current ===
==== Senior Agila ====
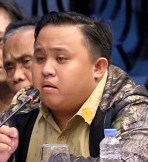
Senior Agila

Jey Rence Quilario (born November 10, 2000) is the current president of the SBSI. According to the SBSI, Senior Agila is a "screen name" used by Quilario who they characterize as a composer and a member of the Filipino Society of Composers, Authors and Publishers. As part of claims of the group being a religious group, Senior Agila is reportedly a reincarnation of the Santo Nino. The SBSI has denied holding such belief about their leader.

He was endorsed by Rosalina Taruc to succeed her role as the group's leader. Quilario would assume the role as SBSI president after Taruc died on June 27, 2021, with backing from Mamerto Galanida.

=== Officers-in-Charge ===
Rexson Lubapis reportedly is the interim leader of SBSI as the Officer in Charge (OIC) in October 2023 following the detention of Senior Agila. Johan Lasala would be the OIC by March 2024.

=== Former ===
==== Albino and Rosalina Taruc ====
The organization was founded by Albino Taruc and his wife Rosalina "Nena" Taruc.

==== Mamerto Galanida ====
Mamerto D. Galanida was a three-term municipal mayor of Socorro. He is the vice president of the SBSI under Quilario. He was a Doctor of Education and former superintendent of schools. He was also a former provincial board member of Surigao del Norte. He died on July 13, 2024.

== Performing arts group ==
The Omega de Salonera is a performing arts group connected to the Socorro Bayanihan Services. performed at the 2023 Sinulog festival in Cebu. In that edition, the dancing troupe clinched the grand prize in the Free Interpretation and Street Dancing awards. Their act featured the lead dancer riding a gold mechanical eagle.

== 2023 Senate investigations ==
Socorro Bayanihan Services Senate investigation
- Date: September 28, 2023; November 7, 2023
- Organised by: Senate of the Philippines Joint Committee: Committee on Public Order and Dangerous Drugs; Committee Women, Children, Family Relations and Gender Equality
- Participants: Senate: Ronald dela Rosa; Risa Hontiveros SBSI; Jey Rence Quilario; Mamerto Galanida; Janeth Ajoc; Karren Sanico Socorro LGU and others Riza Timcang (Mayor); Edelito Sangco

In September 2023, Senator Risa Hontiveros, during a privilege speech, alleged that the group is a cult, claiming that they are engaged in forcing minors to get married, sexual violence, and financial extortion. Senator Ronald dela Rosa likewise called for an investigation over the group's alleged operation of a methamphetamine laboratory and maintenance of a private army.

The Department of Social Welfare and Development (DSWD) also launched their own investigation to look into claims that SBSI is collecting money from beneficiaries of the Pantawid Pamilyang Pilipino Program, the government body's cash grant program.

The group's vice president expressed willingness to cooperate with the investigation. He admitted to early marriages happening within the group but denied them being forced upon members. He further denied the other accusations, including that his group was a cult. He attributed the claims to fabrications by former member Edelito Sangco.

=== September 28 hearing ===
On September 28, 2023, a Senate hearing led by Hontiveros and de La Rosa attended by SBSI leaders were held to tackle the cult allegations. SBSI President Quilario, Vice President Galanida and members Janeth Ajoc and Karren Sanico were cited for contempt during the hearings for their responses in queries regarding if child marriages are occurring within the group.

The Commission on Human Rights would confirm the allegations of child marriages and human rights violations based on their initial findings.

=== October visit ===
Senator Dela Rosa conducted an inspection at Sitio Kapihan on October 14, 2023. He was accompanied by staff members of the offices of his colleagues Koko Pimentel and Risa Hontiveros

Dela Rosa is convinced that SBSI is a cult, having observed the members' reverence to Senior Agila. He believes that the members gave rehearsed answers during their investigation. He however admits that they have not found any evidence of the SBSI maintaining a private army or a methamphetamine laboratory.

Dela Rosa also directed the National Bureau of Investigation to look into a mass grave by the SBSI after finding out that most of those buried were children.

=== November 7 hearing ===
The plan to hold a second hearing at Sitio Kapihan did not push through. The hearing was still held at the Senate on November 7. Among the topics discussed were:

- Alleged torture of a senior citizen ex-member by the Soldiers of God militia. He was accused of using black magic.
- A teenage girl who testified under the alias Chloe, says she was locked in a room by SBSI official Janeth Ajoc with a 21-year-old man who raped her. She was 13 years old at the time.
- The circumstances of the unrecorded deaths of babies at Sitio Kapihan.

The contempt charges filed against the SBSI members laid last two months were lifted so that the arrest warrant against them could be served.

== Legal case ==
Legal charges have been filed against 13 SBSI officials, including Quilario.

The Department of Justice (DOJ) on September 22, 2023, announced they would be handling the legal case filed against the SBSI in June 2023. The case was originally filed at the Provincial Prosecutors Office in Surigao del Norte but the prosecutors inhibited due to threats to their lives. The case was transferred to Manila. The preliminary investigation by the DOJ was finished within the month.

=== Other cases ===
Five lawsuits filed against SBSI members has been dismissed. These

The Municipal Circuit Trial Court (MCTC) of Dapa-Socorro Surigao del Norte dismissed the following due to lack of jurisdiction two cases filed in 2019:

- Revised Penal Code violation for usurpation of authority
- Illegal use of uniform/insignia

A case filed in 2021 was dismissed due to lack of probable cause.

- Alarm and Scandal

Two other cases were dismissed at a prosecutor's level.

== See also ==
- Maharlika Nation
- Jonestown
