= Senior Agila =

President of the Socorro Bayanihan Services

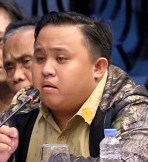
- Senior Agila in 2023
- Born: Jey Rence B. Quilario; November 10, 2000 (age 25); Socorro, Surigao del Norte, Philippines
- Other name: Senior Agila
- Known for: President of the Socorro Bayanihan Services
- Musical career
- Occupations: Composer, singer, songwriter, producer
- Instruments: guitar; drum
- Label: ALT Entertainment
- Dancing career
- Current group: Omega de Salonera

Jey Rence B. Quilario (born November 10, 2000), more commonly known by his alias Senior Agila, is the president of the Socorro Bayanihan Services group.

He garnered wider public attention in September 2023 when the group under his leadership faced allegations of sexual abuse and being a cult.

== Early life and education ==
Quilario was born on November 10, 2000, in Barangay Nueva Estrella, in the town of Socorro, Surigao del Norte province. His father, Romel Quilario, was a farmer, and his mother, Gengie, was a teacher. As an only child, Quilario's family were active members of the Philippine Independent Church (IFI).

He attended Socorro National High School, where he was a member of the dance troupe and often performed at events. Known for being a jokester with many friends and high grades, he dropped out of high school after his family moved to Sitio Kapihan. He completed only two years of high school education.

According to the official clarificatory statement from the IFI leadership in Socorro, Quilario was once an altar server who did not show a remarkable record of performance and instead demonstrated some "dubious actions."

== Career ==
=== Socorro Bayanihan Services ===
In 2017, Quilario became part of Socorro Bayanihan Services, Inc. (SBSI), a civic organization in his hometown. In 2019, he convinced the group's members to move to Bucas Grande Island, still within the same town, to settle in Sitio Kapihan after an earthquake.

In December 2019, Quilario was endorsed by Rosalina Taruc, the founder of Socorro Bayanihan Services (SBSI) and his former teacher at Socorro High, to become the president of the group. He was said to have been hesitant to accept the role due to his young age.

After Taruc died on June 27, 2021, Quilario formally became president of SBSI.

==== Divinity claims and teachings ====
According to former SBSI members, there have been claims of divinity involving Quilario. The group, initially a civic organization, is said to have morphed into a religious group or "cult" under his leadership.

Ex-members alleged that Quilario claimed to be God, specifically the Santo Nino and a Messiah. Not complying with his orders was said to mean damnation in hell. He was also said to have the ability to stop rain and make birds sing on command. SBSI has denied these claims.

=== Art and news career ===
Quilario is a composer, and SBSI states that "Senior Agila" is his screen name as a musician. The group claims that he is a member of the Filipino Society of Composers, Authors and Publishers (FILSCAP). FILSCAP confirms that they have a member with the same name but cannot verify that Quilario is that person. He can play various instruments, including the guitar and drums.

He leads the Omega de Salonera performing arts group, which is linked to SBSI.

Quilario became the chief executive officer of ALT Entertainment, which operates ALT FM 105.5, a radio station located at SBSI's Sitio Kapihan. He wrote and produced songs for ALT himself. One of his songs is "Arikingking," a love song. Another is "Sinag ng Pasko," a Christmas-themed station ID for ALT, which was credited to Quilario.

== Legal case ==
In September 2023, SBSI under his leadership was alleged to be a cult, a characterization rejected by the group. SBSI faced allegations of forced marriages and sexual abuse involving minors. Underage members were allegedly coerced into marrying and having sex with adult partners under the pretense that such actions were required by a "rule to go to heaven." During a public Senate hearing, an alleged former member claimed that young women who broke this rule were branded "adios" and subjected to cruel punishment, such as being locked in a foxhole or assaulted with a paddle.

Criminal charges of qualified trafficking, kidnapping, and serious illegal detention were filed against 13 SBSI members, including Quilario himself.

Quilario denied these claims. He is alleged to have forcibly arranged marriages for women, including minors, and to have coercively solicited sexual favors.

He attended a Senate hearing on September 28, 2023, to address the allegations. Quilario and three of his fellow members were cited for contempt by the Senate Committee on Public Order and Dangerous Drugs, which believed they were lying in their responses to the forced child marriage allegations. He and other members of SBSI are currently detained in Senate quarters until the case is resolved. The cases are still be heard as of February 2026.

== See also ==
- List of people claimed to be Jesus
