= DKF (disambiguation) =

DKF may refer to:

- Det Konservative Folkeparti, a centre-right political party in Denmark
- Dalaw Kalinga Foundation, a charity in the Philippines
- Dansk Komponist Forening, a professional community for professional composers and sound artists in Denmark
- Danske Kvinders Forsvarsforening, a Danish women's organization
- Dansk Kommunalarbejder Forbunds, a trade union representing local government workers in Denmark
- Donkey Kong Forum, the leading online community for discussing the 1981 Donkey Kong arcade game
