= Neoserica denticulata =

Scientific classification
- Kingdom: Animalia
- Phylum: Arthropoda
- Clade: Pancrustacea
- Class: Insecta
- Order: Coleoptera
- Suborder: Polyphaga
- Infraorder: Scarabaeiformia
- Family: Scarabaeidae
- Genus: Neoserica
- Species: N. denticulata

Binomial name
- Neoserica denticulata Moser, 1922

Species of beetle

Neoserica denticulata is a species of beetle of the family Scarabaeidae. It is found in the Philippines (Bucas Grande).

== Description ==
Adults reach a length of about 9 mm. They are very similar to Neoserica uncinata.
