= Soledad Perpiñan =

Filipina Roman Catholic nun

Personal life
- Born: Mary Soledad Perpiñan; 1937
- Died: 2011 (aged 73–74)
- Occupation: Nun, educator, writer, human rights activist, ecofeminist

Religious life
- Religion: Roman Catholicism
- Order: Congregation of Our Lady of Charity of the Good Shepherd

Mary Soledad Perpiñan, RGS, (1937–2011) commonly known as "Sister Sol", was a Filipina educator, writer, human rights activist, ecofeminist, Roman Catholic nun, and member of the Religious of the Good Shepherd. She is best known for her years of resistance to martial law under Ferdinand Marcos, for co-founding, editing, and writing for IBON Facts and Figures (which later became IBON Foundation) in 1978, for founding the Third World Movement Against the Exploitation of Women in 1980, for founding the non-governmental organization and research group BALAI (sometimes called BALAI Fellowship) in 1981, and for her extensive writing and lecturing on the topics of peace, development, human rights, and the Third World feminist perspective.

== See also ==
- Mary Christine Tan
- IBON Foundation
