= Mogens Winkel Holm =

Danish composer

Mogens Winkel Holm (1 October 1936 – 31 October 1999) was a Danish composer.

Holm was born in Copenhagen; his father was the architect Tyge Holm. He studied orchestration with Jørgen Jersild at the Royal Danish Academy of Music and oboe with Mogens Steen Andreassen, then for some years was assistant oboist with the Royal Danish Orchestra and worked in the music department at Danmarks Radio. From 1965 to 1971, he was also the music reviewer for Politiken and Ekstra Bladet. He also held a number of posts in music organisations, including president of Det Unge Tonekunstnerselskab (The Society of Young Musicians) and for almost 20 years, of Dansk Komponist Forening (the Danish Composers' Association). In 1999 he was elected to membership of the Royal Swedish Academy of Music.

Holm was a prolific composer in a wide range of genres, but ballet was his speciality. In collaboration with, among others, his brother the dancer and choreographer Eske Holm, he originated a long series of ballets, both at the Royal Danish Theater and on Danish and Swedish television between 1964 and 1984. His music has been described as dramatic and often very gestural. Paradoxically enough, it is experienced as a record of improvisation. At the same time, it is constructed on a framework, in a pre-established format. "The framework protects me from being completely absorbed by the material, but it also protects the material from being absorbed by me," the composer himself said. But he also said: "You see with your ears, you hear with your eyes. A spring day, a vision, a sound: A lark singing high in the dazzling sky, a dot. Hold on! If you look away for just a moment, you will never find it again."

== Compositions (incomplete list) ==
- Op. 3 string quartet (1958)
- Op. 5 chamber concerto (wind quintet - 1958)
- Chamber Concerto (bassoon, string quartet and string orchestra - 1959)
- Abracadabra (piccolo, trumpet, cello and timpani - 1960)
- Momento a ballata (string quartet No. 2 - 1960)
- Kleine Hotel Suite (oboe, bassoon and horn - 1961)
- op. 12 Concerto piccolo (orchestra - 1961)
- St. Annaland (puppet show for television - 1962)
- Composition for soloist, choir and school orchestra (1963)
- op. 13 Aslak (chamber opera in three scenes - 1963)
- op. 14 Tropismer (Tropisms) (ballet - 1963)
- op. 17 choral fragment
- op. 19 Brev til stilheden (Letter to silence) (1964)
- Cumulus (strings - 1965)
- op. 25 sonata (wind quintet - 1965)
- op. 26 Ricercare (oboe and orchestra - 1966)
- Oktobermorgen (October morning) (choir - 1966)
- Kontradans (Contradance) (ballet - 1967)
- op. 29 Sonata for 4 operasangere (Sonata for 4 opera singers) (opera - 1968)
- Cradle song (voice and guitar - 1968)
- op. 31 Fordi jeg er ensom (Because I'm lonely) (soprano and chamber ensemble - 1969)
- Galgarien (Orchestra 1970)
- Overtoninger (Overtones) (1971)
- Annonce (Advertisement) (for television -1971)
- Transitions II (flute, cello and piano - 1973)
- Musik for 2 lurer (Music for 2 lurs) (1974)
- Tarantel (Tarantella) (1975)
- Feens slott for 6 lige stemmer (The fairy's castle for 6 equal voices) (1975)
- Aarhus (choir - 1975)
- Med næb og kløer (Tooth and nail) (dance - 1977)
- Tarantel (Tarantella) (ballet - 1977)
- Eurydike Tøver (Eurydice hesitates) (ballet - 1977)
- Gærdesanger under kunstig stjernehimmel (Lesser whitethroat under artificial starry sky) (cello and orchestra - 1980)
- Aiolos (Symphony in one movement - 1980)
- Til Blåskæg (To Bluebeard) (ballet - 1981)
- Adieu (flute, violin, cello, vibraphone and harp - 1982)
- Note-book (oboe, bassoon and clarinet - 1983)
- Cries (orchestra - 1984)
- Wie kann man den Gesang unserer Waldfögel verschönern? Concerto for 10 ensembles (How can the singing of our woodland birds be beautified?) (1984)
- Fiat Lux (Day 1 of Anders Suneson's Hexaëmeron) (soloists, choir and orchestra - 1985)
- Hellig tre konger (Three kings) (soprano and lute - 1985)
- Zwei Stimmen für einen cellospielenden Sänger (Two voices for a singer playing the cello) (1985)
- Scars (harpsichord and piano - 1985)
- Aeneas alene (Aeneas alone) (electric guitar - 1986)
- 7 Breve til Stilheden (7 letters to silence) (chamber ensemble - 1976/87)
- Prison Music III: To Eros (3 sopranos, 3 oboes and harp - 1987)
- Piping Down (flute - 1988)
- Syster, min Syster (Sister, my sister) (soprano and orchestra - 1989)
- Prison Music IV: The King's Sorrow (3 sopranos, 3 oboes and harp - 1989)
- Aria (wind quintet - 1990)
- 4 songs (Shakespeare's Twelfth Night; soprano and guitar - 1992)
- Troglodyte (Troglodytes) (accordion - 1994)
- Prison Music IIIb (3 sopranos, 3 oboes and harp - 1996)
- Glasbjerget (The glass mountain) (organ and orchestra - 1998)

== See also ==
- List of Danish composers

== Sources ==
- Mogens Winkel Holm (1936–1999), Samfundet til Udgivelse af Dansk Musik
- About Holm's operas (in Danish)
- Erland Rasmussen, "Højt at flyve vidt at skue", Dansk Musik Tidsskrift 66 (1991–92) 38–44 (in Danish)
- Sven Erik Werner, "Omkring Mogens Winkel Holms sonate for fire operasangere", Dansk Musik Tidsskrift 43 (1968) 63–66 (in Danish)
- Mogens Winkel Holm, "Balletopskrift" (Eurydice Tøver), Dansk Musik Tidsskrift 52 (1977–78) 106–07 (in Danish)
- Svend Aaquist Johansen, "Mellem lammeskyer og lidenskab—Mogens Winkel Holm, bogholder", Dansk Musik Tidsskrift 57 (1982–83) 171–74 (in Danish)
