= Million Voices (disambiguation) =

"Million Voices" is a 2012 song by Swedish DJ Otto Knows.

Million Voices or A Million Voices may also refer to:

== Songs ==
- "Million Voices", a song by Wyclef Jean from the soundtrack of the 2004 film Hotel Rwanda
- "Million Voices", a song by Armin van Buuren from the 2019 album Balance
- "A Million Voices" (song), Russia's entry in the Eurovision Song Contest 2015, performed by Polina Gagarina

== Other ==
- A Million Voices (charity), a charity organisation based in Arendal, Norway, but operating in Manila, Philippines

== See also ==
- Million Voices Against Corruption, President Chen Must Go, a Taiwanese protest movement
