= Maharlika Nation =

- Flag containing the Maharlika Nation seal
- Type: Self-proclaimed tribal nation within the Philippines
- Headquarters: Isla Bucas Grande
- Location: Socorro, Surigao del Norte, Philippines
- Coordinates: 9°39′50.7″N 125°56′40.9″E
- Services: Cash aid via self-produced currency (G-Zion)

Maharlika Nation is an organization based in Socorro, Surigao del Norte, Philippines. They claim to represent the "Maharlikan people" and operates within the jurisdiction and laws of the Philippines.

They are noted for releasing its own currency, the G-Zion, which is not recognized as legal tender by the Bangko Sentral ng Pilipinas, the central bank of the Philippines, or by any other government.

== Background ==
The Maharlika Nation is based on an island of Bucas Grande in Socorro, Surigao del Norte. It claims to represent an indigenous group known as the "Maharlikan people".

In the 1950s, the current Maharlika Nation was part of the Bucas Grande Farmer's Association. The farmer's association splintered off to the Maharlika Nation and the Socorro Bayanihan Services by 1972.

In early 2020, the Maharlika Nation received public attention when people around different parts of the country came to its islands to receive cash gifts in the form of its own currency, the G-Zion. The beneficiaries were allegedly promised that the currency could be exchangeable to gold bars once it was funded. It was also alleged that there was also a membership fee. The Maharlika Nation has denied claims that it is coercing people to pay a membership fee and branded such allegations as slander. The local government of Socorro says it will file a case for fraud against the Maharlika Nation for distribution currency that has no value.

After the nearby Socorro Bayanihan Services was probed by the Senate for allegations of abuse in 2023, the Maharlika Nation was also subjected for investigation regarding their Protected Area Community-based Resource Management Agreement (PACBARMA) with the Department of Environment and Natural Resources. Maharlika Nation insists that they are compliant with national laws and regulations.

== Currency ==
The Maharlika Nation produces and recognize the G Zion as its currency and legal tender. G-Zion stands for "Golden Zion". As of January 2020, the nation claims the value of one G-Zion is equivalent to 200 Philippine peso. The Bangko Sentral ng Pilipinas, the Philippines' central bank, does not recognize the G-Zion as a legal tender. The currency is produced and distribution by the Maharlika Nation's International Tribal Bank. Its denomination ranges from 1 G-Zion to 100,000 G-Zion.

== Beliefs and practices ==
The Maharlika Nation professed belief in Jesus Christ and Bathala. They advocate for a simple and natural life, prohibiting its members from consuming alcohol, cigarettes, and illegal drugs. They prohibit jewelry, shorts, makeup, colored hair and tattoos for its members. Women members specifically are compelled to wear skirts and are barred from wearing what it deems as "sexy clothing".

== Status ==
=== Indigenous people recognition ===
The Maharlika Nation is a registered entity under the Philippine government's Securities and Exchange Commission. According to the Socorro Mayor Felizardo Galameda, the group had unsuccessfully attempted to get registered as a people's organization.

The Maharlika Nation claims itself to be self-governing under the IPRA law. However the National Commission on Indigenous Peoples release a statement that it does not recognize an ancestral domain by an IP community in the town of Socorro where the Maharlika Nation is based. The NCIP says that as per its own research, there is no evidence that the Maharlikans of the Maharlika Nation constitute an ethnolinguistic groups.

The Maharlika Nation says that the NCIP is discriminating against it, insisting that the NCIP does not understand the traditions of the Maharlikans.

=== Claim as a tribal nation ===
The Maharlika Nation has claimed to be an independent nation within the Republic of the Philippines claiming article 37 of the Indigenous Peoples' Rights Act of 1997 (Republic Act No. 8371) and the United Nations Declaration on the Rights of Indigenous Peoples as basis for its establishment.

The Maharlika Nation reportedly claims territory in the whole Southeast Asia, and not just the Philippines. Its stated goals is to promote the dignity of the "Maharlika people", the rights of indigenous peoples, and the banning of religion to unite its people under one faith. It designates "New Jerusalem" as its capital.

The NCIP points out that the group has its own self-proclaimed government while at the same time has been seeking help from the national Philippine government.

In October 2023, the Maharlika Nation says that it does not seek to secede from the Philippines, and has expressed support for President Bongbong Marcos.

=== Campaign to rename the Philippines ===
The Maharlika Nation has advocated for the renaming of the Philippines to "Maharlika" which was an initiative of former President Ferdinand Marcos Sr. They hoped President Bongbong Marcos would pursue this endeavour.

== See also ==
- Socorro Bayanihan Services
- Kingdom Filipina Hacienda
- Tallano gold
