= Nueva Estrella =

Nueva Estrella may refer to the following places in the Philippines:

- Nueva Estrella, Cagdianao, barangay in the municipality of Cagdianao, province of Dinagat Islands
- Nueva Estrella, barangay in the municipality of Bien Unido, province of Bohol
- Nueva Estrella, barangay in the municipality of Socorro, Surigao del Norte
