= SBSI =

SBSI may refer to:

- SBS independent, film and television production company, linked to Special Broadcasting Service public broadcasting network, Australia
- Confederation of Indonesia Prosperous Trade Union (Serikat Buruh Sejahtera Indonesia), a trade union federation from Indonesia
- SBSI – Surface Based Body Shape Index. A new method to replace Body mass index.
- Socorro Bayanihan Services, Inc., a civic organization in Socorro, Surigao del Norte, Philippines
