= Elias Mordal =

Filipino footballer (born 1998)

Personal information
- Full name: Elias Edison Mordal
- Birth name: Edison Suerti
- Date of birth: 20 January 1998 (age 28)
- Place of birth: Cotabato City, Philippines
- Position: Right back

Youth career
- Træff
- Molde

Senior career*
Years	Team	Apps	(Gls)
2018–2019	Molde II	0	(0)
2018	→ Sunndal (loan)	0	(0)
2019	Brattvåg	9	(0)
2020	Azkals Development Team	0	(0)

International career^{‡}
2017	Norway U19	2	(0)
2019	Philippines U22 Olympic	4	(0)
- * Club domestic league appearances and goals as of 05:36, 17 January 2021 (UTC) ‡ National team caps and goals as of 16:15, 10 December 2019 (UTC)

Elias Edison Mordal (born 20 January 1998), also known by his birth name Edison Suerti, is a Filipino former professional footballer who played as a right back.

Born in the Philippines and raised in Norway, he has played for Norwegian clubs Molde, Sunndal, and Brattvåg, as well as for the Norway under-19 team. He represented his country of birth at under-22 level in the 2019 Southeast Asian Games.

== Early life ==
Mordal was born in Cotabato City, Philippines as Edison Suerti. His biological mother placed him at the Children's Shelter of Cebu, an orphanage in Cebu City. When he was 18 months old, Norwegian musicians Jens and Lena Mordal adopted him and renamed him Elias Edison Mordal. He was then raised in Molde, Norway with two adoptive siblings.

His adoptive father, Jens, is passionate about football and introduced the young Elias to the sport. When he was five, Jens took him to local club Træff. He later joined the youth team of Molde Fotballklubb.

== Club career ==
=== Molde II ===
He was promoted to Molde II, the B-team of his club.

==== Loan to Sunndal ====
In September 2018, Mordal joined 3. divisjon club Sunndal on a 3-month loan.

=== Brattvåg ===
In January 2019, Mordal joined 2. divisjon club Brattvåg. He made his debut for Brattvåg in a 4–2 away defeat to Byåsen.

=== Azkals Development Team ===
In March 2020, Mordal was listed in the squad of the Azkals Development Team in the Philippines Football League. However, when the league season began in October, he was not a player of the team.

=== Retirement ===
In January 2021, through an Instagram post, he announced his retirement from football at the age of 22. He cited "a lack of spark, lack of belief and lack of motivation" and that he "didn't feel the happiness anymore" in football.

== International career ==
=== Norway U-19 ===
In January 2017, Mordal was called up for the Norway U-19, he made his full debut in a 2–1 win against Ireland U-19.

=== Philippines U-22 Olympic ===
Mordal was part of the Philippines U-22 Olympic squad that competed in the 2019 Southeast Asian Games held in Philippines.

=== Philippines ===
In March 2019, it was reported that Mordal received an invitation to train with the Philippines national team. He received his first call up for the Philippines in June 2019 for a friendly against China, but eventually did not take part due to eligibility constraints. He made his unofficial debut for the Philippines in a scoreless friendly draw with Guangzhou Evergrande. Clearance is being secured to resolve his eligibility issues that would enable him to make his first official appearance for the Philippines.
