= Neoserica makilingica =

Scientific classification
- Kingdom: Animalia
- Phylum: Arthropoda
- Clade: Pancrustacea
- Class: Insecta
- Order: Coleoptera
- Suborder: Polyphaga
- Infraorder: Scarabaeiformia
- Family: Scarabaeidae
- Genus: Neoserica
- Species: N. makilingica

Binomial name
- Neoserica makilingica Moser, 1915

Species of beetle

Neoserica makilingica is a species of beetle of the family Scarabaeidae. It is found in the Philippines (Luzon).

== Description ==
Adults reach a length of about 10 mm. They are coloured exactly like Neoserica uncinata, with very thick tomentum. The frons is finely punctate and has some setae next to the eyes. The antennae are reddish-brown. Due to the dense tomentum covering, the punctation on the pronotum is barely visible. The sides of the pronotum are setate. The elytra have rows of punctures, with the spaces between these shallow and extensively covered with tiny bristled punctures.
