= IBON Foundation =

Philippine nonprofit organization

- Formation: 1978; 48 years ago
- Founder: Sister Mary Soledad Perpiñan
- Type: Nonprofit organization
- Purpose: Social, economic and policy research
- Affiliations: Makabayan
- Website: ibon.org

The IBON Foundation is a non-profit research, education and information-development institution with programs in research, education and advocacy based in the Philippines. It provides socioeconomic research and analysis on people's issues to various sectors (primarily grassroots organizations). It aims to contribute to people's empowerment through education and advocacy support. The foundation is also engaged in international solidarity work.

== History ==
=== 2000s ===
IBON further developed its emphasis on people's issues and support for the capacity building of people's organizations in research, education, information and advocacy work.

== Programs and centers ==
There are also community-based people's action research initiatives on production, economic uplift and advocacy. IBON uses participatory methodology in research and attempts to democratize the research process through community-based people's action research. The Databank and Research Center also manages the quarterly IBON Surveys, in which it gathers data on people's economic conditions and opinions about issues.

== Networks ==
IBON is an active participant in a number of networks tackling people's issues in the local and international arenas:

AidWatch Philippines – National network of grassroots-based and -oriented NGOs working on official development assistance (ODA) issues in the country. It aims to bring together and deepen relationships among a wide range of organizations for collaboration among NGOs on aid-related issues and concerns.

Asia Pacific Research Network (APRN) – Established in 1998 as a result of networking among research organizations and NGOs in Asia following conferences in 1997, its objective is to channel and focus NGO research efforts towards supporting information, education and advocacy needs of grassroots organizations.

Better Aid – International network aiming for aid effectiveness

Pagbabago! People's Movement for Change – Broad-based national movement for people to make their voices heard. It fosters “new politics” (government from below); advocates supervision of leadership by the public and encourages leadership support. With claims to being pro-people, pro-Filipino and honest, it calls for a government which relies on the continuing consent and support of the governed rather than coercive means to maintain power.

Our World is Not For Sale (OWINFS) – Worldwide network of organizations, activists and social movements committed to challenging trade and investment agreements which advance the interests of powerful corporations at the expense of people and the environment.

People's Movement on Climate Change (PMCC)—A global campaign which aims to provide a venue for the grassroots (especially from the south, the most affected and least empowered to adapt to climate change) to participate in the process of drawing up a post-2012 climate-change framework.

People's Coalition on Food Sovereignty (PCFS) – Growing network of grassroots groups of small food producers (particularly peasant-farmer organizations and their support NGOs), working towards a People's Convention on Food Sovereignty.

RESIST! – International campaign to draw a broad aggregate of people worldwide who are opposed to neoliberal globalization and war.

The Reality of Aid – North/south international non-governmental collaboration focusing exclusively on analysis and lobbying for poverty-eradication policies and practices on the international-aid front

Water for the People Network – Campaign involving research, education, people's action, legislation and legal struggles, local and international networking, aimed at opposing moves by government, multilateral-funding institutions and large local and multinational corporations to privatize water resources, systems and utilities, making profits at the expense of people
