= Maharlika Livelihood Center =

- Location: Abanao-Zandueta-Chugum-Kayong-Otek, Baguio, Benguet, Philippines
- Coordinates: 16°24′51″N 120°35′42″E
- Opened: 1982
- Developer: MAR-BAY
- Manager: Human Settlements Development Corp.
- Owner: Baguio city government

Maharlika Livelihood Center is a shopping complex in Baguio, Philippines.

== History ==
The center in 2018.

The Maharlika Livelihood Center stands on the former site of the Baguio Stone Market, which was gutted by a major fire in 1970 and was demolished in the mid-1970s. In 1972, the Baguio city council leased the property to MAR-BAY and Co., Inc., which was given the right to build and manage the Maharlika Livelihood Center for 25 years.

The center opened in 1982 under the auspices of First Lady Imelda Marcos as human settlements minister. The establishment is the first shopping mall and livelihood hub in Baguio. Nearby souvenir shops which were displaced by fire moved into the building.

In 1975, the Baguio city council extended the lease period of the Maharlika Livelihood Center to 50 years, with the lease set to expire on April 27, 2025. In 1980, the city council acknowledged the transfer of MAR-BAY's rights to the Maharlika Livelihood Complex to the Human Settlements Development Corporation (HSDC) including additional developments built by MAR-BAY in the property such as the MAR-BAY Baguio Plaza Hotel and MAR-BAY shopping center. The HSDC is an attached agency of the Department of Agriculture (DA). In 2009, President Gloria Macapagal Arroyo issued a directive to the DA to hand over the retail complex to the city government since it does not fulfill any agriculture-related function. However the retail center remained under HSDC by the end of Arroyo's presidency.

The Baguio city council allowed Mayor Benjamin Magalong in 2019 to start negotiations with the HSDC for the return of the Maharlika Livelihood Center to the city government ahead of the scheduled expiration of the lease deal in 2025.
