= Roots of Health =

Nonprofit organization in Palawan, Philippines

Roots of Health (Ugat ng Kalusugan) is a nonprofit organization focused on improving the reproductive, maternal and sexual health of women, girls, and their communities in Puerto Princesa, Palawan in the Philippines. Roots of Health is committed to working towards a vision of the Philippines where everyone is empowered to access sexual and reproductive health services free from stigma and discrimination. The organization's three-pronged strategy focuses on clinical services, education, and system strengthening. Roots of Health aims to encourage self-reliance and independence among women, young people and families in Palawan by providing scientifically accurate information on health, along with age-appropriate educational services to change health attitudes and behaviors. Roots of Health also seeks to reduce the incidence of maternal mortality, HIV and promote the importance of preventing teenage pregnancy to help ensure continued education.

== History ==
Roots of Health was founded in 2009 by Susan Evangelista and her daughter Amina Evangelista Swanepoel. Evangelista, a professor at Palawan State University, was initially concerned about the unplanned pregnancies and lack of reproductive health knowledge among her students. Recognizing this unmet need, the two women worked together to establish an organization focusing on reproductive and women's health, with the larger goal of improving health and quality of life in this impoverished province of the Philippines. Roots of Health began as a modest team in 2009, as three full-time staff members working out of their homes. They provided reproductive health classes at Palawan State University and in one community. Less than a year later, clients started asking for clinical services. Susan and Amina realized that reproductive health knowledge needed to be matched with easily available, high-quality, free services and thus hired their first nurse to begin their approach of coupling education and services.

== Work ==
Women-Oriented Programs

Roots of Health employs a rigorous needs assessment process that involves interviews and surveys in order to select underserved communities in Puerto Princesa that would most benefit from their work. Once the communities are selected, they offer a comprehensive package of programs and services to any and all women and young people in the community who wish to partake, including the following:

- Contraceptive Acceptors Program
- Healthy Pregnancy Program (i.e., free pregnancy testing, provision of prenatal vitamins, medical check-ups)
- Community Health Advocate Program
- Medical Missions

The organization currently has ten active communities in Puerto Princesa City. The missions are conducted to reach poor women in isolated areas of Palawan. Roots of Health have provided services as far as Balabac in the South and Coron in the North.

Youth-Oriented Programs

- Youth Advocate Program
- Reproductive health, puberty and HIV seminars for high school and college students
- Health fairs for college and high schools
- Usapang K (Talk K) radio show and website

Children-Oriented Programs

- Community educational support program (i.e., recreational activities for children whose mothers are participating in the maternal health/financial literacy classes)

Service Delivery

Roots of Health is the only non-government organization in Palawan that provides free reproductive health services. Their clinic is located in Puerto Princesa City and is one of the major ways they provide free, confidential, safe, and accessible clinical reproductive services. Roots of Health's clinic is a key part of how they help improve women’s reproductive health and decrease the number of unplanned pregnancies by providing:

- sexuality health education
- access to modern contraceptives
- family planning counseling
- prenatal check ups
- pap smears
- HIV testing

System Strengthening

Roots of Health has expanded beyond just sexual health education and clinical services to also support and strengthen existing systems for the people of Palawan. This has included partnering with the government, as well as ensuring there is a continuous supply of contraceptive inventory for Palaweños, regardless of their channel of access.

== Media recognition ==
Roots of Health was recently recognized by the Bill and Melinda Gates Foundation's Family Health Division as a headline non-profit for funding on Catapult.org. Their staff and programming have been consistently featured in notable global and national news outlets, including The Guardian.

Swanepoel, the Executive Director, has also been featured in several publications including Celebrity Living, Women’s Health and Cosmopolitan Magazine. She was named a finalist for the Millennium Development Goal of Improving Maternal Health. and previously nominated for an MDG Warrior award by Probe Media Foundation in the Philippines.

== US Board members ==
- David Callan
- Isabel de Bruin Cardoso
- Dr. Susan Evangelista
- Dr. Sabrina Hermosilla
- Suneeta Kaimal
- Keefe Murren
- Elspeth Williams

== PH Board members ==
- Margarita Encarnacion
- Dr. Susan Evangelista
- David Fernandez
- Michelle Ongpin
- Sara Reysio-Cruz
