= Maharlika Charity Foundation =

Maharlika Charity Foundation, Inc. (MCFI) is a Davao, Philippines based charitable organization. The charity is located at the Maharlika Center, at J.P. Cabaguio Avenue, Davao City.

The Maharlika Charity Foundation was founded in May 1973 to provide free surgical services to the poor and the needy. MCFI is a non-stock, non-profit charity foundation.
