= Neoserica uncinata =

Scientific classification
- Kingdom: Animalia
- Phylum: Arthropoda
- Clade: Pancrustacea
- Class: Insecta
- Order: Coleoptera
- Suborder: Polyphaga
- Infraorder: Scarabaeiformia
- Family: Scarabaeidae
- Genus: Neoserica
- Species: N. uncinata

Binomial name
- Neoserica uncinata Brenske, 1899

Species of beetle

Neoserica uncinata is a species of beetle of the family Scarabaeidae. It is found in the Philippines (Luzon).

== Description ==
Adults reach a length of about 10 mm. They have an ovate, dull, dark body. The clypeus is broad, short and densely and slightly wrinkled-punctate. The pronotum is distinctly projecting forward in the middle anteriorly and the posterior angles are broadly rounded. The scutellum is very broad. The elytra are punctate in rows, with the intervals broad, flat, widely spaced and not punctate. The pygidium is less pointed. The underside is less densely tomentose.
