= Third World Movement Against the Exploitation of Women =

Third World Movement Against the Exploitation of Women (TW-MAE-W) started on Human Rights Day, 10 December 1980, led by Sister Mary Soledad Perpinan.

It is directed towards the liberation of women from all kinds of oppression and exploitation based on sex, race or class. In the Philippines, it is engaged in direct services for survivors of incest, rape and the sex trade.

== History ==
By 1981, TW-MAE-W had initiated a number of demonstrations in the Southeast Asian capitals to gain momentum and support. It spearheaded the protest against Japanese sex tours on Human Rights Day, December 10, 1980, its foundation date. The programme really got going after Brother Andrew, head of La Salle University, offered scholarships to learn computer work to a mama san (brothel manager), her daughter and two bar girls. From this small beginning, TW-MAE-W created seven drop-in centres and three homes around the country, run by 35 female staff members. In addition, the Bethany Transition Home in Quezon City, Manila, houses 10-20 women, all of whom have outside jobs.

In 2007, they held an Anti-Human Trafficking workshop.

== Programs and services ==
The programs and services of TW-MAE-W are geared towards the sector of children and women survivors of sexual abuse and exploitation. They offer Drop-In Centers and Growth Homes and Transition Homes to victims.

== Livelihood projects ==
Handbags are made by their women using materials from different sources which are then sold. Other income-generating projects include beekeeping (honey production), candlemaking, catering, and massage.

== Belen drop-in centers ==
The drop in centers have been opened in Pasay, Quezon City, Batangas City, Subic, Cebu City, General Santos, and Angeles City. Here, women and children survivors of the sex slavery trade are befriended and dealt with by trained staff and fieldworkers to avail of programs and services at the center.
