= A Million Voices (charity) =

Charity

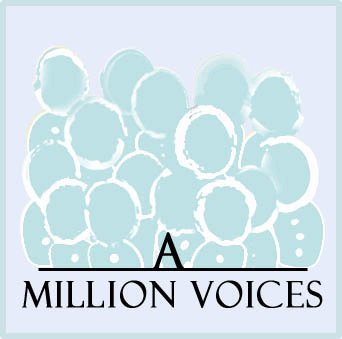
- Type: Non-profit charity organisation
- Headquarters: Arendal, Norway

A Million Voices (AMV) is a non-profit charity organisation based in Arendal, Norway, but operating in Manila, Philippines. The organisation, founded in December 2007 by then 21-year-old student Charlotte Isabel Johansen, is a non-governmental organisation (NGO), and receives no subsidies from any governments or political parties. It is dependent on donations from individuals and businesses, and the help of volunteers for its projects.

== Goals and vision ==
A Million Voices' vision is "Giving a Voice to the Millions Silenced by Poverty". More concise, the organisation focuses on helping children from poor families, or homeless children in Manila. Instead of giving away money, the organisation hands out food, school supplies, clothes, health care and dental care. AMV offers a scholarship program, where donors fund one year of school for a child - which includes everything a child would need for the year. Other projects aims at self-help by teaching people a livelihood, in which they can support their families without relying on charity.

== Collaborators ==
For many of AMVs projects it collaborates with Volunteer Professionals (VP) also situated in Manila. VP provides the AMV beneficiaries with teaching and livelihood training.

At 26 January 2012 A Million Voices signed a Memorandum of Agreement with the Philippine Normal University through the Center for Teaching and Learning (PNU-CTL). This agreement ensure a 3-year collaboration to promote academical growth of the beneficiaries of the foundations projects.

== AMV in the media ==
- In January 2009 Civil Military Operations Battalion wrote an article in their newsletter Balitaan Sa Barangay about AMV where AMV received a plaque of appreciation.
- 28 December 2009, the Norwegian Newspaper Agderposten wrote an article about AMV Christmas party held at 12 December 2009 for 54 children and their families in Manila.
- At 15 June 2011, Agderposten wrote an article about AMVs founder, Charlotte Isabel Johansen, and other AMV volunteers working at the Norwegian music festival Hove Festival to raise money for the projects in Manila.
