= Children's Shelter of Cebu =

The Children's Shelter of Cebu was founded in 1979. The three residences provide shelter and care for 70-80 children.

== History ==
It started out as a vision of a small group of Filipinos and four Americans to build for a ministry to homeless children. They soon purchased a house and obtained licensing from the government. By 1985, the shelter had purchased a second home. Then in 1992, the Schmidt Family Foundation of Canada built two new houses for the ministry. In 1995, the Children's Shelter of Cebu staff started planning for a school. Construction of the school started in October 1997, and the school opened in August 1998. As of 2005, the CSC has cared for 659 orphaned, abandoned, surrendered, neglected and malnourished children in Cebu.

== The Children ==
The Shelter cares for 70-80 children. The children range in age from birth to teenagers. They live in the homes until they are adopted or reunited with their parents. About 20% of the children have special needs, including cerebral palsy, blindness, brain damage and malnutrition. The children come from various backgrounds. Some were abandoned, others surrendered by their birth parent(s), others orphaned, some were found living on the street, while others came from government hospitals where they were abandoned after birth.

== Adoption ==
The Children's Shelter of Cebu works in co-operation with the Philippine government's Department of Social Welfare and Development. Children are placed for adoption through the Philippine government's Department of Social Welfare and Development. The Shelter works to provide supportive services to the families to help them take back their children. If this is not possible, the children are placed for adoption. 60% of CSC's children are adopted into Western nations. If a child is unable to be adopted, CSC eventually moves them to the Wally Johnson Teen Home, where they can attend a school in the city and be prepared for mainstream Filipino life.

== The Staff and Supporters ==
They include social workers, house parents, tutors, child care and household workers, guards, caretakers and office staff. They come from all walks of life.
