= Dansk Komponist Forening =

Dansk Komponistforening (DKF) (the Danish Composers' Association) is a professional community for professional composers and sound artists in Denmark. DKF was founded in 1913 and is the Nordic countries' oldest composers' association. The association is behind the website KomponistBasen which is a web dictionary of Danish composers.
