= Bucas Grande =

Island in Surigao del Norte, Philippines

- Location within Philippines

Geography
- Coordinates: 9°40′25″N 125°56′54″E
- Adjacent to: Dinagat Sound; Philippine Sea
- Area: 128 km^{2} (49 sq mi)

Administration
- Philippines
- Region: Caraga
- Province: Surigao del Norte
- Municipality: Socorro

Demographics
- Population: 25,942 (2020)

Additional information

Bucas Grande is an island in the province of Surigao del Norte in the Philippines. The island is contiguous with the municipality of Socorro, Surigao del Norte. Its area is 128 square kilometres (49 sq mi). Its name means "large mouth" or "large opening" in Philippine Spanish in reference to the wide strait in between Bucas Grande and Socorro Island.

Bucas Grande Island is situated on the far eastern part of mainland Surigao del Norte. The lone island municipality of Socorro is the only one of its kind in the entire province of Surigao del Norte. Bucas Grande Island lies within the breadth of the Pacific and is physically located at coordinates 9° 37′ 17″ North, 125° 58′ 0″ East. It has a total land area of 12,445 hectares and had a population of 25,942 inhabitants at the 2020 Census, and a voting population of over 13,000. People have settled in 14 barangays of the municipality namely: Barangays Don Albino Taruc, Navarro, Rizal, Del Pilar, Dona Helene, Honrado, Nueva Estrella, Pamosaingan, Salog, San Roque, Sudlon, Santa Cruz, Songkoy and N. Sering.

Bucas Grande is also the site of Sohoton Cove, a cluster of small islets with lagoons, natural limestone caves, and rock formations. The name means "narrow opening" in Visayan, referring to the narrow gaps between the small islands. It is commonly mistaken as being a national park, due to the confusion with the similarly named Sohoton Caves and Natural Bridge Park in Samar Island to the north.
