= Socorro, Surigao del Norte =

Municipality in Surigao del Norte, Philippines

Socorro
- Municipality
- Municipality of Socorro
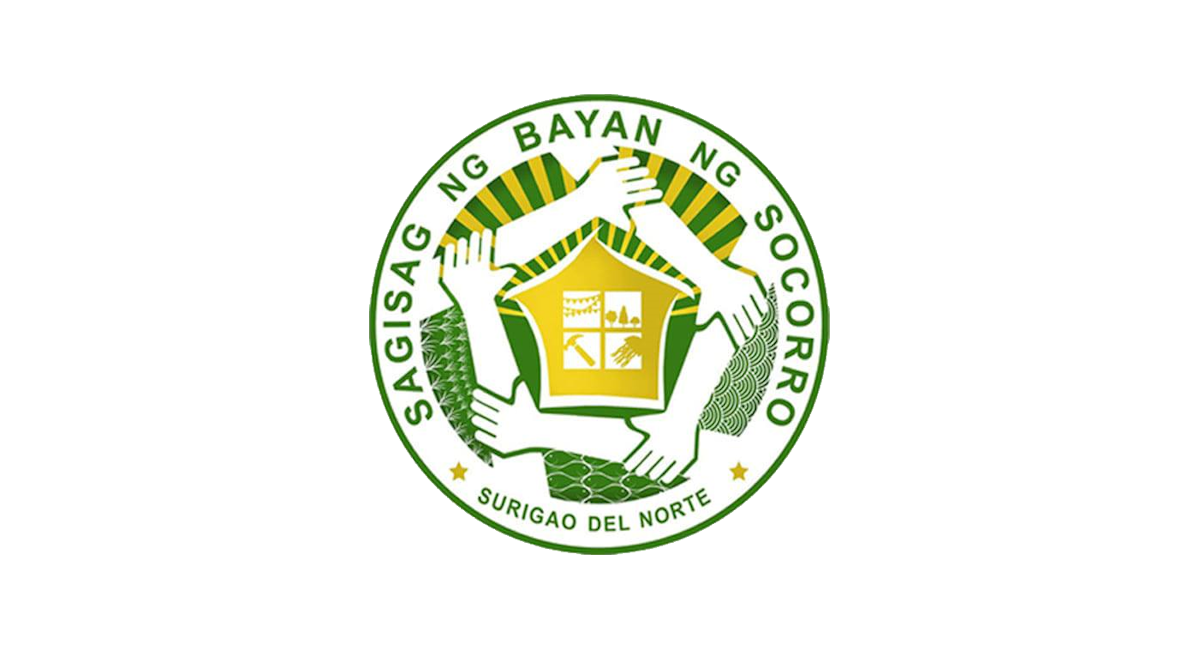
- Flag

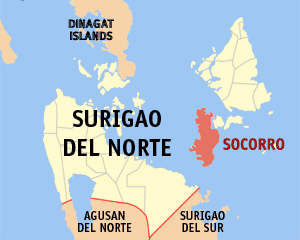
- Map of Surigao del Norte with Socorro highlighted
- Interactive map of Socorro
- Location within the Philippines
- Coordinates: 9°37′05″N 125°57′58″E
- Country: Philippines
- Region: Caraga
- Province: Surigao del Norte
- District: 1st district
- Founded: February 22, 1961
- Barangays: 14 (see Barangays)

Government
  - Type: Sangguniang Bayan
  - Mayor: Riza Rafonselle T. Timcang
  - Vice Mayor: Dalisay G. Canta
  - Representative: Francisco T. Matugas
  - Municipal Council: Members: Markglenn Quirido; Wowie G. Timcang; Alex Guma; Jerald J. Mante; Emerito R. Estrella; Louie M. Liquido; Jelson Bohol; Berting Dacera
  - Electorate: 17,689 voters (Philippine general election, 2025)

Area
  - Total: 114.45 km^{2} (44.19 sq mi)
- Elevation: 27 m (89 ft)
- Highest elevation: 719 m (2,359 ft)
- Lowest elevation: 0 m (0 ft)

Population (2024 census)
  - Total: 28,436
  - Density: 248.46/km^{2} (643.50/sq mi)
  - Households: 5,849

Economy
  - Income class: 3rd municipal income class
  - Poverty incidence: 21.03% (2023)
  - Revenue: ₱ 157.7 million (2024)
  - Assets: ₱ 287.4 million (2024)
  - Expenditure: ₱ 136.5 million (2024)
  - Liabilities: ₱ 96.19 million (2024)

Service provider
  - Electricity: Siargao Electric Cooperative (SIARELCO)
- Time zone: UTC+8 (PST)
- ZIP code: 8516
- PSGC: 1606723000
- IDD : area code: +63 (0)86
- Native languages: Surigaonon; Agusan; Cebuano; Tagalog
- Website: www.socorro.gov.ph

Socorro, officially the Municipality of Socorro (Surigaonon: Lungsod nan Socorro; Tagalog: Bayan ng Socorro), is an island municipality in the province of Surigao del Norte, Philippines. According to the 2024 census, it has a population of 28,436 people.

The municipal territory is contiguous with the island of Bucas Grande. Formerly a sitio and later a barrio in Dapa known as Bunga, it was established as a municipality on February 22, 1961, by virtue of Executive Order No. 219.

== Etymology ==
The municipality's name is derived from Spanish for "help." A popular folklore suggested that the name originated from a Spanish priest's plea for help when his sailboat nearly capsized amid a storm while he was en route to officiate Mass in 1920. Brave local men of the then-sitio rushed to assist, saving the priest and his companions. In gratitude, the priest named the place “Socorro” to honor their courage and willingness to help others in danger.

It was previously named Bunga, which translates to "fruit."

== Geography ==
=== Barangays ===
Socorro is politically subdivided into 14 barangays. Each barangay consists of puroks while some have sitios.

- Don Albino Taruc (Poblacion)
- Del Pilar
- Doña Helene
- Honrado
- Navarro (Poblacion)
- Nueva Estrella
- Pamosaingan (formerly Gardeña and part of Del Carmen)
- Rizal (Poblacion)
- Salog
- San Roque
- Santa Cruz
- Sering
- Songkoy
- Sudlon

=== Climate ===
Climate data for Socorro, Surigao del Norte
Month	Jan	Feb	Mar	Apr	May	Jun	Jul	Aug	Sep	Oct	Nov	Dec	Year
Mean daily maximum °C (°F)	27 (81)	27 (81)	28 (82)	29 (84)	30 (86)	29 (84)	29 (84)	29 (84)	30 (86)	29 (84)	29 (84)	28 (82)	29 (84)
Mean daily minimum °C (°F)	23 (73)	23 (73)	23 (73)	23 (73)	25 (77)	25 (77)	25 (77)	25 (77)	25 (77)	25 (77)	24 (75)	24 (75)	24 (75)
Average precipitation mm (inches)	210 (8.3)	161 (6.3)	123 (4.8)	85 (3.3)	148 (5.8)	186 (7.3)	164 (6.5)	157 (6.2)	141 (5.6)	190 (7.5)	223 (8.8)	200 (7.9)	1,988 (78.3)
Average rainy days	21.0	16.8	18.5	18.2	24.9	27.7	28.4	27.0	26.1	27.6	24.6	22.0	282.8
Source: Meteoblue

== Demographics ==
Socorro is noted for having 75 people's organization in 2023.

Population census of Socorro
Year	Pop.	±% p.a.
1970	6,946	—
1975	7,904	+2.63%
1980	10,267	+5.37%
1990	14,179	+3.28%
1995	15,208	+1.32%
2000	17,932	+3.60%
2007	18,833	+0.68%
2010	20,304	+2.77%
2015	22,314	+1.81%
2020	25,942	+3.22%
2024	28,436	+2.23%
Source: Philippine Statistics Authority

== Economy ==
Poverty incidence of Socorro (%)

Source: Philippine Statistics Authority

Socorro is a tourist destination and agricultural town, featuring the Sohoton Lagoons, Rock Islands, and the Atoyay Farmstead. The area also includes white sand beaches, limestone forests with high biodiversity, and communal agricultural areas like the Atoyay Farmstead. Notable wildlife species in the limestone forests include the tarsier, hornbill, and civet cat. Other attractions include several accessible lakes, Magkahuyog Falls, and extensive mangrove areas. Historical sites, such as the Colorum Uprising landmark, commemorating a 1924 revolt by a religious sect against government forces, while the Socorro Swimming Pool, originating from local springs, is a popular recreational site.

Socorro also has abundant yet undeveloped mineral resources, such as ore covering 50 hectares (120 acres), nickel 60 hectares (150 acres), and iron and gold covering 70 hectares (170 acres).
