= 2016 Naga, Camarines Sur, local elections =

17th Mayoral elections in the city of Naga, Camarines Sur

- May 9, 2016
- Registered: 85,473
- Mayoral election
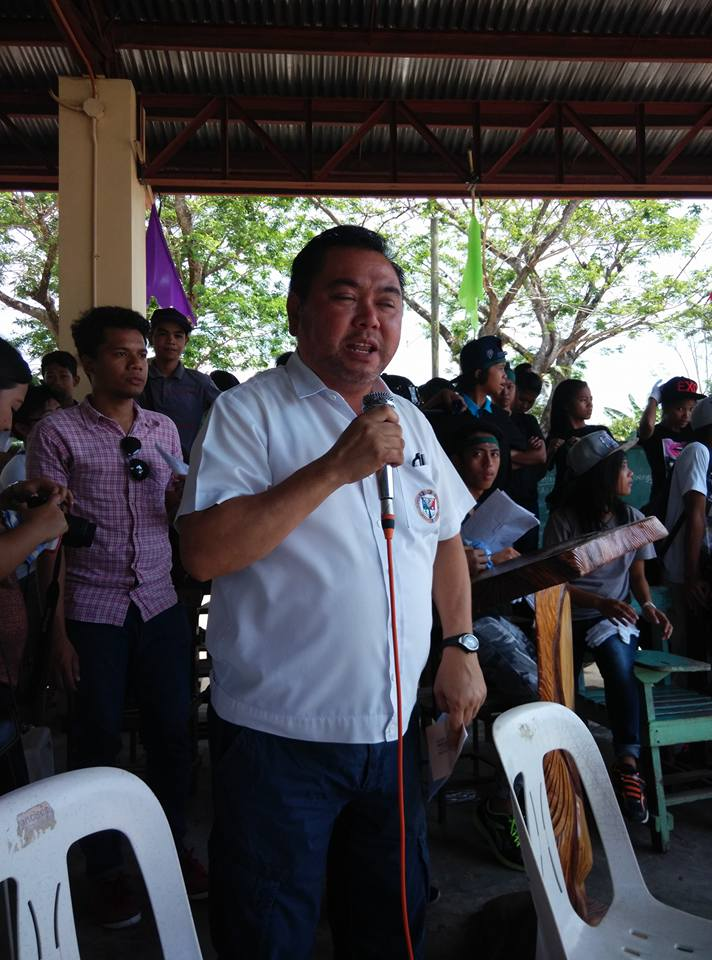

Candidate	John Bongat	Fortunato “Tato” Mendoza
Party	Liberal	Independent
Alliance	Team Naga	None
Running mate	Nelson Legacion
Popular vote	44,012	21,109
Percentage	66.75%	32.02%
Mayor before election
John Bongat
Liberal
Elected mayor
John Bongat
Liberal
- Vice Mayoral election
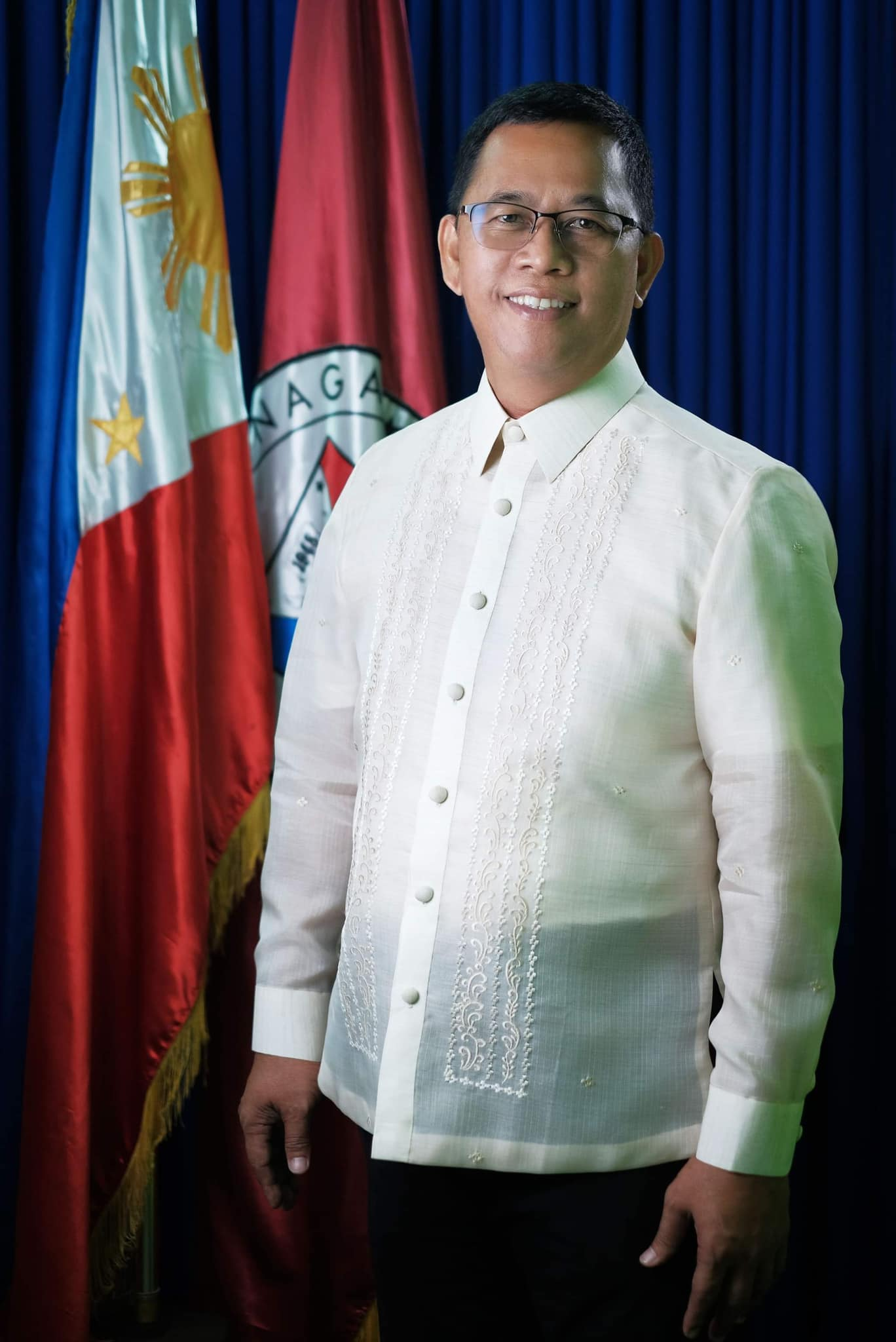

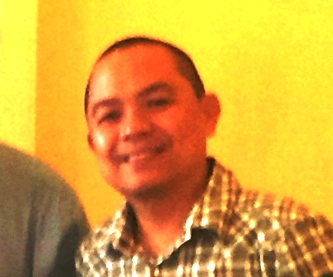
Candidate	Nelson Legacion	Nathan Sergio
Party	Liberal	Independent
Alliance	Team Naga	None
Popular vote	39,418	20,904
Percentage	63.99%	33.94%
Vice Mayor before election
Nelson Legacion
Liberal
Elected Vice Mayor
Nelson Legacion
Liberal

Local elections were held in Naga, Camarines Sur, on May 9, 2016, as part of the 2016 Philippine general election. Voters elected a mayor, vice mayor, ten members of the Naga City Council, and one member of the House of Representatives of the Philippines.

Incumbent mayor John Bongat and vice mayor Nelson Legacion were re-elected under the Liberal Party, winning by large margins against their independent opponents. Their coalition, known locally as "Team Naga", retained control of most city government positions.

== Background ==
In 2013, the Liberal Party also dominated the local elections in Naga City, winning the mayoralty, vice mayoralty, and majority of city council seats. The city is widely considered a stronghold of the Robredo family and the Liberal Party, with Naga consistently voting for LP-aligned candidates both locally and nationally.

Then-Congresswoman Leni Robredo, widow of former mayor Jesse Robredo, was elected to the Philippine House of Representatives in 2013 and was the Liberal Party’s vice presidential candidate in the 2016 national elections.

== Tickets ==
Names italicized are those of candidates seeking re-election.

=== Administration coalition ===
Team Naga
Position	#	Candidate	Party
Mayor	1.	John Bongat	Liberal
Vice Mayor	1.	Nelson Legacion	Liberal
Councilor	1.	Gregorio R. Abonal	Liberal
Councilor	2.	Mila S.D. Raquid-Arroyo	Liberal
Councilor	3.	Elmer S. Baldemoro	Liberal
Councilor	4.	Vidal P. Castillo	Liberal
Councilor	5.	Cecilia Veluz-De Asis	Liberal
Councilor	6.	Salvador M. Del Castillo	Liberal
Councilor	7.	Joselito S.A. Del Rosario	Liberal
Councilor	8.	Julian C. Lavadia Jr.	Liberal
Councilor	9.	Jose C. Rañola, M.D.	Liberal
Councilor	10.	Ray-An Cydrick G. Rentoy	Liberal

== Mayoral election ==
The 2016 Naga City mayoral election was held on May 9, 2016, as part of the 2016 Philippine general elections. Incumbent Mayor John Bongat ran for re-election under the Liberal Party and won a decisive victory.

Bongat defeated several independent candidates, most notably Fortunato "Tato" Mendoza, a former city councilor, and Luis Ortega. He began his third and final term as mayor following the election.

=== Candidates ===
==== Declared ====
- John Bongat (Liberal), incumbent mayor of Naga
- Fortunato "Tato" Mendoza (Independent)
- Luis Ortega (Independent)

=== Results ===
John Bongat won with over 66% of the vote, defeating Mendoza and Ortega by a wide margin.

2016 Naga, Camarines Sur, mayoral election
Candidate	Party	Votes	%
John Bongat	Liberal	44,012	66.75
Fortunato "Tato" Mendoza	Independent	21,109	32.01
Luis Ortega	Independent	814	1.23
Total		65,935	100.00
Liberal hold			
Source: Commission on Elections

== Vice mayoral election ==
=== Candidates ===
==== Declared ====
- Nelson Legacion (Liberal), incumbent vice mayor
- David Casper Nathan Sergio (Independent), former city councilor
- Bebot Calleja (Independent)

=== Results ===
Legacion secured the vice mayoralty with a strong lead, continuing the Liberal Party’s local dominance in Naga. He began his 2nd term as vice mayor following the election.

2016 Naga, Camarines Sur, vice mayoral election
Candidate	Party	Votes	%
Nelson Legacion	Liberal	39,418	63.98
David Casper Nathan Sergio	Independent	20,904	33.93
Bebot Calleja	Independent	1,289	2.09
Total		61,611	100.00
Liberal hold			
Source: Commission on Elections

== 2016 Naga City Council election ==
The Naga City Council is composed of 12 councillors, 10 of whom are elected.

=== Overview ===
Party	Votes	%	Seats
Liberal Party	343,609	73.43	10
NPC	95,300	20.36	0
Independent	29,057	6.21	0
Ex officio seats			2
Total	467,966	100.00	12

2016 Naga City Council election
Candidate	Party	Votes	%
Nene De Asis	Liberal Party	42,592	9.10
Greg Abonal	Liberal Party	37,596	8.03
Sonny Ranola	Liberal Party	35,111	7.50
Elmer Baldemoro	Liberal Party	34,069	7.28
Miles Arroyo	Liberal Party	33,933	7.25
Jun Lavadia	Liberal Party	33,786	7.22
Lito del Rosario	Liberal Party	32,834	7.02
Vidal Castillo	Liberal Party	32,237	6.89
Ray-an Rentoy	Liberal Party	31,035	6.63
Buddy Del Castillo	Liberal Party	30,416	6.50
Docjess Albeus	NPC	26,972	5.76
Bong Peñas	NPC	18,824	4.02
Anjo Santos	NPC	12,954	2.77
Joeltire Morano	Independent	11,208	2.40
Ernie Abragan	NPC	10,559	2.26
Rolly Salazar	NPC	8,866	1.89
Charlemagne Seechung	NPC	8,708	1.86
Julieta Al-Khuzeem	NPC	8,417	1.80
Kid Calleja	Independent	8,064	1.72
Sammy-Garcia Poloyapoy	Independent	5,965	1.27
Marco Dela Rosa	Independent	3,820	0.82
Total		467,966	100.00
Source: Commission on Elections
