= 2019 Naga, Camarines Sur, local elections =

- May 13, 2019
- Registered: 105,366
- Mayoral election
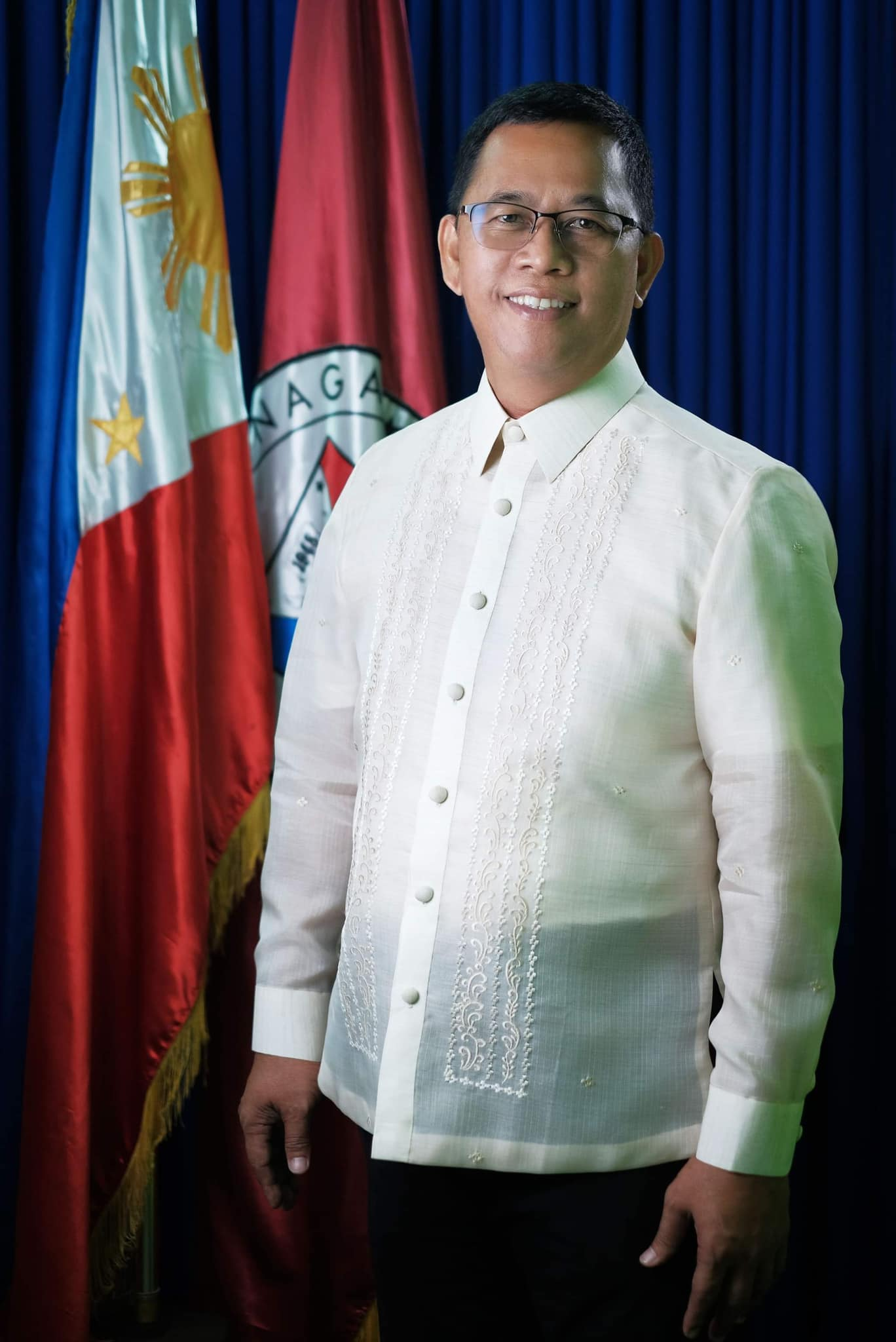

Candidate	Nelson Legacion	Fortunato “Tato” Mendoza
Party	Liberal	Independent
Alliance	Team Naga	None
Running mate	Cecilia de Asis
Popular vote	41,591	33,707
Percentage	54.44%	44.51%
Mayor before election
John Bongat
Liberal
Elected mayor
Nelson Legacion
Liberal
- Vice Mayoral election

Candidate	Cecilia de Asis	Lito Miranda
Party	Liberal	Independent
Alliance	Team Naga	None
Popular vote	59,461	8,114
Percentage	87.13%	11.89%
Vice Mayor before election
Nelson Legacion
Liberal
Elected Vice Mayor
Cecilia V. de Asis
Liberal

Local elections were held in Naga, Camarines Sur, on May 13, 2019, as part of the 2019 Philippine general election. The voters elected a mayor, vice mayor, ten members of the Naga City Council, and a representative for the 3rd District of Camarines Sur.

Incumbent Vice Mayor Nelson Legacion of the Liberal Party, running under Team Naga, was elected mayor, succeeding term-limited John Bongat. Cecilia V. de Asis, the city councilor and former acting vice mayor, won the vice mayoralty. Both won by a wide margin over their independent opponents.

The Liberal Party retained its dominance in the city council, winning most of the available seats.

== Background ==
In 2016, the Liberal Party secured the mayoralty, vice mayoralty, and all seats in the Sangguniang Panlungsod (City Council) of Naga City, led by then-vice mayor John Bongat, who was term-limited and succeeded by his vice mayor Nelson Legacion as the party's mayoral bet.

The 2019 elections were held during the midterm of President Rodrigo Duterte, whose administration was backed by a supermajority coalition nationally. In contrast, Naga remained a Liberal Party stronghold, associated with the legacy of the late Jesse Robredo, former city mayor and interior secretary, and his wife, then-Vice President Leni Robredo.

The party maintained local dominance in 2019 with Legacion winning the mayoralty and incumbent Vice Mayor Cecilia V. de Asis securing reelection. The elections reflected the city’s continued support for the Liberal Party despite the broader national shift toward Duterte-aligned candidates.

== Tickets ==
Names italicized are those of candidates seeking re-election.

=== Administration coalition ===
Team Naga
Position	#	Candidate	Party
Mayor	1.	Nelson Legacion	Liberal
Vice Mayor	1.	Cecilia V. de Asis	Liberal
Councilor	1.	Gregorio R. Abonal	Liberal
Councilor	2.	Mila Sd. Raquid-Arroyo	Liberal
Councilor	3.	Elmer S. Baldemoro	Liberal
Councilor	4.	Vidal P. Castillo	Liberal
Councilor	5.	Salvador M. Del Castillo	Liberal
Councilor	6.	Joselito SA. Del Rosario	Liberal
Councilor	7.	Julian C. Lavadia Jr.	Liberal
Councilor	8.	Jose B. Perez	Liberal
Councilor	9.	Jose C. Rañola, M.D.	Liberal
Councilor	10.	Ghiel G. Rosales	Liberal

== Mayoral election ==
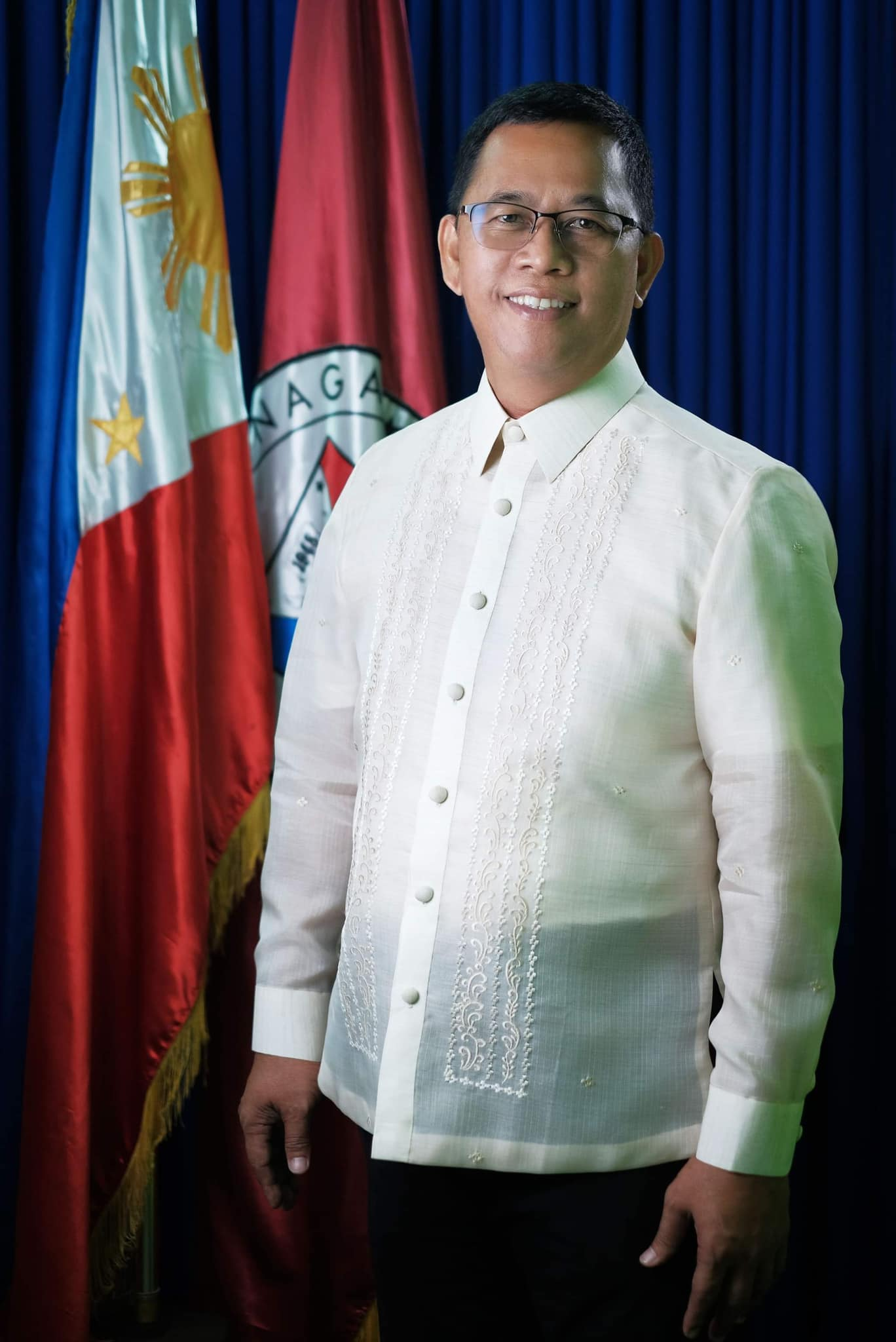
Nelson Legacion was elected mayor of Naga City in 2019.

The 2019 Naga City mayoral election was held on May 13, 2019, as part of the 2019 Philippine general elections. Incumbent Mayor John Bongat was term-limited and did not seek re-election. Then Vice Mayor Nelson Legacion ran for mayor under the Liberal Party and won a decisive victory.

Legacion defeated several independent candidates, most notably Fortunato "Tato" Mendoza, a former city councilor, and Luis Ortega. He began his first term as mayor following the election.

=== Candidates ===
==== Declared ====
- Nelson Legacion (Liberal), Vice Mayor of Naga
- Fortunato "Tato" Mendoza (Independent)
- Luis Ortega (PDDS), former city hall employee

=== Results ===
Nelson Legacion won with over 47% of the vote, defeating Mendoza and Ortega by a wide margin.

2019 Naga, Camarines Sur, mayoral election
Candidate	Party	Votes	%
Nelson Legacion	Liberal	41,591	54.65
Fortunato "Tato" Mendoza	Independent	33,707	44.29
Luis Ortega	PDDS	801	1.05
Total		76,099	100.00
Liberal hold			
Source: Commission on Elections

== Vice mayoral election ==
=== Candidates ===
==== Declared ====
- Cecilia V. de Asis (Liberal), incumbent city councilor
- Lito Miranda (Independent)
- Lex Riva (Independent)

=== Results ===
De Asis secured the vice mayoralty with a lead of over 51,000 votes, marking a continuation of the Liberal Party’s local dominance in Naga.

2019 Naga, Camarines Sur, vice mayoral election
Candidate	Party	Votes	%
Cecilia V. de Asis	Liberal	59,461	87.13
Lito Miranda	Independent	8,114	11.89
Lex Riva	Independent	666	0.98
Total		68,241	100.00
Liberal hold			
Source: Commission on Elections

== City Council election ==
The Naga City Council is composed of 12 councillors, 10 of whom are elected.

2019 Naga, Camarines Sur, City Council election
Candidate	Party	Votes	%
Oying Rosales	Liberal Party	41,362	42.58
Lito del Rosario	Liberal Party	40,495	41.69
Greg Abonal	Liberal Party	38,058	39.18
Miles Raquid Arroyo	Liberal Party	37,661	38.77
Elmer Baldemoro	Liberal Party	37,502	38.61
Vidal Castillo	Liberal Party	36,664	37.74
Badong del Castillo	Liberal Party	36,611	37.69
Sonny Ranola	Liberal Party	36,289	37.36
Joeper Perez	Liberal Party	35,178	36.21
Doc-Jess Albeus	Independent	34,945	35.97
Nathan Sergio	Independent	31,592	32.52
Jun Lavadia	Liberal Party	31,268	32.19
Badette Roco	Independent	27,208	28.01
Allan Reiz Macaraig	Independent	23,953	24.66
Seling Tuason	Independent	22,908	23.58
Eduardo Gregorio	Independent	7,970	8.20
Allan San Juan	Independent	7,057	7.26
Manny Morano	Independent	5,036	5.18
July Catimbang	Independent	4,133	4.25
Mulo San Ramon	Independent	4,115	4.24
Ricardo Mariano	Independent	3,732	3.84
Mulo Portes	Independent	2,960	3.05
Total		546,697	100.00
Registered voters/turnout			–
Source: Commission on Elections

== See also ==
- 2019 Philippine general election
- Politics of Naga, Camarines Sur
