= 2025 Naga, Camarines Sur, local elections =

20th Mayoral elections in the city of Naga, Camarines Sur

- May 12, 2025
- Registered: 121,773
- Mayoral election
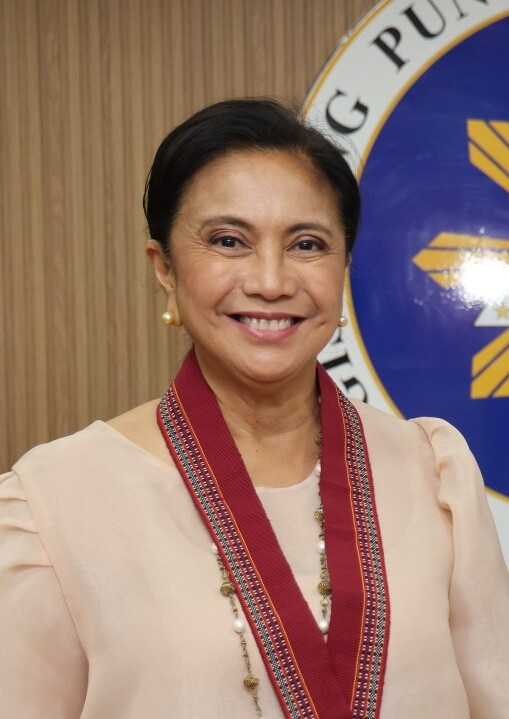

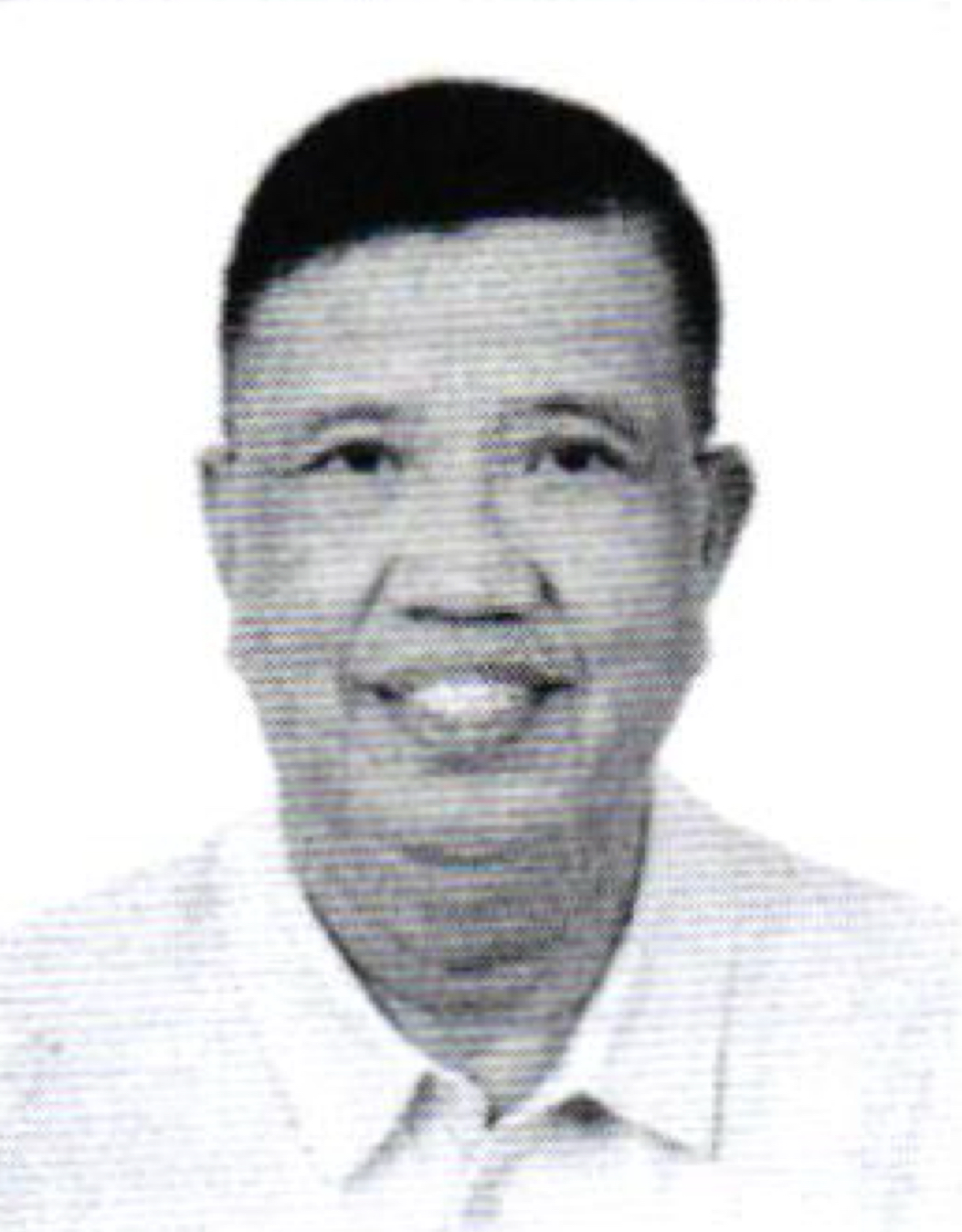
Candidate	Leni Robredo	Restituto de Quiros
Party	Liberal	Independent
Alliance	An Bagong Team Naga	None
Running mate	Gabriel Bordado
Popular vote	83,871	6,032
Percentage	91.65%	6.59%
Mayor before election
Nelson Legacion
Lakas
Elected mayor
Leni Robredo
Liberal
- Vice Mayoral election
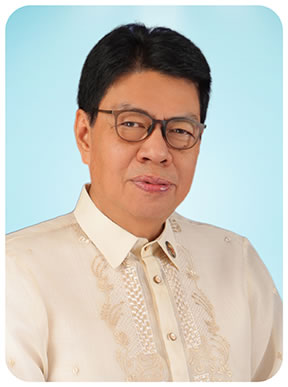

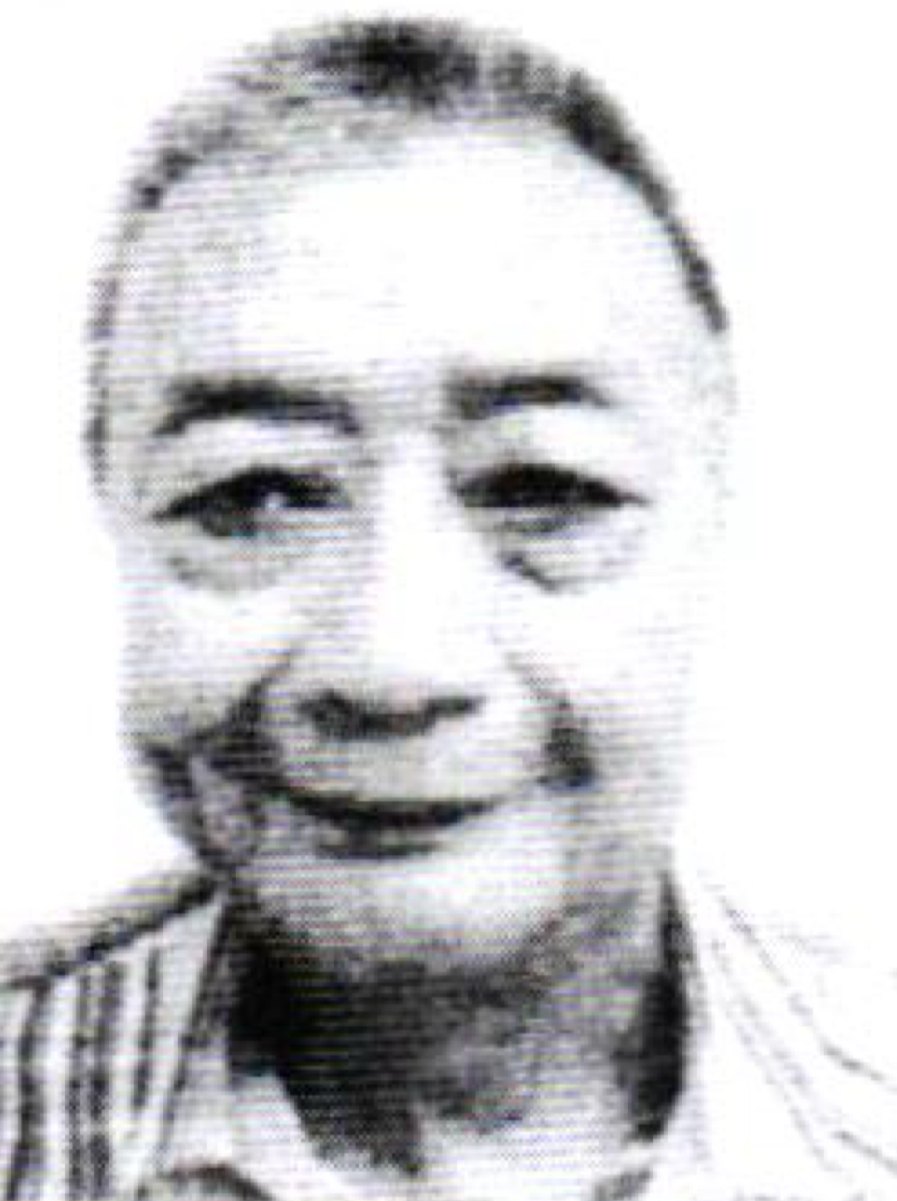
Candidate	Gabriel Bordado	Fortunato Mendoza
Party	Liberal	Independent
Alliance	An Bagong Team Naga	None
Popular vote	46,415	41,252
Percentage	51.64%	45.90%
Vice Mayor before election
Cecilia V. de Asis
Liberal
Elected Vice Mayor
Gabriel Bordado
Liberal

Local elections were held in Naga, Camarines Sur, on May 12, 2025, as part of the 2025 Philippine general election. Voters elected a mayor, vice mayor, ten members of the Naga City Council, and one member of the Philippine House of Representatives.

Former Vice President Leni Robredo and Representative Gabriel Bordado were elected mayor and vice mayor respectively, defeating their closest independent rivals, with the former winning in a landslide. Robredo became the first woman to be elected to the office while Bordado marked his return to the office, which he previously held from 2004 to 2013, during the mayoralties of Jesse Robredo and John Bongat.

Despite their landslide victory in the mayoral race, the Liberal Party, locally contesting the election as An Bagong Team Naga, lost two seats in the Naga City Council to independents Jude Diokno and Nathan Sergio.

== Background ==
In 2022, the Liberal Party won the mayoralty, vice mayoralty, and all ten seats in the city council in a ticket led by incumbent mayor Nelsion Legacion and vice mayor Cecilia V. de Asis. Nationally, Naga and Camarines Sur are both considered Liberal stronghold for former vice president Leni Robredo, with both localities voting for Robredo and Francis Pangilinan for president and vice president respectively in wide margins.

== Coalitions ==
The filing of certificates of candidacies were conducted from October 1 to 8, 2024, from which local slates were formalized and announced.

=== An Bagong Team Naga 2025 ===
Former vice president Leni Robredo and incumbent representative Gabriel Bordado are seeking the mayoralty and vice mayoralty of Naga respectively under the Liberal Party-backed An Bagong Team Naga (lit. 'The New Team Naga'). The ticket is supported by a full ten-member slate for the City Council with candidates selected through community consultation and rigorous evaluation and vetting processes in the tradition started by former mayor and Robredo's husband Jesse.

== Tickets ==
Names italicized are those of candidates seeking re-election.

=== Administration coalition ===
An Bagong Team Naga
Position	#	Candidate	Party
Mayor	4.	Leni Robredo	Liberal
Vice Mayor	1.	Gabriel Bordado	Liberal
Councilor	1.	Gayle Abonal-Gomez	Liberal
Councilor	3.	Jess Albeus	Liberal
Councilor	4.	Miles-Raquid Arroyo	Liberal
Councilor	5.	Elmer Baldemoro	Liberal
Councilor	9.	Butch Borja	Liberal
Councilor	10.	Omar Buenafe	Liberal
Councilor	15.	Areiz Macaraig	Liberal
Councilor	18.	Frank Mendoza	Liberal
Councilor	19.	Jose Perez	Liberal
Councilor	20.	Oying Rosales	Liberal

== Campaign ==
The campaign period for local elections began on March 28, 2025.

=== Campaign themes ===
==== Robredo camp ====
The platform of An Bagong Team Naga has revolved around addressing local issues such as those related to basic services in water, electricity, traffic, and flood control. Robredo has stated that a key priority of her administration would be to continue the programs initiated by her husband Jesse, during his longtime mayoralty of the city.

The ticket's proclamation rally held on March 28. The event was marked by dance performances rather than speeches, to which Robredo said was in tribute for the volunteers that organized the event. Her campaign conducted house-to-house campaigns locally known as “orolay-olay” (lit. 'conversation') across all Naga barangays.

== Mayoral election ==
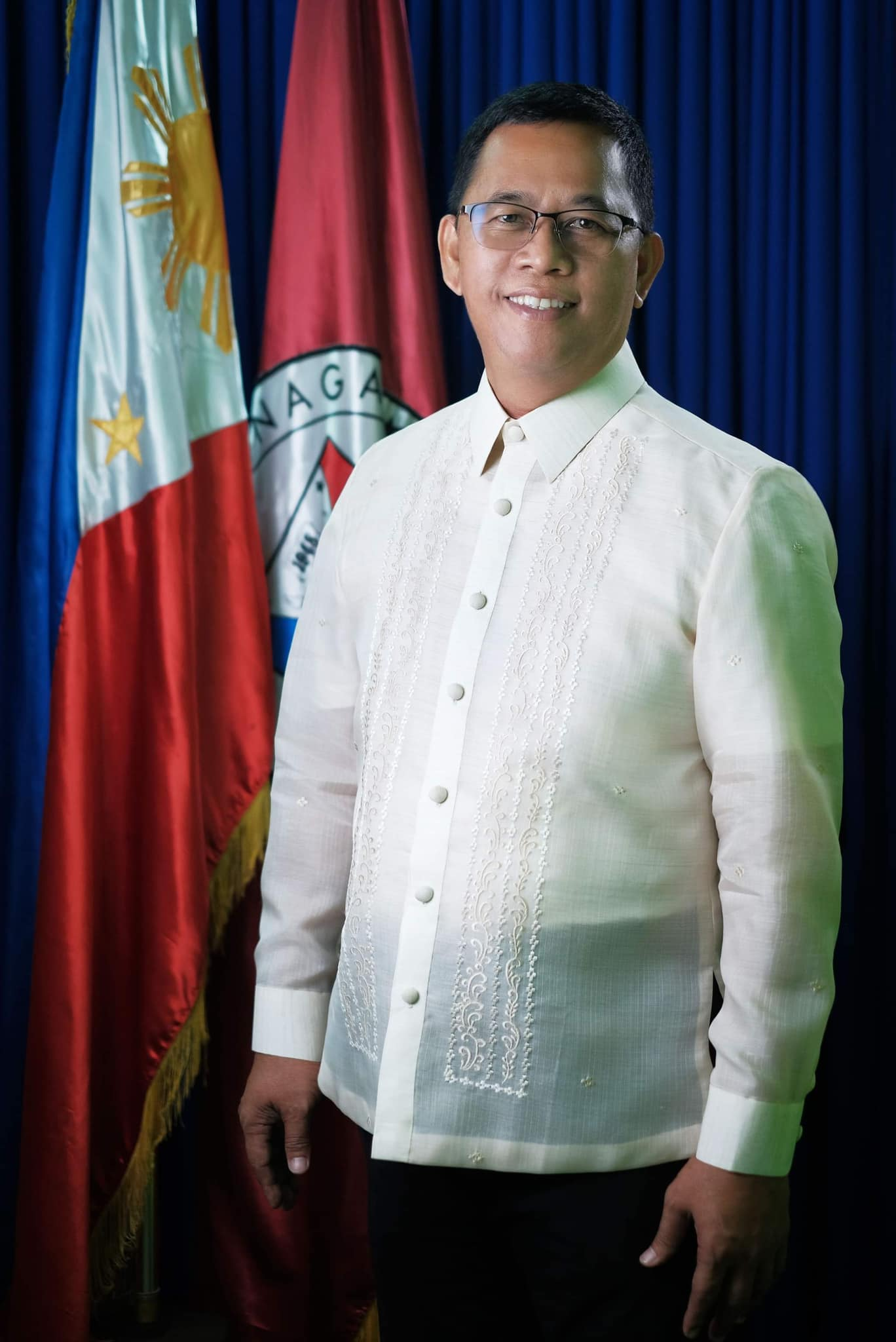
Incumbent two-term mayor Nelson Legacion opted not to seek re-election to give way for the mayoral bid of former vice president Leni Robredo.

The incumbent mayor is Nelson Legacion, who has served since 2019 and was re-elected in 2022 with 42.98% of the vote. Legacion is not seeking re-election to give way for the mayoral bid of former vice president Leni Robredo and instead run for representative in Camarines Sur's 3rd district.

After Robredo was defeated in the 2022 presidential election, organizations and figures from the traditional opposition led by the Liberal Party attempted to draft her to run in the 2025 Senate election. Robredo would decline the calls and instead run for the mayoralty of Naga, citing her preference for executive work over legislation as well as her "passion" for local governance.

Three independent candidates are challenging Robredo for the position. Restituto de Quiros, the former mayor of Pandan, Catanduanes, cited his birth and upbringing in the city as his motivation to run for the mayoralty of Naga. Luis Ortega is running as an alternative to Robredo, having served in the city council under the term of her late husband, Jesse.

=== Candidates ===
==== Declared ====
- Leonida Abrazado (Independent)
- Restituto de Quiros (Independent), former mayor of Pandan, Catanduanes
- Luis Ortega (Independent), former city hall employee
- Leni Robredo (Liberal), former vice president of the Philippines

==== Disallowed ====
- Leonida Cormanes (Independent)

==== Declined ====
- Nelson Legacion (Lakas), incumbent mayor

=== Endorsements ===
Leni Robredo (Liberal)
- Francis Escudero, incumbent senate president

=== Results ===
Robredo won the election in a landslide with over 90% of the vote, becoming the first woman to be elected to the office.

2025 Naga, Camarines Sur, mayoral election
Candidate	Party	Votes	%
Leni Robredo	Liberal	83,871	91.65
Restituto de Quiros	Independent	6,032	6.59
Luis Ortega	Independent	884	0.97
Leonida Abrazado	Independent	721	0.79
Total		91,508	100.00
Registered voters/turnout		121,773	–
Liberal hold			

== Vice mayoral election ==
The incumbent vice mayor is Cecilia V. de Asis, who has served since 2019 and was re-elected in 2022 with 56.21% of the vote. Like Mayor Legacion, de Asis is not seeking re-election to give way for the vice mayoral bid of incumbent representative Gabriel Bordado.

Bordado initially planned to run for mayor upon being term-limited as representative. He backtracked from his plans and instead sought the vice mayoralty to give way for Robredo's bid for the office, running as her running mate.

=== Candidates ===
==== Declared ====
- Gabriel Bordado (Liberal), incumbent representative for Camarines Sur's third district
- Cristopher Fortuna (Independent)
- Fortunato Mendoza (Independent)
- Benjamin Manuel Villafuerte (Independent)

=== Results ===
2025 Naga, Camarines Sur, vice mayoral election
Candidate	Party	Votes	%
Gabriel Bordado	Liberal	46,415	51.64
Fortunato Mendoza	Independent	41,252	45.90
Benjamin Manuel Villafuerte	Independent	1,439	1.60
Cristopher Fortuna	Independent	774	0.86
Total		89,880	100.00
Registered voters/turnout		121,773	–
Liberal hold			

== City Council election ==
The Naga City Council is composed of 12 councillors, 10 of whom are elected.

=== Overview ===
Party	Votes	%	Seats
Liberal	388,696	63.69	8
NUP	55,508	9.10	0
Kusog Bikolandia	15,650	2.56	0
Bunyog Party	3,623	0.59	0
Independent	146,781	24.05	2
Ex officio seats			2
Total	610,258	100.00	12

2025 Naga, Camarines Sur, City Council election
Candidate	Party	Votes	%
Elmer Baldemoro	Liberal	52,841	54.40
Jess Albeus (incumbent)	Liberal	48,172	49.59
Oying Rosales (incumbent)	Liberal	44,492	45.80
Vito Borja II	Liberal	38,839	39.98
Gayle Abonal-Gomez (incumbent)	Liberal	37,612	38.72
Omar Buenafe (incumbent)	Liberal	37,493	38.60
Jude Diokno	Independent	34,819	35.84
Frank Mendoza	Liberal	34,520	35.54
Areiz Macaraig	Liberal	33,406	34.39
Nathan Sergio	Independent	32,028	32.97
Joeper Perez (incumbent)	Liberal	30,989	31.90
Miles-Raquid Arroyo	Liberal	30,332	31.23
Brim Mangubat	NUP	26,100	26.87
Simeon Adan	Independent	19,860	20.45
Jak Villafuerte	Independent	17,574	18.09
Toby Bongon	Independent	17,153	17.66
Boboy Luntok	NUP	15,528	15.99
CK Mendoza	Independent	14,692	15.12
Ferds de Hitta	NUP	13,880	14.29
Nono Salak	Kusog Bikolandia	9,842	10.13
Hector Sales	Independent	7,728	7.96
Gil Belen	Kusog Bikolandia	5,808	5.98
Bert Benitez	Bunyog Party	3,623	3.73
July Catimbang	Independent	2,927	3.01
Total		610,258	100.00
Registered voters/turnout		121,773	–
Source: Commission on Elections
