= Antonio Gerona =

Filipino lawyer and judge (1933–2013)

- Born: Antonio Nicomedes Gerona; January 17, 1933; Bulan, Sorsogon, Insular Government of the Philippine Islands
- Died: October 10, 2013 (aged 80); Naga, Camarines Sur, Philippines
- Occupation: Judge
- Spouse: Salvacion Santo Tomas
- Children: 3 (including Leni)

Antonio Nicomedes Gerona, Sr. (January 17, 1933 – October 10, 2013) was a Filipino lawyer and jurist, known as the father of former Vice President Leni Robredo.

== Career ==
Gerona practiced law for 19 years before being appointed as a judge of the Municipal Trial Court in Cities, Branch 2 on July 9, 1980. He also served as a judge of Regional Trial Court Branch 28 in Naga City from January 30, 1987. Since 1995, Gerona was also a professor of Law at the University of Nueva Caceres in Naga City.

== Personal life ==
Gerona hails from the Gerona clan of Bulan, Sorsogon. He married Salvacion Santo Tomas of Naga City.

He died on October 10, 2013, at the Mother Seton Hospital in Naga City due to cardiac arrest.
