= Angat Buhay =

Philippine nonprofit organization

- Angat Pinas, Inc.
- Logo of the organization
- Formation: July 1, 2022; 4 years ago
- Founder: Leni Robredo
- Founded at: Quezon City, Philippines
- Type: Nonprofit organization Non-governmental organization
- Legal status: Foundation
- Region served: Philippines
- Fields: Education; health; food security; nutrition; disaster response
- Chairperson: Leni Robredo
- President: Rafael Cojuangco Lopa
- Executive director: Raffy Magno
- Website: www.angatbuhay.ph

Angat Buhay Foundation, incorporated as Angat Pinas, Inc., is a non-profit, non-governmental organization based in the Philippines. It was founded and officially launched on July 1, 2022, a day after its founder Leni Robredo's term as Vice President of the Philippines expired.

The foundation aims to continue the anti-poverty and pandemic response programs started during Robredo's tenure as vice president, which all went under the same umbrella name of "Angat Buhay" (a Tagalog word meaning 'improve life's condition'; lit. 'Lift Life'). The foundation is focused on four key areas: health, education, food security, and disaster risk response. In 2023, Angat Buhay expanded internationally with the establishment of a nonprofit chapter in the United States.

== History and founding ==
Angat Buhay was launched with a two-day street party and art exhibit, the proceeds from which were made part of the foundation's program funds. On June 30, 2022, the foundation announced that its first project would be a dormitory for the indigent students of Southern Luzon State University (SLSU) in Quezon.

== Angat Buhay program under the Office of the Vice President ==
Before the Angat Buhay Foundation was created in 2022, Angat Buhay operated as an anti-poverty program under the Office of the Vice President. By the end of 2021, it had reached families in 223 cities and municipalities, worked with 372 partner organizations, and received about ₱520 million in funding, mostly from private-sector donations.

Its programs focused on areas such as health, education, food security, disaster response, housing, rural development, and support for women and youth. Projects included COVID-19 testing, and vaccination efforts, telemedicine, learning hubs, livelihood assistance, health services, school facilities, and disaster reliefs.

=== Funding of the earlier program ===
During its time under the Office of the Vice President, Angat Buhay operated without dedicated government budget and relied on partnerships with private organizations to fund its projects.

== Programs and iniatives ==
Since its launch, Angat Buhay has continued programs in education, health and nutrition, disaster response, community development, and volunteer work. Its projects have included building classrooms and dormitories, supporting literacy programs, providing health services, improving food security, and assisting communities affected by disasters.

=== Mental health initiative ===
In 2024, Angat Buhay worked with Councilor Gayle Abonal Gomez and the Ateneo de Naga Department of Psychology to launch the ANGAT KAHIMATI Mental Health Program in Naga City. The program offered counseling services and was later adopted by the city government. In 2026, a permanent mental hub was opened to give the program a dedicated space for counseling and support.

== Recognition and reach ==
In July 2022, a statement by the Ateneo de Manila University announced that a new species of water scavenger beetle, discovered in Ifugao by Enrico Gerard Sanchez, will be named after Angat Buhay's anti-poverty program with the scientific name Anacaena angatbuhay.

In an interview reported in the Harvard International Review on October 22, 2022, Robredo said that Angat Buhay during her term mobilized about a billion U.S. dollars. She said that Angat Buhay was present in over 300 communities and partnered with about 700 organizations.

== United States Chapter ==
Angat Buhay expanded to the United States in 2023 with the formation of a nonprofit chapter. The new chapter gave the organization a formal presence outside The Philippines and created another avenue for overseas supporters to take part in its work. In 2024, Leni Robredo visited Southern California and Nevada to meet with supporters and discuss Angat Buhay's programs. A fundraising event in West Covina raised more than $35,000 for the organization. Angat Buhay USA also indicated plans to widen its reach among communities in the United States and Canada.

== Community Engagement ==
Angat Buhay promotes bayanihan, or collective community action, as part of its approach to volunteerism and community development. Robredo has used the phrase “Tutulong na rin lang, tumulong na nang maayos.” (If you are going to help, help well.) in describing the organization's approach to service.
