= Tricia Robredo =

Filipino doctor and former television personality

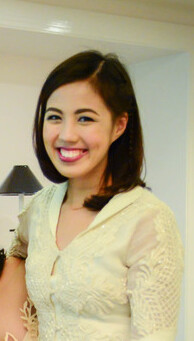
- Robredo in 2016
- Born: Janine Patricia Gerona Robredo; July 18, 1994 (age 32)
- Education: Ateneo de Manila University (BS HSc, M.D., MBA)
- Occupations: Physician; TV reporter (formerly)
- Parents: Jesse Robredo; Leni Robredo

Janine Patricia "Tricia" Gerona Robredo (born July 18, 1994) is a Filipino physician and former courtside reporter for the National University Bulldogs in the University Athletic Association of the Philippines (UAAP).

== Biography ==
Tricia Robredo is the second daughter of former interior secretary Jesse Robredo (1958–2012) and former vice president Leni Robredo.

While studying at the Ateneo de Manila University for college, Robredo joined the UAAP coverage team of ABS-CBN Sports in 2013 as a courtside reporter for the National University (NU) Bulldogs. She said that her sideline gig was for her late father, an avid basketball fan, who died in a plane crash the previous year. Her mother said that Tricia was the most affected by his death. She stayed as a courtside reporter until 2014, when the NU basketball team won the championship.

Robredo later studied at the Ateneo School of Medicine and Public Health from 2014 while continuing to report for the NU Bulldogs. She received her medical degree and an MBA from the Ateneo in 2020. She also passed the Philippine physician licensure medical examination that same year. She then pursued a graduate degree in Global Health Delivery at the Harvard Medical School in 2022.

While campaigning for her mother in 2022, Tricia Robredo led a campaign sortie called 'Angatleta sa Araneta' at the Araneta Coliseum in Quezon City, which was attended by athletes, especially former UAAP volleyball players who endorsed her mother for president.

During the campaign, Robredo and her older sister Aika asked the National Bureau of Investigation to conduct a probe against those who spread fake lewd photos of them.

Robredo has been engaged to her partner since November 2024.
