= Nelson Legacion =

Filipino lawyer and politician

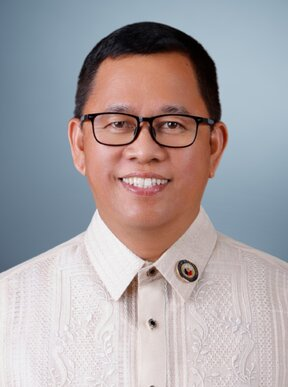
- Official portrait, 2025

Member of the Philippine House of Representatives from Camarines Sur's 3rd District
- Incumbent
- Assumed office June 30, 2025
- Preceded by: Gabriel Bordado

17th Mayor of Naga City
- In office June 30, 2019 – June 30, 2025
- Vice Mayor: Cecilia Veluz-De Asis
- Preceded by: John G. Bongat
- Succeeded by: Leni Robredo

Vice Mayor of Naga
- In office June 30, 2013 – June 30, 2019
- Mayor: John G. Bongat
- Preceded by: Gabriel Bordado
- Succeeded by: Cecilia Veluz-De Asis

Member of the Naga City Council
- In office June 30, 2007 – June 30, 2013

Personal details
- Born: Nelson Salvadora Legacion; March 1, 1968 (age 58) Buhi, Camarines Sur, Philippines
- Party: NPC (2026–present)
- Other political affiliations: Lakas (2024–2026); Liberal (2007–2024)
- Spouse: Marion Eloisa Escueta
- Children: 4
- Education: Saint Anthony Mary Claret College (AB); University of Nueva Caceres (LLB)
- Occupation: Lawyer
- Profession: Lawyer; politician

Nelson Salvadora Legacion (born March 1, 1968) is a Filipino lawyer and politician currently serving as the representative for Camarines Sur's 3rd district since 2025. Prior to his election to Congress, he served as mayor of Naga, Camarines Sur from 2019 to 2025 and held various other positions in local government.

== Early life and education ==
Legacion was born in Buhi, Camarines Sur, Philippines. He completed his AB Philosophy degree at Saint Anthony Mary Claret College and later earned his Bachelor of Laws from the University of Nueva Caceres. He passed the Philippine Bar Examination in 1995.

== Career ==
=== Legal career ===
Before entering public service, Legacion worked as a practicing lawyer. He served as the City Legal Officer of Naga City, where he was instrumental in various landmark legal cases involving the city government. Among the notable cases was his legal advocacy in securing the rightful ownership of the Naga City Hall premises after the city’s separation from the province-led Capitol Complex, a matter that involved complex property claims and political tension.

=== Political career ===
He was elected as Naga City Councilor for two consecutive terms (2007–2013), focusing on legislation to uplift underprivileged communities. Subsequently, he served as Vice Mayor (2013–2019), introducing reforms to expedite legislation and promote welfare‑oriented policies.

In 2019, Legacion was elected Mayor of Naga City and re-elected in 2022. His administration was marked by large-scale infrastructure and social service projects, including the construction of new public schools, the Naga City General Hospital (Level 1), a Super Health Center, and the Center for Safety and Resilience.

He also led major urban development initiatives in four growth zones: the Sta. Cruz New Development Area, the Almeda Development Area, the Bicol Riverfront, and the Balatas Development Complex.

In January 2025, he issued a public call for responsible political discourse and condemned the spread of fake news targeting city officials and candidates.

Legacion assumed office as the representative for Camarines Sur’s 3rd congressional district on June 30, 2025. He is a member of the Lakas–Christian Muslim Democrats.

=== Future political plans ===
In early 2024, the founder of the Bikoleni Movement and Kusog Bikolandia party, known for supporting former vice president Leni Robredo's (widow of Jesse) 2022 presidential bid, denied rumors of running for mayor in the 2025 Naga City elections. He stated that his focus remained on his business ventures.

In June 2024, Legacion expressed openness to running for Congress representing the Camarines Sur's 3rd congressional district in the 2025 elections, though he indicated a personal preference to continue serving as mayor to complete ongoing programs and projects. Local leaders outside the city have expressed support for his potential congressional bid.

On October 8, 2024, Legacion filed his certificate of candidacy for Camarines Sur's 3rd District congressional seat at the Provincial Capitol Complex. Accompanied by his wife, Marion Eloisa, and supporters, he emphasized fighting political dynasties and amending laws allowing governors to suspend mayors. Running under Lakas–CMD, Legacion highlighted support from allies committed to development, particularly for marginalized sectors.

== Legal matters ==
In 2024, a cyber libel complaint filed by Legacion against a private individual was dismissed by the Naga City Prosecutor's Office due to insufficient evidence.

In May 2024, he and former mayor John Bongat faced charges before the ombudsman regarding a lease agreement between the local government and Lumver Consolidated Complex Development Corporation.

== Personal life ==
Legacion is married to Marion Eloisa Escueta, who is also a lawyer. They have four children.

== Electoral history ==
Electoral history of Nelson Legacion
Year	Office	Party	Votes received				Result
Year	Office	Party	Total	%	P.	Swing	Result
2007	Councilor (Naga City)	Liberal	27,732	-	9th	-	Won
2010	Councilor (Naga City)	Liberal	33,064	7.48%	2nd	-	Won
2013	Vice Mayor of Naga City	Liberal	26,471	54.41%	1st	—N/a	Won
2016	Vice Mayor of Naga City	Liberal	39,418	63.98%	1st	+9.57	Won
2019	Mayor of Naga City	Liberal	41,591	54.65%	1st	—N/a	Won
2022	Mayor of Naga City	Liberal	41,606	42.98%	1st	-11.67	Won
2025	Representative (Camarines Sur–3rd)	Lakas	112,088	43.43%	1st	—N/a	Won
