= Leni Robredo =

Vice President of the Philippines from 2016 to 2022

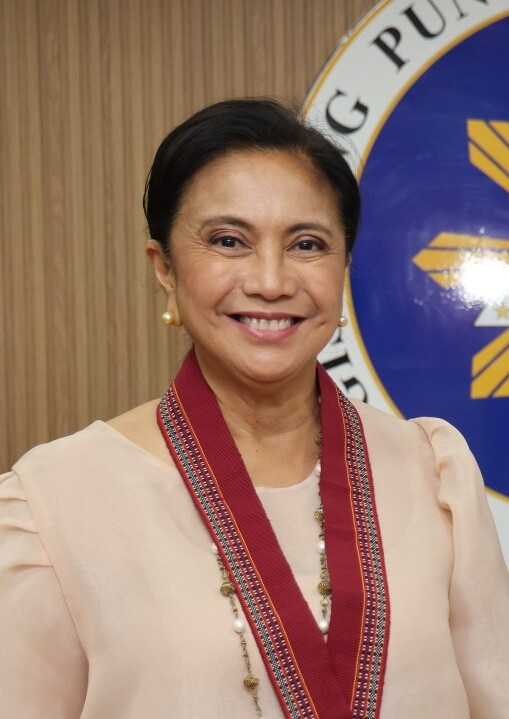
- Robredo in 2025

18th Mayor of Naga
- Incumbent
- Assumed office June 30, 2025
- Vice Mayor: Gabriel Bordado
- Preceded by: Nelson Legacion

14th Vice President of the Philippines
- In office June 30, 2016 – June 30, 2022
- President: Rodrigo Duterte
- Preceded by: Jejomar Binay
- Succeeded by: Sara Duterte

Member of the Philippine House of Representatives from Camarines Sur's 3rd congressional district
- In office June 30, 2013 – June 30, 2016
- Preceded by: Luis Villafuerte
- Succeeded by: Gabriel Bordado
Appointive positions
Co-chairperson of the Inter-Agency Committee on Anti-Illegal Drugs
In office November 6, 2019 – November 24, 2019
President	Rodrigo Duterte
Preceded by	Office established
Succeeded by	Dante Jimenez
Chairperson of the Housing and Urban Development Coordinating Council
In office July 12, 2016 – December 5, 2016
President	Rodrigo Duterte
Preceded by	Chito Cruz
Succeeded by	Leoncio Evasco Jr.
Other roles and positions
Chairperson of Angat Buhay
Incumbent
Assumed office July 1, 2022
Preceded by	Office established
Chairperson of the Liberal Party
In office August 10, 2017 – June 30, 2022
Preceded by	Benigno Aquino III
Succeeded by	Francis Pangilinan

Personal details
- Born: Maria Leonor Santo Tomas Gerona; April 23, 1965 (age 61) Naga, Camarines Sur, Philippines
- Party: Liberal (since 2012)
- Spouse: Jesse Robredo (m. 1987; died 2012)
- Children: 3, including Tricia
- Education: University of the Philippines Diliman (BA); University of Nueva Caceres (LL.B)
- Occupation: Politician; lawyer

Maria Leonor "Leni" Gerona Robredo (Tagalog: [ˈlɛnɪ ɾɔˈbrɛdɔ]; née Gerona; born April 23, 1965) is a Filipino lawyer, stateswoman and politician who has been serving as the 18th mayor of Naga since 2025, having previously served as the 14th vice president of the Philippines from 2016 to 2022 under President Rodrigo Duterte.

Robredo is the second female vice president of the Philippines, after Gloria Macapagal Arroyo, and the first from the Bicol Region. She represented Camarines Sur in the Philippine House of Representatives from 2013 to 2016. She later announced her candidacy for the 2016 vice presidential election as the running mate of Mar Roxas. She won the election, defeating Senator Bongbong Marcos by a narrow margin. She has spearheaded multiple programs in the Office of the Vice President (OVP); her flagship anti-poverty program, Angat Buhay (lit. 'Uplifting Lives'), has helped address key areas including education, rural development, and healthcare, in partnership with more than 300 organizations. During the COVID-19 pandemic in the Philippines, the OVP under Robredo responded by providing free shuttle services for frontline workers, swab tests, telehealth services, and raised funds for relief operations across the country. Robredo was awarded by the government of Thailand in 2016 for her work and advocacy in women's empowerment and gender equality. Under her leadership, the OVP also received the ISO 9001: 2015 certification for the office's quality management systems.

During her vice presidency, she served as the chair of the Liberal Party and de facto leader of the opposition to President Rodrigo Duterte's administration, where she was appointed by Duterte and briefly served as the chair of the Housing and Urban Development Coordinating Council and the co-chairperson of the Inter-Agency Committee on Anti-Illegal Drugs. She has received backlash from government supporters for her being staunchly critical to Duterte's policies such as the war on drugs, counter-insurgency initiatives, COVID-19 pandemic response, and soft stance toward China. She has been a constant target of disinformation, with many articles making false claims about her personal life to discredit her.

In 2021, Robredo filed her candidacy in the 2022 presidential elections with Liberal Party leader and Senator Francis Pangilinan as her running mate. Their ticket was ultimately defeated by Marcos and Davao City Mayor Sara Duterte. Following the loss, she founded Angat Buhay, a nonprofit organization, before successfully running for mayor of Naga, Camarines Sur, in 2025.

== Early life and education ==
Leni Robredo was born as Maria Leonor Santo Tomas Gerona on April 23, 1965, in Naga, Camarines Sur, Philippines. She was the first of three children born to Naga City Regional Trial Court Judge Antonio Gerona (c. 1933–2013) and Salvacion Santo Tomas (1936–2020).

Robredo attended the basic education department of Universidad de Sta. Isabel de Naga, graduating from elementary school in 1978, and from high school in 1982. She earned her degree in Bachelor of Arts in Economics from the University of the Philippines School of Economics at UP Diliman in 1986, and proceeded to study law at the University of Nueva Caceres, graduating in 1992. Gerona chose to temporarily forego law studies and instead decided to work as a researcher for the Bicol River Basin Development Program (BRBDP), a government agency tasked with integrated area development planning in the three provinces of the Bicol Region. Here she met then-program director Jesse Robredo, who would eventually become her husband. She passed the bar exams on her second attempt in 1996 and was admitted to the Integrated Bar of the Philippines in May 1997.

Following her admission, Robredo served in the Public Attorney's Office, a role in which she often took up the defense for cases pursued by her husband, who by then had become Mayor of Naga.

From 1998 to 2008, Robredo became the coordinator of Sentro ng Alternatibong Lingap Panligan (SALIGAN), a Naga-based alternative legal support group. SALIGAN's work aimed to encourage young legal professionals to take on leadership roles, and involved visiting distant rural communities to provide legal services to residents who would otherwise have little or no access to such services, as well as conducting legal advocacy by proposing amendments and new laws based on the needs of these marginalized communities. Later, the group's focus shifted to include helping rural women to acquire capital in order to participate in competitive markets.

In addition, Robredo founded the Lakas ng Kababaihan ng Naga Federation (Women Power of Naga Federation), an organization that provides training and livelihood opportunities for women, in 1989.

In 2012, Robredo was named the chairperson of the Liberal Party in Camarines Sur.

== House of Representatives (2013–2016) ==
=== Election ===
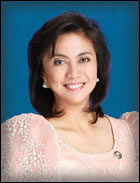
Portrait of Leni Robredo during her term as Camarines Sur representative in the 16th Congress

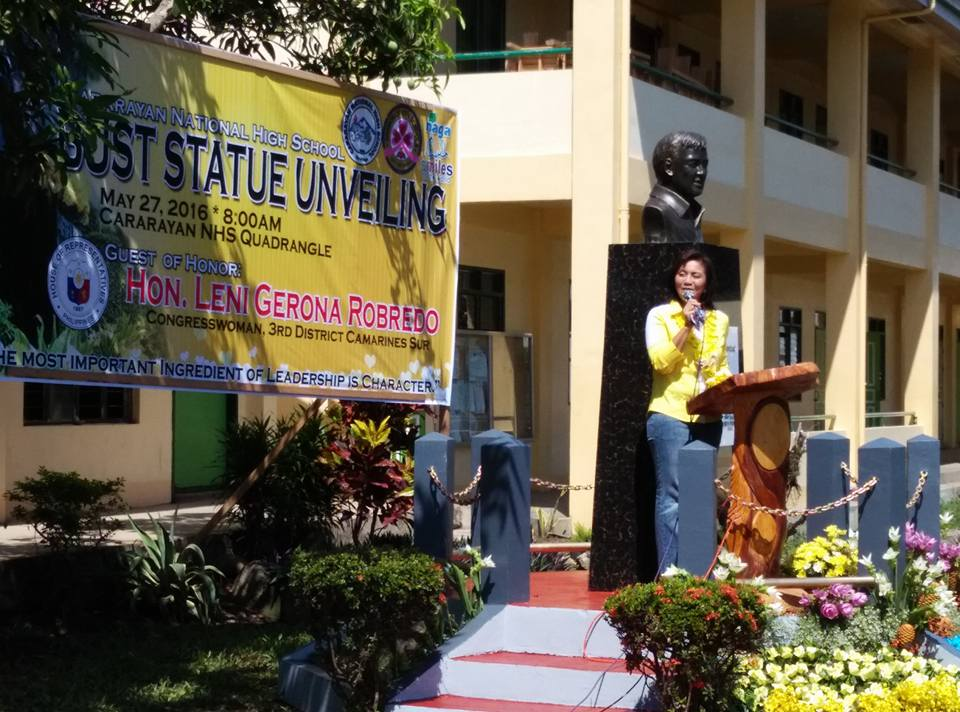
Leni Robredo unveiling the Jesse Robredo Monument at the Cararayan National High School in Naga, May 27, 2016

Robredo ran for representative in Camarines Sur's third district in 2013. On May 16, 2013, she was proclaimed the winner of the seat, defeating Nelly Favis-Villafuerte, the wife of former Representative Luis Villafuerte and member of the politically powerful Villafuerte dynasty.

=== Tenure ===
During her term in congress, Robredo was the vice chairman of the House committees on good governance, public accountability, and revision of laws, and a member of 11 other house panels. She was known for being a strong advocate of the Freedom of Information Act, and a strong supporter of the Bangsamoro Basic Law.

Participatory governance and transparency were the major objectives and thrusts of Robredo's legislative agenda. The first law Robredo authored in congress was the Full Disclosure Policy Bill (HB 19), which would have mandated all government agencies and their sub-units and projects to disclose their budget and financial transactions in a conspicuous manner "without any requests from the public." Concerned that the marginalized sector should not be denied access to government frontline services and public meetings based on their attire, she sponsored the Open Door Policy Act (House Bill No. 6286), which prohibits government offices and agencies from implementing strict dress codes.

Robredo also authored the People Empowerment Bill (HB 4911), which sought to allow more participation from Filipinos in decision and policy-making, and the Participatory Budget Process Bill (HB 3905), which sought to increase participation in budget-related decisions in government projects by locals. She also wrote the Comprehensive Anti-Discrimination Bill (HB 3432) to prohibit discrimination on the basis of ethnicity, race, religion or belief, sex, gender, sexual orientation, gender identity and expressions, language, disability, HIV status, etc.

To promote transparency in the taxation process, she sponsored the house version (House Bill 05831) of what would eventually become Republic Act RA10708, the Tax Incentives Management and Transparency Act of 2009 (TIMTA).

Other major legislation co-authored by Robredo includes the Anti-Dynasty Bill and the Healthy Beverage Options Act (House Bill 4021).

==== Legislative portfolio ====
As a member of the 16th Congress, Robredo was one of the principal authors of the house version of "The Tax Incentives Management and Transparency Act (TIMTA)" (Republic Act RA10708, House Bill 05831), which was enacted on December 9, 2015. She also co-authored the house version of the following laws: the "National Children's Month Act," Republic Act RA10661 (HB01641) enacted on May 29, 2015, declaring the celebration of the national children's month on November of every year; the "Charter of the Quezon City Development Authority," Republic Act RA10646 (HB03899), lapsed into law on November 8, 2014; the "Open High School System Act," Republic Act RA10665 (HB04085) enacted on July 9, 2015, establishing and appropriating funds for the open high school system; Republic Act RA10638 (HB04089), extending the corporate life of the Philippine National Railways for another 50 years, enacted on June 16, 2014; Republic Act RA10707 (HB04147), amending the "Probation Law of 1976" enacted on November 26, 2015, rationalizing and strengthening the probation system; the "Graphic Health Warnings Law," Republic Act RA10643 (HB04590), enacted on November 15, 2014, prescribing the printing of graphic health warnings on tobacco products; Republic Act RA10655 (HB05280), decriminalizing premature remarriages, enacted on March 13, 2015; and the "Sangguniang Kabataan Reform Act.of 2015," Republic Act RA10742 (HB06043), enacted on January 15, 2016.

In addition, Robredo was one of many co-authors of the National Budgets for the years 2014 (RA10633, HB02630, enacted on December 20, 2013), 2015 (RA10651, HB04968, enacted on December 23, 2014), and 2016 (RA10717, HB06132, enacted on December 22, 2015).

Robredo was also a key supporter of: HB 4911: People Empowerment Bill to create a partnership between local governments and civil society through the establishment of a people's council in every local government unit. This act also prescribes the powers and functions of said council; HB 3432: Comprehensive Anti-Discrimination to prohibit discrimination on the basis of ethnicity, race, religion or belief, sex, gender, sexual orientation, gender identity and expressions, language, disability, HIV status, and other status, and provide penalties for these; HB 4021: Healthy Beverage Options to regulate the availability of beverages to children in schools and for other purposes; HB 19: Full Disclosure Policy to require the full disclosure of all information on fiscal management from all national government departments, bureaus, agencies, and other instrumentalities, including government-owned or controlled corporations and their subsidiaries and local governments. This act will also provide penalties for violations of said requirements; HB 3905: Participatory Budget Process to institutionalize citizens’ participation in the budget process and for other processes; and HB 3237: Freedom of Information to strengthen the right of citizens to information held by the government.

== Vice presidency (2016–2022) ==
Vice Presidential styles of Leni Robredo
- Reference style: Her Excellency
- Spoken style: Your Excellency
- Alternative style: Madame Vice President

SWS Net satisfaction ratings of Leni Robredo (September 2016–December 2021)
Date	Rating
Sep 2016	+49
Dec 2016	+37
Mar 2017	+26
Jun 2017	+36
Sep 2017	+41
Dec 2017	+42
May 2018	+34
Jun 2018	+32
Sep 2018	+34
Dec 2018	+27
Mar 2019	+42
Jun 2019	+28
Sep 2019	+33
Dec 2019	+36
Dec 2020	+23
May 2021	+24
Jun 2021	+18
Sep 2021	+24
Dec 2021	+1
Apr 2022	+8
Jun 2022	+7

On October 5, 2015, after her three daughters set aside their initial objections, Robredo announced that she would run for vice president under the Liberal Party in the 2016 election, as the running mate of presidential candidate Mar Roxas. Robredo won the election with 14,418,817 votes, or 35.11 percent of cast ballots, narrowly defeating her closest rival, Senator Bongbong Marcos, by 263,473 votes or by 0.64 percent. Marcos, filed an electoral protest on June 29, a day before inauguration. On February 16, 2021, the PET unanimously dismissed Marcos' electoral protest against Robredo.

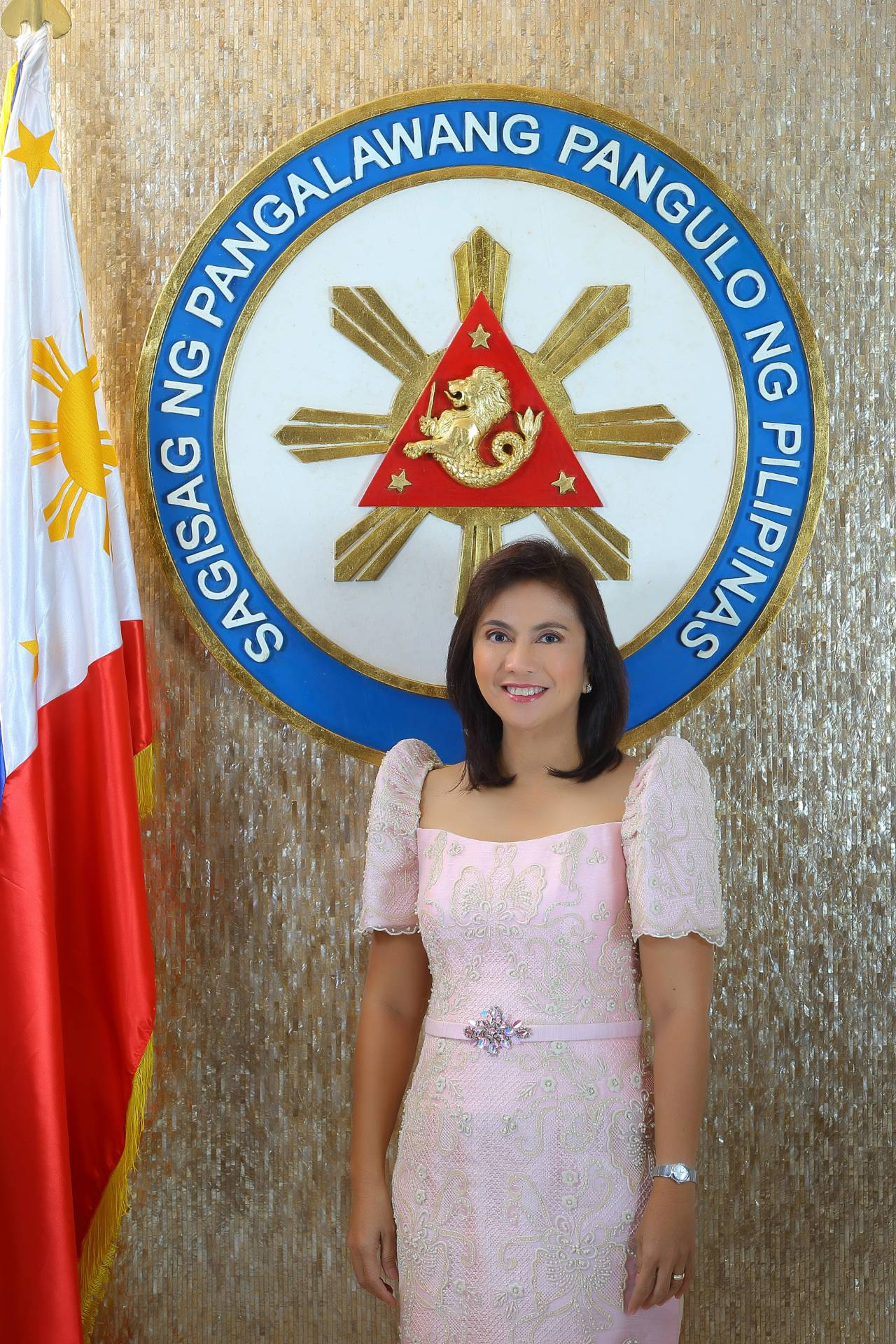
Official portrait, 2016

Robredo was sworn in as vice president of the Philippines on June 30, 2016, at the Quezon City Reception House, which she had since used as her office.

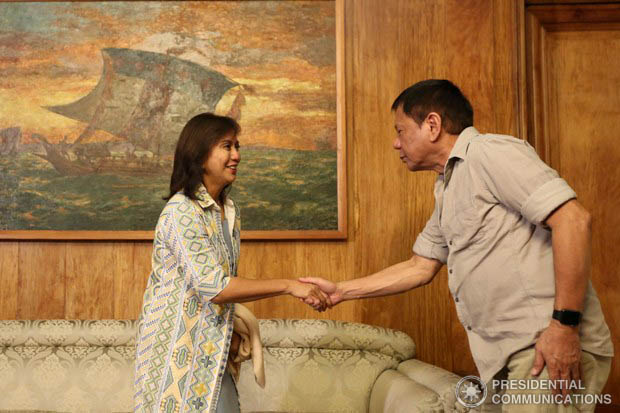
Robredo paying a courtesy call to President Rodrigo Duterte on July 4, 2016.

Robredo is sworn in by Duterte as HUDCC Secretary at the Malacañang Palace on July 12, 2016.

Robredo first met President Rodrigo Duterte personally at the Armed Forces of the Philippines change-of-command ceremonies at Camp Aguinaldo on July 1, 2016, a day after their inauguration. She later paid a courtesy call on him at Malacañang Palace on July 4, their first formal meeting. On July 7, Duterte called Robredo during a press conference to offer her the cabinet position of head of the Housing and Urban Development Coordinating Council, which Robredo accepted. Robredo is the third vice president to head the government agency focused on housing programs, following her immediate predecessors Noli de Castro and Jejomar Binay. Duterte earlier said that he did not want to appoint a cabinet position to Robredo due to his unfamiliarity with her and his friendship with Marcos.

On December 4, 2016, Robredo was informed by Cabinet Secretary Leoncio Evasco Jr. "to desist from attending all Cabinet meetings starting December 5", which prompted her to release a statement tendering her resignation as the chairwoman of the Housing and Urban Development Coordinating Council, effective the following day.

In March 2017, Robredo sent a video appeal to the United Nations in which she claimed that the Philippine National Police had unwritten policies in its operations in the drug war, where family members of drug peddlers were allegedly being held hostage and relatives of drug users and pushers wanted by the police were being killed. Robredo's message to a side meeting of the UN Commission on Narcotic Drugs annual meeting in Vienna last March 16 stirred a political firestorm as it coincided with the filing by Magdalo Rep. Gary Alejano of the first impeachment case against President Duterte. Robredo also claimed of a "palit ulo" (head swapping) scheme, where police allegedly rounded up families of accused drug personalities to demand for their relatives to be taken in exchange for the accused drug personalities if they could not be found. Citing a lack of evidence to the claims, a group of lawyers and academics filed an impeachment attempt against Robredo for allegedly "betraying her oath to defend the country." The impeachment campaign against her was rejected by Duterte himself, and never gained traction due to a lack of endorsement from the House of Representatives.

On November 4, 2019, Duterte assigned Robredo to be co-chairperson of the Inter-Agency Committee on Anti-Illegal Drugs (ICAD) until the end of his term in 2022, said presidential spokesman Salvador Panelo. After 19 days, however, Duterte fired Robredo from her post after stiff opposition from the Duterte administration following her meetings with foreign entities and request for classified drug war information during her tenure as ICAD co-chair.

The Office of the Vice President under Robredo was identified by the Commission on Audit in 2017 for delays in liquidating travel expenses. But for the next four consecutive years (2018–2022), the office received the highest audit rating from the commission.

=== Policies ===
Robredo has spearheaded programs under the Office of the Vice President (OVP). As of January 2022, her flagship anti-poverty program Angat Buhay has benefitted 622,000 families in 223 cities and municipalities across the country since she assumed office in 2016. P520 million worth of aid has been mobilized for the program, mostly from donations by the private sector. The OVP under Robredo has partnered with 372 organizations in the implementation of Angat Buhay. The Angat Buhay program focuses on six key advocacy areas, namely: public education, rural development, food security and nutrition, women empowerment, universal healthcare, and housing and resettlement.

In October 2017, the Senate increased the 2018 budget of the Office of the Vice President (OVP) by ₱20 million, which was allotted for the vice president's Angat Buhay program. In the same month, Robredo called on fellow Filipinos to remember the 165 soldiers and police who gave their lives for the liberation of Marawi City. Robredo said her office was already preparing to help in the rehabilitation of Marawi City, primarily through its flagship anti-poverty program.

=== COVID-19 pandemic response ===
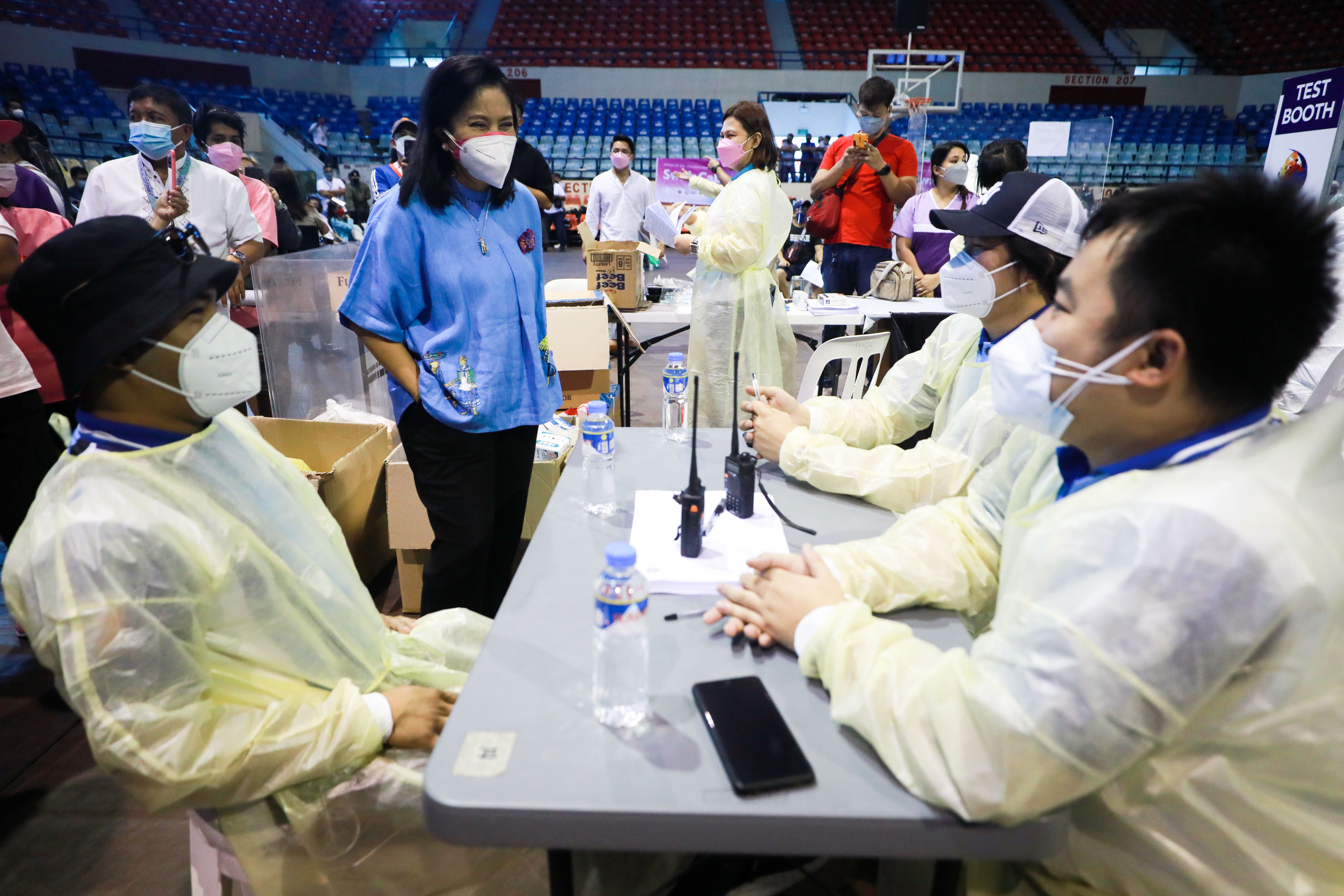
Robredo visits COVID-19 frontliners in the OVP Swab Cab in Antipolo, Rizal on January 17, 2022.

During the COVID-19 pandemic, the OVP under Robredo provided free shuttle services for pandemic frontline workers, swab tests, telehealth services, and raised funds for relief operations across the country. The office has also delivered 7,350 personal protective equipment (PPEs) to nine hospitals, including the San Lazaro Hospital, the Philippine General Hospital, and the Lung Center of the Philippines. A total of ₱17.3 million was raised for these donations, including food and care packages for the health workers and their families.

=== 2019 Philippine Senate election ===
On October 24, 2018, Robredo officially launched the opposition senatorial slate for the 2019 senatorial elections, declaring that 'the opposition is alive.' The opposition candidates ran under the "Otso Diretso" slate, which included former senator Mar Roxas, election lawyer Romulo Macalintal, Mindanao peace advocate Samira Gutoc-Tomawis, human rights lawyer Jose Manuel Diokno, former congressman Erin Tañada, former solicitor general Florin Hilbay, senator Bam Aquino, and Magdalo Party-List Rep. Gary Alejano. All Otso Diretso candidates lost the election, the second time that a Liberal Party-led coalition suffered a great loss since 1955.

=== Fake news ===
Robredo has been a constant victim of memes and "fake news" articles since taking office in 2016, some of which she claims emanate from a Senate source. Dealing with these, she said, was a "test of character". Numerous fake news stories have been manufactured on Facebook, Twitter, YouTube, and other blog sites against Robredo after she won the vice presidency in 2016, a portion of which were fabricated by pro-Duterte bloggers. Robredo has demonstrated the falsehood of these statements against her.

During the 2022 Philippine presidential election campaign period, Robredo was the "biggest victim" and target of misinformation reportedly perpetrated by social media supporters of fellow presidential candidate Bongbong Marcos.

=== 2022 presidential campaign ===
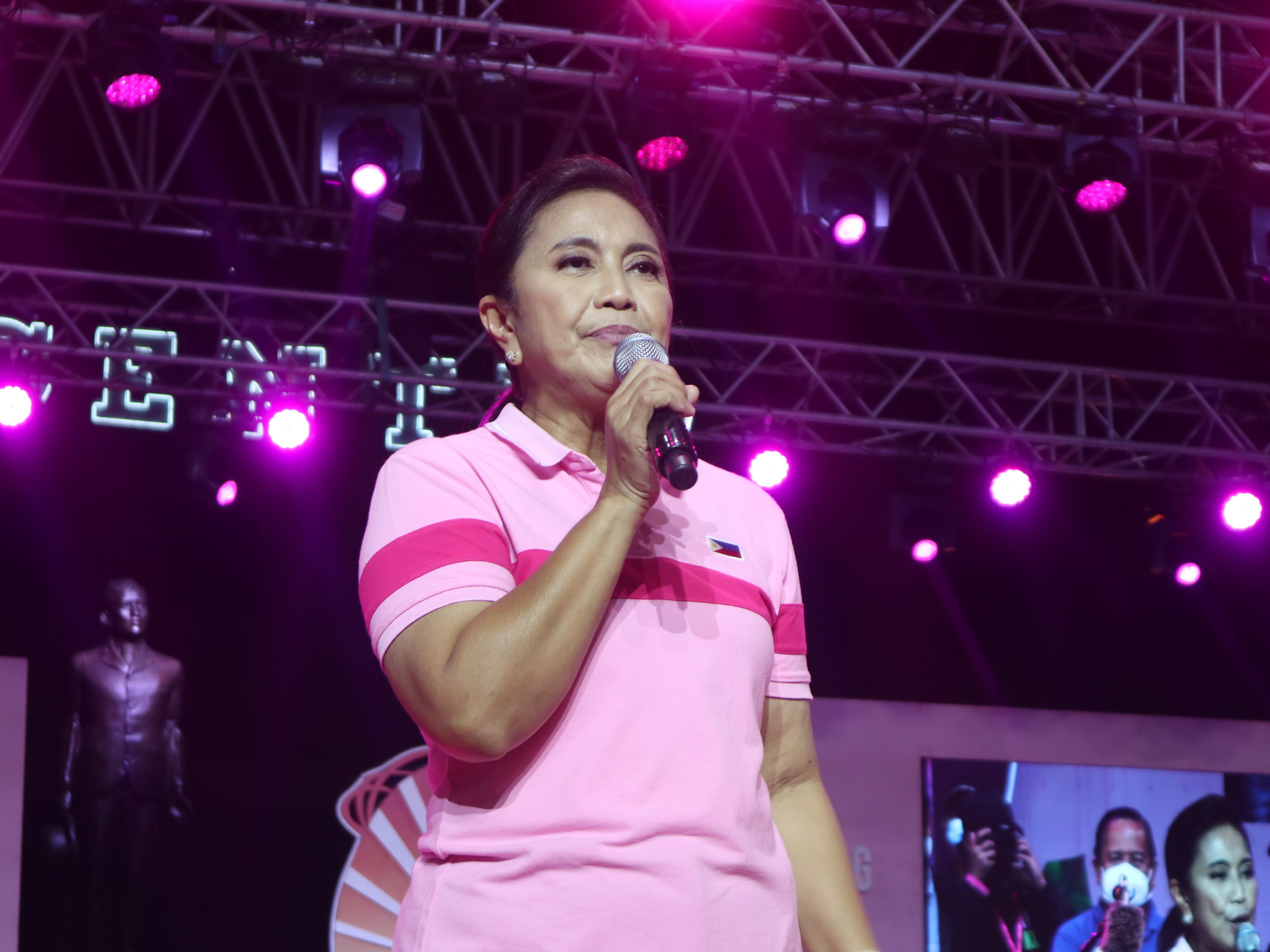
Robredo during her campaign rally in Antipolo on April 5, 2022

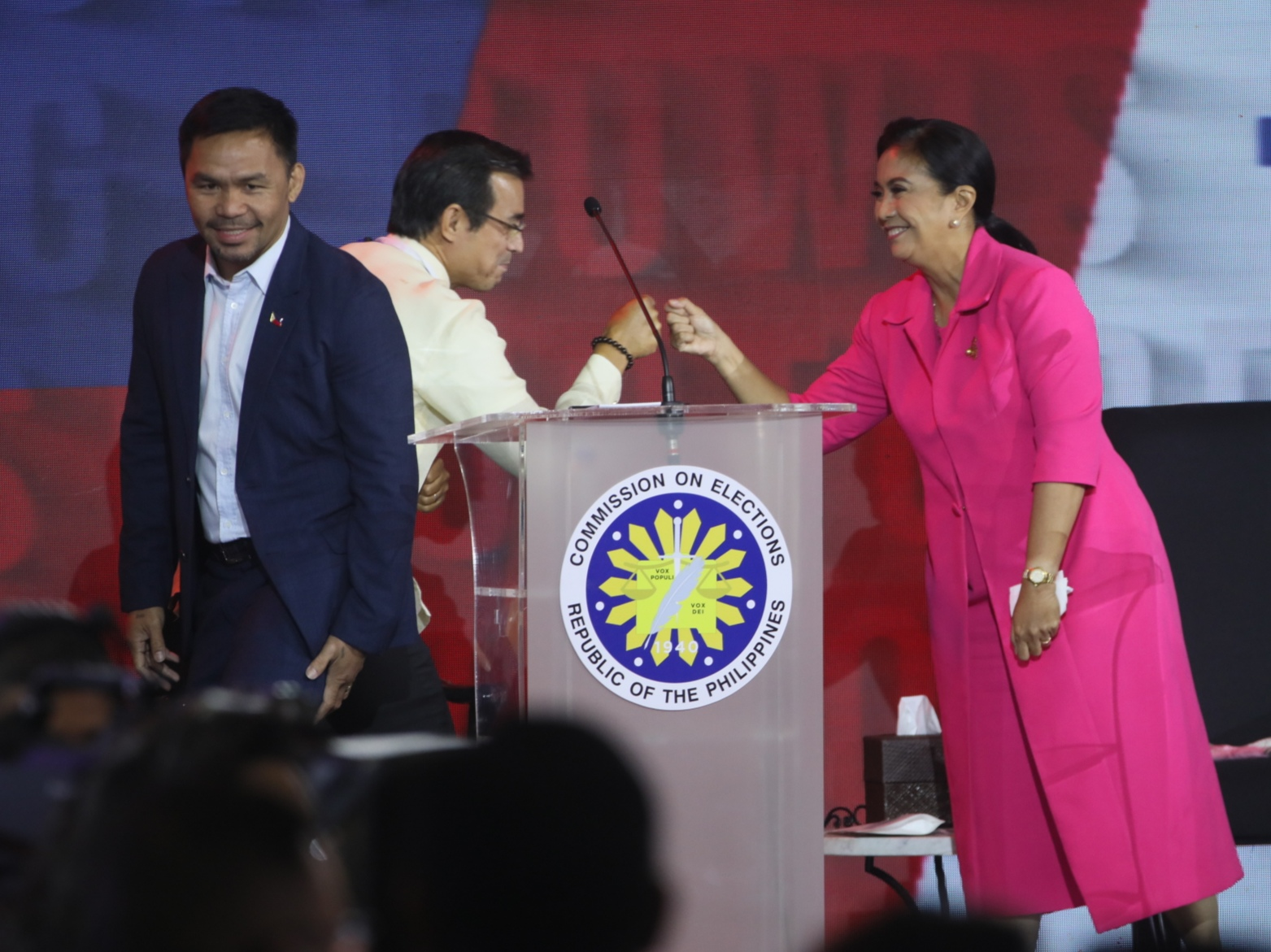
Robredo (right) with fellow presidential aspirants Isko Moreno (center) and Manny Pacquiao (left) during the closing moments of the 2nd PiliPinas Debates 2022

Robredo officially announced her campaign for president of the Philippines on October 7, 2021, the day she filed her certificate of candidacy before the Commission on Elections as an independent candidate despite her being the party leader of the Liberal Party of the Philippines. Hours after the announcement, a source from Robredo's camp revealed that she had selected senator and Liberal Party president Francis Pangilinan as her running mate. However, she lost to Bongbong Marcos, placing second in the official tally with 15,035,773 votes.

== Post–vice presidency (2022–2025) ==
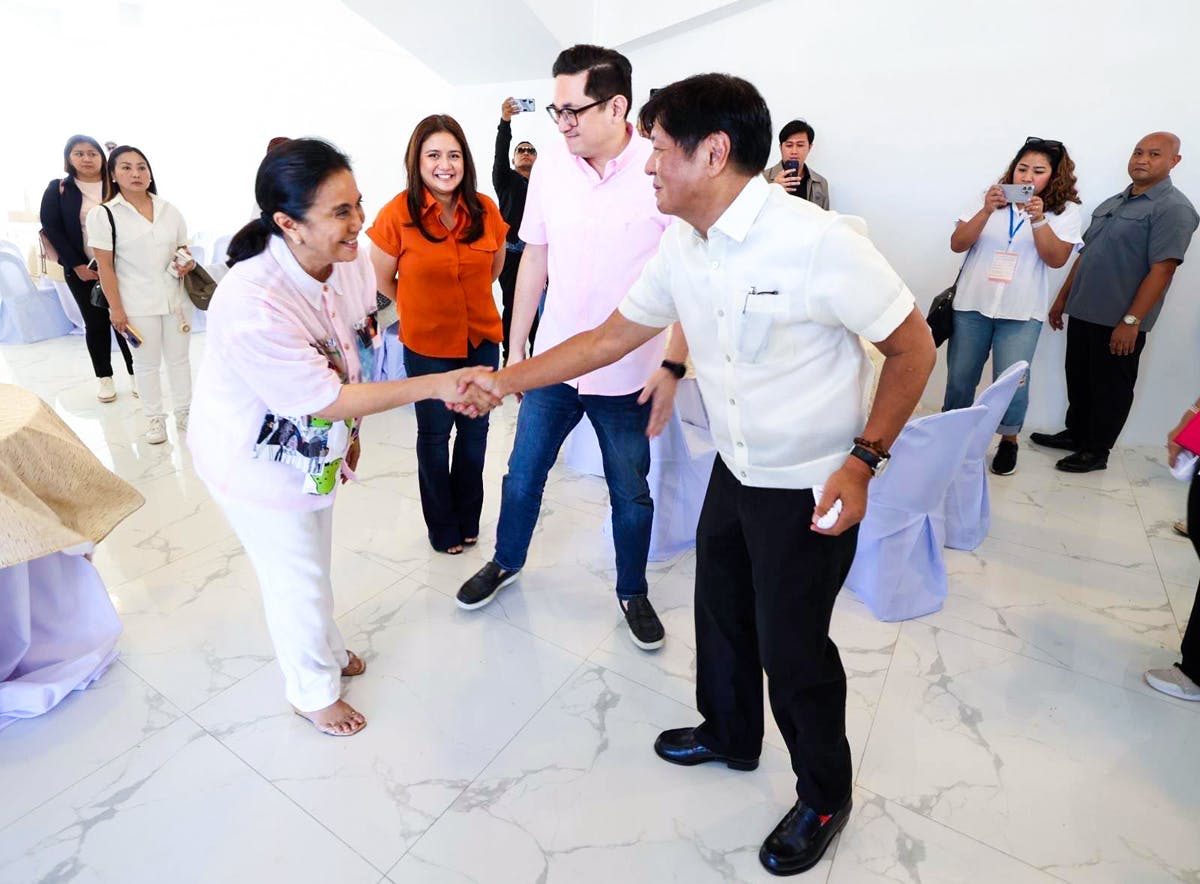
Robredo shaking hands with President Bongbong Marcos on October 17, 2024, in Sorsogon City, their first meeting since the 2022 election.

After her term ended, Robredo established a non-governmental organization called Angat Buhay, taking the name and template of the anti-poverty program that she established during her tenure as vice president.

== Mayor of Naga (2025–present) ==
=== Election ===
On June 21, 2024, Robredo expressed her intention to run for mayor in Naga in the 2025 elections—a position her husband held from 1988 to 1998 and again from 2001 to 2010. She confirmed her mayoral run on September 20. She filed her candidacy for mayor under the Liberal Party banner before the Commission on Elections (COMELEC) office in Naga. She slated Representative Gabriel Bordado as her running mate.

She went on to win the mayoral election in a landslide against three independent candidates. Bordado was also elected vice mayor, albeit with a narrower victory.

=== Tenure ===
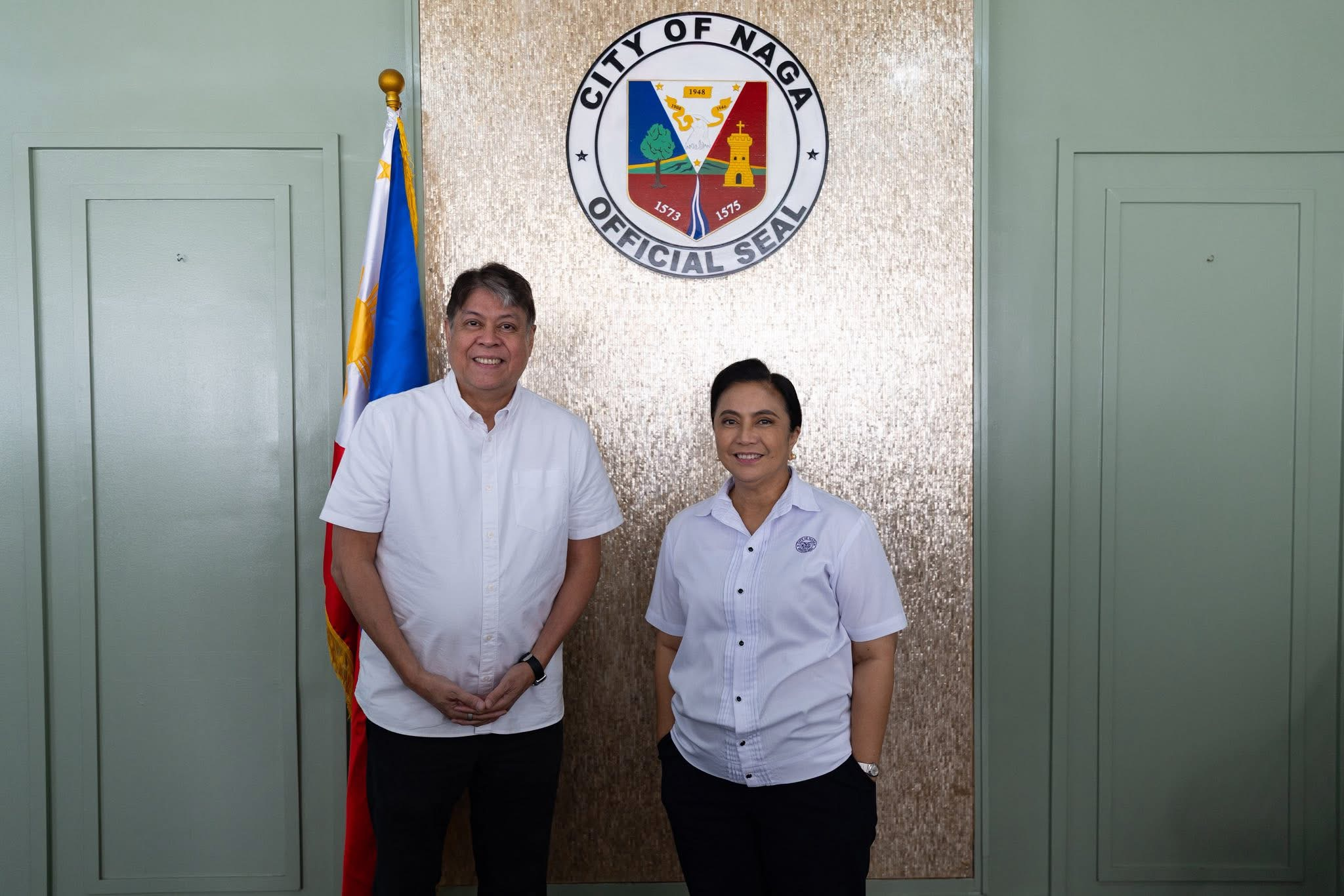
Robredo (right) and Senator Kiko Pangilinan (left) on January 22, 2026

Robredo began her term as the eighteenth mayor of Naga on June 30, 2025. She became the first woman to hold the office. In her inaugural address, she pledged to end the practice of allocating confidential funds in the city budget. On April 21, 2026, Robredo ruled out any chance that she will run for president again in the 2028 Philippine presidential election.

==== Local policies ====
===== Zero tolerance against corruption =====
On her first day as mayor of Naga City in 2025, Robredo signed Executive Order No. 001, establishing a zero-tolerance policy against corruption in local governance. The order prohibits bribery, inflated pricing, kickbacks, and gift exchanges for favors, while also banning irregularities such as falsified time records and unauthorized overtime claims. It enforces strict procurement procedures, bars appointments based on political patronage, and disallows personal use of government resources. This move reflects Robredo's continued commitment to transparency and ethical leadership, reinforcing her legacy of reform-oriented governance.

== Political positions ==
=== Domestic policies ===
==== Campaign against illegal drugs ====
Robredo has repeatedly expressed her dissent for the government's war on drugs, particularly the policy of Oplan Tokhang. After her short tenure as the co-chairperson of the government's ICAD, she made recommendations to improve the government's campaign against drugs. During her presidential campaign, she vowed to continue intensified efforts against drugs, but would focus on rehabilitation and prevention.

==== Martial law ====
During the Marawi siege, Robredo called for unity as government troops engaged in a firefight against the Maute group in Marawi, and she organized donations and directed relief operations for the victims. She then visited wounded soldiers in Iligan to give support and contributions. Robredo respects President Duterte's implementation of martial law in the whole of Mindanao as a way to combat terrorism, but has requested measures to ensure that the implementation would not resemble the "abuses and violations" during Ferdinand Marcos' implementation of Proclamation No. 1081. She also questioned the coverage and prolongation of the implementation and called on members of the Congress to review and validate the implementation as a "constitutional duty". Robredo said that the martial law in Mindanao has failed to address threats in the region. On November 26, 2019, Robredo called on the government to assure that troop deployments in Samar, Negros, and Bicol would not lead to martial law.

==== Political dynasties ====
Robredo voiced her support for the proposed anti-turncoat law in the House. During her congressional career, she co-authored the Anti-Dynasty Bill.

=== Foreign policy ===
Robredo criticized China for establishing missiles in the South China Sea. According to Robredo, any relationship with China or other countries would be based on mutual trust, respect and recognition of international laws. Therefore, she says that China must first recognize the Philippines v. China arbitral ruling before forging any agreement with the Philippines on joint exploration, a position that contrasts with that of Duterte's more diplomatic approach. Robredo called for transparency in government-sponsored deals with China.

According to former senator Antonio Trillanes, Robredo did not intend to hand over former president Rodrigo Duterte to the International Criminal Court if she won the 2022 presidential election.

== Personal life ==
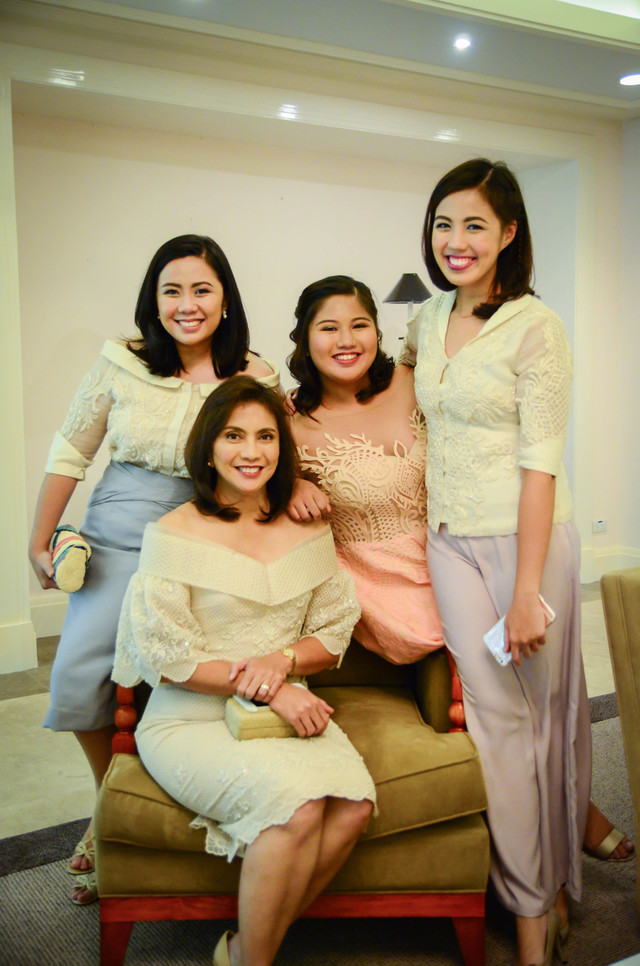
Robredo with her daughters.

Leni Robredo was married to Jesse Robredo, whom she met while working at the Bicol River Basin Development Program, from 1987 until his death from a plane crash in 2012. The couple has three daughters: Jessica Marie "Aika" Robredo, Janine Patricia "Tricia" Robredo, and Jillian Therese Robredo. Their eldest daughter, Aika, was an executive assistant at the Office of Civil Defense and holds a Master of Public Administration from the Harvard Kennedy School (which Jesse also received from the same school), while their second eldest, Tricia, is a licensed physician and was a UAAP basketball sideline reporter for National University. Their youngest, Jillian, graduated with a Bachelor of Arts degree with a double major in economics and mathematics on a scholarship at New York University.

Robredo is fluent in Filipino, English, and her native Central Bikol.

=== Broadcasting ===
From May 14, 2017, to June 26, 2022, Robredo has hosted her own public service radio program entitled BISErbisyong LENI, aired on DZXL, in her capacity as the nation's vice president. Since November 8, 2025, she hosts the public service program Oras Ni Mayor, aired on 95.1 Home Radio Naga (formerly DWIZ News FM), in her capacity as the mayor of Naga City, Camarines Sur.

== Honors and recognition ==
Throughout her career, Leni Robredo has received several honors recognizing her contributions to women's empowerment, gender equality, public service, and international relations. These include the Honorary Outstanding Woman Award of the Year 2016 from the Thai government; the Most Influential Filipina Woman of the World Award from the Filipina Women's Network in 2016; the Golden Peacock Award of Excellence from the Federation of Indian Chambers of Commerce Philippines in 2022 for her efforts in advancing India–Philippines relations; and the Outstanding Bicolano Award from the University of Nueva Caceres in Camarines Sur, her alma mater, in 2022.

She was also named among Harvard University's Hauser Leaders in Fall 2022, received the Leadership and Governance Award from Saint Theresa's College of Quezon City in March 2023, was recognized as the 2023 Most Distinguished Alumna by the University of the Philippines Alumni Association, and participated as a fellow in the Rockefeller Foundation Bellagio Center Residency Program in Bellagio, Italy, in 2024.

Pathologist Raymundo Lo named a pink orchid hybrid after Robredo. Rhyncholaeliocattleya Leni Robredo, which was only named upon Robredo's announcement of her candidacy for president in October 2021, was said to have taken seven years to bloom since its pollination from two orchid species. The flower is not yet in commercial production.

In July 2022, the Ateneo de Manila University announced the discovery of two new species of water scavenger beetles. One of them, Anacaena angatbuhay, named after Robredo's Angat Buhay program, had been discovered in Ifugao.

In addition, Robredo has been conferred honorary doctorates from the following universities:

University	Year	Degree
Polytechnic University of the Philippines	2015	Doctor in Public Administration
University of Saint Anthony	2017	Doctor of Humanities
University of the Cordilleras	2017	Doctor of Laws
Ateneo de Manila University	2022	Doctor of Philosophy in Economics
Ateneo de Naga University	2023	Doctor of Humanities

== Electoral history ==
Electoral history of Leni Robredo
Year	Office	Party	Votes received				Result
Year	Office	Party	Total	%	P.	Swing	Result
2013	Representative (Camarines Sur–3rd)	Liberal	123,843	69.93%	1st	—N/a	Won
2016	Vice President of the Philippines	Liberal	14,418,817	35.11%	1st	—N/a	Won
2022	President of the Philippines	Independent (Note: Member of Liberal Party but ran as an independent candidate.)	15,035,773	27.94%	2nd	—N/a	Lost
2025	Mayor of Naga City	Liberal	83,871	91.65%	1st	—N/a	Won

== See also ==
- List of Leni Robredo 2022 presidential campaign endorsements
- Wiktionary:kakampink

== Notes ==
House of Representatives of the Philippines
Preceded by Luis Villafuerte	Member of the Philippine House of Representatives from Camarines Sur's 3rd District; 2013–2016	Succeeded by Gabriel Bordado
Political offices
Preceded by Jejomar Binay	Vice President of the Philippines; 2016–2022	Succeeded by Sara Duterte
Preceded by Chito Cruz	Chairwoman of Housing and Urban Development Coordinating Council; 2016	Succeeded by Leoncio Evasco Jr.
New title	Co-Chairperson on the Inter-Agency Committee on Anti-Illegal Drugs; 2019; Served alongside: Aaron Aquino	Succeeded by Dante Jimenez
Party political offices
Preceded by Benigno Aquino III	Chairwoman of Liberal Party; 2016–2022	Succeeded by Francis Pangilinan
Preceded by Mar Roxas	Liberal Party nominee for Vice President of the Philippines; 2016	Succeeded by Francis Pangilinan
Order of precedence
Preceded by Jejomar Binay as Living Former Vice President	Order of Precedence of the Philippines as Living Former Vice President	Succeeded by Department of Foreign Affairs Undersecretary for Administration
